= List of Michigan State Historic Sites in Macomb County =

Location of Macomb County in Michigan

The following is a list of Michigan State Historic Sites in Macomb County, Michigan. Sites marked with a dagger (†) are also listed on the National Register of Historic Places in Macomb County, Michigan.

== Current listings ==
Name	Image	Location	City	Listing date
William Amerine House		22028 Donald Street	Eastpointe	November 15, 1990
Loren Andrus House†		57500 Van Dyke Street	Washington	April 23, 1971
John C. and Samantha Baumgartner House		18577 Masonic	Fraser	February 29, 1996
Joachim Behrns House		5297 Ten Mile Road	Warren	June 21, 1990
William Austin Burt Information Site		4300 Main Park Road	Romeo vicinity	May 21, 1985
Carnegie Library		125 Macomb Street	Mount Clemens	January 19, 1978
Clinton Grove Cemetery Complex†		21189 Cass Avenue	Clinton Township	February 29, 1996
Clinton Township Hall		39800 Moravian Dr		March 16, 1981
Crocker House		15 Union Street	Mount Clemens	February 11, 1972
Detroit Arsenal Tank Plant		Van Dyke and Martin Roads	Warren	August 16, 2001
Detroit Memorial Park Cemetery		4280 East Thirteen Mile Road	Warren	January 16, 1976
Erin United Presbyterian Church		30000 Gratiot Avenue	Roseville	March 16, 1981
Erin-Warren Fractional District No. 2 Schoolhouse†		15500 Nine Mile Road	Eastpointe	January 16, 1990
First Congregational Church†		69619 Parker	Richmond	April 4, 1975
First Methodist Episcopal Church		59024 Romeo Plank Road	Davis Village	April 21, 1980
Edsel and Eleanor Ford House†		1100 Lakeshore Drive	Grosse Pointe Shores	February 7, 1977
Fractional School District No. 4 Schoolhouse		52650 Van Dyke	Utica	April 20, 1989
General Motors Technical Center†		Bounded by 12 Mile, Mound, and Chicago Roads and Van Dyke Avenue	Warren	January 17, 2002
Grace Episcopal Church		115 S. Gratiot Avenue, NE corner of Church St	Mount Clemens	August 15, 1975
Grand Pacific House		51059 Washington Street	New Baltimore	July 23, 1987
Grand Trunk Western Railroad, Mount Clemens Station† / Thomas Edison Informational Designation		198 Grand Avenue	Mount Clemens	May 17, 1973
Governor Alex J. Groesbeck Birthplace Informational Site		Intersection of Mound and 12 Mile Road, main entrance of the GM Technical Center	Warren	February 17, 1967
Holcombe Site† (20MB30)		Intersection of Metropolitan Parkway (16 Mile Road) and Dodge Park Road	Sterling Heights	July 17, 1970
Hotel Graustark		58405 Main Street	New Haven	January 8, 1981
Kolping Park and Chapel†		47440 Sugar Bush Road	Chesterfield Township	February 29, 1996
Kramerhof Roadhouse		24800 Jefferson Avenue, between 9 Mile and 10 Mile roads	St. Clair Shores	August 3, 1979
Frederick Kuchinmeister Farmstead		53710 North Avenue	Macomb Township	August 12, 1983
Lac Sainte Claire Informational Designation		Lac Ste. Claire Park, 11 Mile Road, just east of Jefferson Avenue	St. Clair Shores	June 15, 1979
Lenox Centre Burial Ground		Kuster Road, .5 mile North of Thirty Mile Road	Richmond	August 20, 1992
Alexander Macomb Informational Designation		West edge of Courthouse Plaza, intersection of Gratiot Ave and Macomb St	Mount Clemens	February 22, 1974
Methodist Episcopal Church		57 Avenue	Mount Clemens	January 19, 1995
Moravian Mission Informational Designation		Clinton Grove Cemetery, Cass Avenue near Moravian Drive, west of Mount Clemens	Mount Clemens	January 19, 1957
Mount Clemens Mineral Bath Industry Informational Designation		15855 Nineteen Mile Road	Mount Clemens	March 28, 1979
Original Village of Warren Informational Site		Intersection of Mound and Chicago roads	Warren	August 27, 1980
Colonel Norman Perry House		16191 32 Mile Road	Armada	August 22, 1981
Pointe a Guignolet (Milk River Settlement) Commemorative Designation		West side of Jefferson Ave. at the Milk River Bridge, between Westbury and Morningside	St. Clair Shores	August 16, 2001
Ray Religious Society Church		64255 Wolcott, between 29 Mile and 30 Mile Roads	Ray Township	March 19, 1987
Ray Township District No. 1 School		64255 Wolcott Road, between 29 Mile Road and 30 Mile Road	Ray Township	February 16, 1989
Richmond District No. 3 School		31477 School Section Road	Richmond	March 19, 1992
Romeo Historic District†		Roughly bounded by the corporate lines of the village	Romeo	April 24, 1970
Sacred Heart Roman Catholic Church		18430 Utica Road	Roseville	December 5, 1986
Saint Clement Catholic Parish Commemorative Designation		25320 Van Dyke Road	Center Line	November 18, 1993
Saint John's Lutheran Church		51161 Maria Street	New Baltimore	December 21, 1978
Saint Lawrence Parish of Utica Informational Designation		44633 Utica Road	Utica	November 15, 1990
Saint Mary Church	St.Mary's-St. Clair	415 N. 6th St.	St. Clair	April 24, 1970
Saint Mary's School		96 New Street between Pine Street and South Gratiot	Mount Clemens	June 15, 1995
Saint Peter's Evangelical Lutheran Church		23000 Gratiot Ave, 2 blocks N of 9 Mile Rd	Eastepointe	February 22, 2001
Selfridge Field		Roadside M-59 near Mount Clemens	Mount Clemens vicinity	September 17, 1957
Selinsky-Green House		22504 11 Mile Road, just east of Jefferson Avenue	St. Clair Shores	July 26, 1978
Shoreline Interurban Railway Commemorative Designation		24800 Jefferson Ave between Blossom Heath Blvd & Revere St	St. Clair Shores	July 15, 1999
Simpson Park Campground		70199 Campground Road	Romeo vicinity	May 13, 1981
St. Joseph Hospital and Bath House		15855 Nineteen Mile Road	Mount Clemens	March 28, 1979
John Theisen House		12240 East Ten Mile Road	Warren	March 15, 1990
Thomas Clegg and First Auto Informational Designation		On Boardman at Cedar Street	Memphis	June 10, 1980
Trostheide Feed Store (Demolished)		28471 Gratiot	Roseville	March 22, 1983
William Tucker House		29020 Riverbank	Harrison Township	February 23, 1981
William Upton House†		40433 Utica Road	Sterling Heights	October 27, 1983
Utica Cemetery		46325 Shelby Road	Shelby Township	December 3, 1998
Village of Romeo Informational Designation		Corner of Main and Church streets	Romeo	June 10, 1987
Warren Township District No. 4 School†		27600 Bunert Road	Warren	April 20, 1989
Warren Union Cemetery		Chicago Road east of Ryan Road	Warren	August 23, 1990
Harold and Mabelle Weller House		36035 Washington	Richmond	January 21, 1999
Zion Evangelical Church		68 New Street	Mount Clemens	July 23, 1985

== See also ==
- National Register of Historic Places listings in Macomb County, Michigan
- List of Michigan State Historical Markers in Macomb County

== Sources ==
- Historic Sites Online – Macomb County. Michigan State Housing Developmental Authority. Accessed May 17, 2011.
