= Romeo High School =

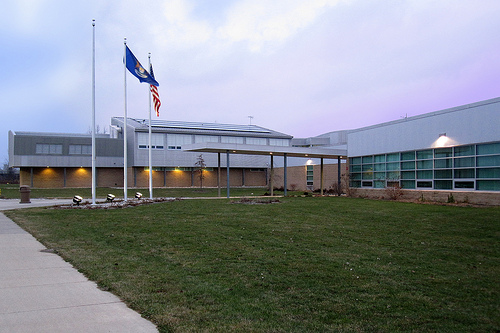

Location
- 62300 Jewell Road; Washington, Michigan; United States; 42°45′15.30″N 83°00′44.50″W

Information
- Type: Public high school
- Established: 1867
- School district: Romeo Community Schools
- CEEB code: 233220
- Principal: Bernie Osebold
- Teaching staff: 108.03 (on an FTE basis)
- Grades: 9-12
- Enrollment: 1,791 (2023-2024)
- Student to teacher ratio: 16.58
- Campus: Large suburban
- Colors: Red and white
- Nickname: Bulldogs
- Rival: Eisenhower High School, Dakota High School, Anchor Bay, Chippewa Valley
- Yearbook: The Juliet
- Feeder schools: Romeo Middle School
- Website: romeok12.org/schools/romeo-high-school/

Romeo High School is located in northern Macomb County, Michigan, United States, approximately 29 miles north of the city of Detroit. It is a part of Romeo Community Schools.

== Facilities ==
On the site of the present high school, The Romeo Engineering and Technology Center was built and completed in 2003. The original plan was to create a new separate school, but funding failed, so the decision was made to build a satellite school to reduce overcrowding at the main high school. The RETC has an area of 90,288 sq.ft., covers 77 acres, and cost $12,259,836 to build. Solar panels were installed there and turned on in December 2010. The solar panels were paid for by grants and can produce upwards of 19.8 kilowatts (DC).

In fall of 2019, the present high school building opened. It was connected to the Engineering and Technology Center. The architect was Integrated Design Solutions.

== Academics ==
Romeo High School uses a career pathways structure called The Academies at Romeo High School. After attending the Ninth Grade Academy, which is on the site of the high school but in a separate building, students choose one of twelve career pathways.

Academies and Programs
Academy	Program
The Academy of Business, Entrepreneurship, and Innovation	Business (Finance or Marketing)
The Academy of Business, Entrepreneurship, and Innovation	Hospitality & Culinary Arts
The Academy of Business, Entrepreneurship, and Innovation	Information Technology
The Academy of Design, Engineering, and Manufacturing	Architecture
The Academy of Design, Engineering, and Manufacturing	Construction
The Academy of Design, Engineering, and Manufacturing	Engineering (Mechanical or Mechatronics)
The Academy of Design, Engineering, and Manufacturing	Advanced Manufacturing
The Academy of Design, Engineering, and Manufacturing	Media Production
The Academy of Design, Engineering, and Manufacturing	Robotics
The Academy of Health, Human, and Public Service	Health Services (EMT or CMA)
The Academy of Health, Human, and Public Service	Education
The Academy of Health, Human, and Public Service	Law & Public Safety

== Athletics ==
The Romeo Bulldogs compete in the Macomb Area Conference. The school colors are red and white. The following Michigan High School Athletic Association (MHSAA) sports are offered:

- Baseball (boys)
- Basketball (girls and boys)
- Bowling (girls and boys)
- Competitive cheer (girls)
- Cross country (girls and boys)
  - State championship boys - 2020
  - State championship girls - 2023
- Football (boys)
  - State championship - 2015
- Golf (girls and boys)
- Ice hockey (boys)
  - State championship - 2016
- Lacrosse (boys)
- Soccer (girls and boys)
- Softball (girls)
- Swim and dive (girls and boys)
- Track and field (girls and boys)
- Volleyball (girls)
  - State championship - 2014
- Wrestling (boys)

== Notable alumni ==
- Nick Blankenburg, ice hockey player
- Michael Heldman, NFL defensive lineman for the Kansas City Chiefs
- John Lomakoski, former NFL player
- John Stoughton Newberry, U.S. congressman
- Kid Rock, rock musician
