= National Register of Historic Places listings in Macomb County, Michigan =

Map highlighting Macomb County

The following is a list of Registered Historic Places in Macomb County, Michigan.
This National Park Service list is complete through NPS recent listings posted September 26, 2025.

	Name on the Register	Image	Date listed	Location	City or town	Description
1	Clinton Grove Cemetery	Clinton Grove Cemetery	July 25, 1996 (#96000807)	21189 Cass Avenue, Clinton Township; 42°36′10″N 82°54′13″W	Mount Clemens	The Clinton Grove Cemetery Association was established on March 30, 1855 as a non-sectarian, non-profit association; its original five-acre plot has since been increased to 50 acres. In 1914 a Tudor office and chapel building were added, both designed by Mount Clemens architect Theophilus Van Damme. Family mausoleums and crypts are scattered among the in-ground burials, as well as a wide variety of 19th and early 20th century monuments. The cemetery is an outstanding example of an urban, park-like memorial burial ground, retaining the feel of a Victorian-era rural cemetery through both landscaping and the variety and quality of its gravemarkers.
2	Clinton-Kalamazoo Canal	Clinton-Kalamazoo Canal	March 24, 1972 (#72000638)	Runs between Utica and Yates; 42°39′17″N 83°03′10″W	Yates	The Clinton–Kalamazoo Canal was begun in 1838, with the plan oc connecting Mount Clemens to the mouth of the Kalamazoo River. However, funding quickly dried up, and all construction stopped in 1843 after only 13 miles had been completed. The remains of the canal extend into both Macomb County and Oakland County.
3	Erin-Warren Fractional District No. 2 Schoolhouse	Erin-Warren Fractional District No. 2 Schoolhouse	April 30, 2001 (#01000412)	15500 Nine Mile Road; 42°27′53″N 82°57′52″W	Eastpointe	Also known as the Halfway Schoolhouse, this school was built in 1872 in the village of Halfway (now Eastpointe). The schoolhouse, when it was sold and moved to the corner of Nine Mile Road and Gratiot Avenue, where it was used as a warehouse. In 1984, the East Detroit Historical Society purchased the building, and moved it once more to within 60 feet of its original site. Although twice moved, the school remains essentially unaltered.
4	First Congregational Church	First Congregational Church	December 6, 1975 (#75000954)	69619 Parker Street; 42°48′49″N 82°45′37″W	Richmond	In 1887, the First Congregational Church congregation hired local builder Charles W. McCauley to build this church. It was used for worship until 1973, when the congregation merged with a nearby church and sold the building to the Richmond Community Theatre, which still uses the structure. It remains a significant and well-reserved example of 19th century Gothic Revival architecture.
5	Edsel and Eleanor Ford House	Edsel and Eleanor Ford House	July 24, 1979 (#79001164)	1100 Lakeshore Drive; 42°27′21″N 82°52′26″W	Grosse Pointe Shores	In 1926, Edsel Ford (the son of Henry Ford and a Ford Motor Company executive) and his wife Eleanor hired Albert Kahn to design a house on the shore of Lake St. Clair in a style resembling that of cottages they had seen in England in the Cotswolds. The site plan and gardens of the estate were designed by Jens Jensen. Construction of the house took a year, but the interior took another two to complete, and the Fords moved in in 1929. The house was designated a National Historic Landmark in 2016.
6	General Motors Technical Center	General Motors Technical Center	March 27, 2000 (#00000224)	Bounded by 12 Mile, Mound and Chicago Roads, and Van Dyke Avenue; 42°30′48″N 83°02′16″W	Warren	The GM Tech Center was designed by architect Eero Saarinen. Construction began in 1949 and continued until 1955, with a total cost of approximately US$100,000,000. The campus was ceremonially opened by Dwight D. Eisenhower on May 16, 1956, and in 1986 the complex was designated by the American Institute of Architects as the most outstanding architectural project of its era.
7	Grand Trunk Western Railroad, Mount Clemens Station	Grand Trunk Western Railroad, Mount Clemens Station	October 26, 1981 (#81000311)	198 Grand Street; 42°35′57″N 82°53′30″W	Mount Clemens	This passenger station was built by the Grand Trunk Western Railroad in 1859 and served the community until 1953. The site played a significant role in Thomas Edison's life: in August 1862, a young Edison pulled a three-year-old boy from the path of an oncoming train. As a reward, the boy's father, station agent J. U. Mackenzie, taught Edison train telegraphy and operation, spurring his interest in technology. The depot now houses the Michigan Transit Museum.
8	Holcombe Site	Holcombe Site	April 16, 1971 (#71001023)	Address Restricted. 42°34′07″N 83°00′34″W	Warren	The Holcombe Site is a Paleo-Indian archaeological site situated on what was, at the time it was occupied, the strandline of a small glacial lake that probably drained into nearby Lake Algonquin. Archaeologists found arrowheads, flint chips, and bone fragments at the site, indicating that these Paleo-Indians hunted Barren-ground Caribou. The site yielded evidence of the Indian's change in culture and subsistence as the climate in the area changed.
9	Kolping Park and Chapel	Kolping Park and Chapel	December 12, 1996 (#96001417)	47440 Sugar Bush Road; 42°39′00″N 82°49′16″W	Chesterfield Township, Michigan	Kolping Park is a 19-acre parcel containing a historic wayside chapel, as well as a shrine to Blessed Father Adolph Kolping, and a pavilion, dance hall, rifle range, picnic shelter, parade grounds, playground, soccer field and parking lot on landscaped grounds. The chapel, intended to be reminiscent of European wayside chapels, is a Gothic Revival structure, designed and constructed by Rev. Father Joseph Wuest, founder of the local chapter of the Kolping Society. It is constructed from stones and shells sent to Wuest by Kolping societies from all over the world. In 2016, the Chapel was moved from its original location to the nearby Chesterfield Historical Village.
10	Mount Clemens Public Library	Mount Clemens Public Library	December 1, 2021 (#100007210)	125 Macomb Pl. 42°35′58″N 82°52′49″W	Mount Clemens	
11	Packard Proving Grounds Gateway Complex	Packard Proving Grounds Gateway Complex	February 1, 2007 (#06001322)	49965 Van Dyke Avenue; 42°39′45″N 83°02′01″W	Shelby Township	In 1927, the Packard Motor Car Company acquired a 560-acre (2.3 km^{2}) site north of their factory, intending to build an automotive testing facility. The company hired Albert Kahn to design the buildings of the facility, which was opened in 1928. Packard operated the facility until their 1957 collapse, after which Ford Motor Company bought it in 1961. In the late 1990s, Ford turned over 7 acres (28,000 m^{2}) of land, containing the most historically important portions of the complex, to the Packard Motor Car Foundation for restoration and care.
12	Romeo Historic District	Romeo Historic District	July 8, 1970 (#70000281)	Roughly bounded by the corporate lines of the city 42°48′07″N 83°00′51″W	Romeo	The Romeo Historic District contains approximately 100 well-preserved historic structures, constructed in a variety of architectural styles. Most are frame structures, including a number of Gothic Revival cottages, but the district also includes substantial brick buildings located along Romeo's main street.
13	William Upton House	William Upton House	July 31, 1986 (#86002113)	40433 Utica Road; 42°35′29″N 83°00′42″W	Sterling Heights	William Upton was a successful farmer who built this house in 1866-67. He lived in the house until 1891, after which a succession of other farmers, and then tenants, lived in the house. In 1964, the house was purchased by the Macomb Child Guidance Center, and later the city of Sterling Heights bought the building and in 1981-82, atrestored the exterior and converted the interior into public offices.
14	Warren Township District No. 4 School	Warren Township District No. 4 School	May 29, 2012 (#12000308)	27900 Bunert Road; 42°29′57″N 82°58′33″W	Warren	The Warren Township District No. 4 School, also known as the Bunert School, was constructed in 1875 on land purchased by the school district from August and Mine Bunert. The structure was used as a school until 1944, and is currently a historical museum operated by the Warren Historical Society. It is the last one-room schoolhouse remaining in Warren.
15	Washington Octagon House	Washington Octagon House	September 3, 1971 (#71000413)	57000 Van Dyke Street; 42°43′06″N 83°02′06″W	Washington	The Loren Andrus Octagon House, also known as the Washington Octagon House, was built in 1860 by David Stewart for his brother-in-law, Loren Andrus.
16	Wolcott Mill	Wolcott Mill	December 8, 2009 (#09001063)	63841 Wolcott Road; 42°45′58″N 82°55′36″W	Ray Township	The Wolcott Mill was constructed in 1847, and operated as a grist and feed mill. Fred B. Wolcott purchased it in 1878, updated the machinery, and operated it for years afterward. Thi mill finally closed in 1967, and in 1989 was opened as part of the Wolcott Mill Metropark.

== See also ==
- List of Michigan State Historic Sites in Macomb County, Michigan
- List of National Historic Landmarks in Michigan
- National Register of Historic Places listings in Michigan
- Listings in neighboring counties: Lapeer, Oakland, St. Clair, Wayne
