= John Lomakoski =

American football player (1940–1999)

John Lamokoski
- Lomakoski, c. 1961

No. 64, 73
- Position: Offensive tackle

Personal information
- Born: November 11, 1940; Washington, Michigan, U.S.
- Died: February 16, 1999 (aged 58); Munising, Michigan, U.S.
- Listed height: 6 ft 4 in (1.93 m)
- Listed weight: 250 lb (113 kg)

Career information
- High school: Romeo (MI)
- College: Western Michigan
- NFL draft: 1962: 4th round, 48th overall pick
- AFL draft: 1962: 8th round, 61st overall pick

Career history

Playing
- Detroit Lions (1962); Richmond Rebels (1966)

Coaching
- Richmond Rebels (1966) Assistant coach

Career NFL statistics
- Games played: 3
- Stats at Pro Football Reference

John A. Lomakoski (November 11, 1940 – February 16, 1999) was an American professional football player.

== Early life ==
Lomakoski was born in 1940 in Washington, Michigan, and attended Romeo High School in northern Macomb County, Michigan. He played college football for the Western Michigan Broncos from 1958 to 1961. He was twice selected as an all-conference player and was invited to play in the Senior Bowl after his senior year.

== Professional career ==
He was selected by the Detroit Lions in the fourth round (48th overall pick) of the 1962 NFL draft. He signed a contract to play for the Lions in December 1961. He appeared in three games at the offensive tackle position for the team during its 1962 season. In June 1963, he signed a contract to return to the Lions, but he was released in August 1963.

== Personal life and death ==
After his football career ended, Lomakoski worked as a sales representative for Procter & Gamble. He retired in Munising, Michigan, where he died in 1999 at age 58. He was survived by his wife Karen, daughter Sarah Elizabeth, and son John David.
