= Romeo Community Schools =

School district in Romeo, Michigan, U.S.

Address
- 316 North Main Street Romeo, Macomb County, Michigan, 48065; United States

District information
- Grades: Pre-Kindergarten-12
- Superintendent: Todd R. Robinson
- Schools: 7
- Budget: $97,932,000 2022-2023 expenditures
- NCES District ID: 2630090

Students and staff
- Students: 5,355 (2024-2025)
- Teachers: 327.8 (on an FTE basis) (2024-2025)
- Staff: 665.05 FTE (2024-2025)
- Student–teacher ratio: 16.34 (2024-2025)
- District mascot: Bulldogs

Other information
- Website: romeok12.org

Romeo Community Schools is a public school district primarily Macomb County, Michigan. It serves Romeo and parts of the townships of Armada, Bruce, Ray, Shelby, and Washington. It also serves parts of Addison and Oakland townships in Oakland County.

== History ==
The first school in Romeo was a log building built in 1828. Romeo was substantial enough that in 1833, the Michigan Territorial Council, precursor to the Michigan Legislature, established Romeo Academy. It became a branch of the University of Michigan in 1843, but later closed due to being unfunded. While not directly related to the present-day school district, it represents education in Romeo during the pioneer era.

The first dedicated public high school was built in 1885, though a secondary school known as the Dickinson Institute had existed earlier. The 1885 school served the district until being torn down in 1966, after being expanded with a large addition in 1927, which remained.

A new high school opened in fall 1958, designed by Eberle M. Smith and Associates, and the 1885/1927 building became the district's middle school. When the current high school opened, the 1958 high school became the current middle school. The old middle school was torn down in 2021.

In 2000, voters passed a bond issue to build the Romeo Engineering and Technology Center to alleviate overcrowding at the high school. It was dedicated to career and technology education, although it didn't have facilities of a regular school such as a cafeteria because it was to be used for only part of the day. It opened in fall 2003. The current high school opened in fall 2019 as an addition to that building, which was renovated. Powers Middle School became the district's ninth grade building at that time.

== Schools ==
Schools in Romeo Community Schools district
School	Address	Notes
Romeo High School	62300 Jewell Road, Washington Township	Grades 10–12.
Romeo Ninth Grade Academy	62100 Jewell Road, Washington Township	Grade 9
Romeo Middle School	11091 W. 32 Mile Road, Romeo	Grades 6-8
Amanda Moore Elementary	209 Dickenson St., Romeo	Grades K-5
Hamilton-Parsons Elementary	69875 Dequindre, Leonard	Grades K-5
Hevel Elementary	12700 E. 29 Mile Rd., Washington Township	Grades K-5
Indian Hills Elementary	8401 W. 29 Mile Rd., Washington Township	Grades K-5
Washington Elementary	58230 Van Dyke, Washington Township	Grades K-5
Croswell Early Childhood Center	175 Croswell St., Romeo	Preschool
Romeo Virtual Academy		Online learning option for grades 6-12.
