= Armada Area Schools =

School district in Michigan

Address
- 74500 Burk Street Armada, Macomb County, Michigan, 48005; United States
- Coordinates: 42.8465°N 82.8822°W

District information
- Grades: PreKindergarten–12
- Superintendent: Michael G. Musary
- Schools: 4
- Budget: $28,579,000 2022–2023 expenditures
- NCES District ID: 2603240

Students and staff
- Students: 1,716 (2024–2025)
- Teachers: 102.79 (on an FTE basis) (2024–2025)
- Staff: 277.95 FTE (2024–2025)
- Student–teacher ratio: 16.69 (2024–2025)
- District mascot: Tigers

Other information
- Website: www.armadaschools.org

Armada Area Schools is a public school district in Macomb County, Michigan. It serves Armada and parts of the townships of Armada, Bruce, Lenox, Ray, and Richmond. It also serves parts of Berlin and Riley townships in St. Clair County.

== History ==
In fall 1929, a new Armada High School opened. Eighteen small, independent school districts consolidated in the 1940s to form Armada Area Schools.

A new high school opened in October 1956. Walter H. Wyeth of Port Huron was the architect.

The current Armada High School opened in fall 1976, and the former high school was renovated and became the district's middle school.

Armada Elementary, later known as Orville C. Krause Elementary, opened in fall 1999. The school had separate sections for early elementary (grades kindergarten through second) and upper grades (third through fifth).

== Schools ==
Schools in Armada Area Schools district
School	Address	Notes
Armada High School	23655 Armada Center Road, Armada	Grades 9–12
Armada Middle School	23550 Armada Center Road, Armada	Grades 6-8
Orville C. Krause Elementary	23900 Armada Center Road, Armada	Grades PreK-5
Armada Continuing Education	23211 Prospect Street, Armada	Alternative online school

Advanced high school classes in science, engineering, and math are held at the district's Armada Science Academy at 23211 Prospect Street in Armada.
