= Frederick, Michigan =

Coordinates: 42°35′41.3″N 82°54′48.3″W

Frederick, Michigan, also known as Casino, was a community in Clinton Charter Township of Macomb County, Michigan in the U.S. state of Michigan. It was located on an oxbow of the Clinton River southwest of present-day Mt. Clemens.

== History ==
Frederick was situated at the location of the New Gnadenhuetten Moravian mission, which is now just west of Mt. Clemens. Following the Gnadenhütten massacre in March 1782, the Rev. David Zeisberger and his group were summoned to Detroit by the British Major De Peyster, who suspected the Moravians of favoring the Americans in the American Revolutionary War. Zeisberger and his group, after assuaging De Peyster's suspicions were granted a place by the local Ojibwe to establish a mission a few miles north of Detroit on what was then known as the Huron River. The group arrived at the site in July 1782. The mission prospered for a short while, receiving the benefit of liberal supplies from De Peyster and his successor Lord George Hay. In 1785-1786, some of the Indian brethren of the mission laid out a road into Detroit from the mission, the first interior road in Michigan. The road followed the course approximated by Moravian Drive to Schoenherr Rd to Gratiot Ave. The mission was abandoned in 1786 after being warned by the Ojibwe to leave. Only Richard Conner (1719- 1808) and his family remained behind. His son Henry Conner, fought with Harrison in the Battle of the Thames and was present at the death of Tecumseh. Richard Conner's only daughter, Susanna, was born at the mission December 16, 1783, the first child of white parents born within the limits of the present Macomb County. She married Judge Elisha Harrington, whose farm covered the site of the old mission.

In about 1836, the Shelby road was opened to Frederick. Associate Judges Stevens, Harrington, and Conner lived in Frederick and sat with Judge Clemens

Prior to the War of 1812 a sawmill was likely built in the town, another sawmill was constructed around 1826 by Job C. Smith. The town proper got its start when Horace Stephens, Detroit resident, purchased land in Frederick and laid out a village which he named in honor of his brother. In 1836, the same year Stephens laid out the town, the eastern terminus of the Clinton-Kalamazoo Canal was Frederick, and the portion from Frederick to Utica was the only segment completed to have regular boat traffic. By 1843 the town was the Clinton River's busiest port. The village prospered until 1852 when the sawmills burned to the ground rendering Frederick a ghost town.

(Also note: The name Stephens and Stevens as mentioned in this article are more properly spelled Steevens. This from Jon Fredric Steevens, current resident of Macomb County, Great-Great Grandson and namesake of the Fredric Steevens for whom this town was named.)

== Location ==
The town was southwest of Mount Clemens; on Moravian Drive across the river from Canal Park.
