= Loren Andrus Octagon House =

Historic house in Michigan, United States

- Washington Octagon House
- U.S. National Register of Historic Places
- Michigan State Historic Site
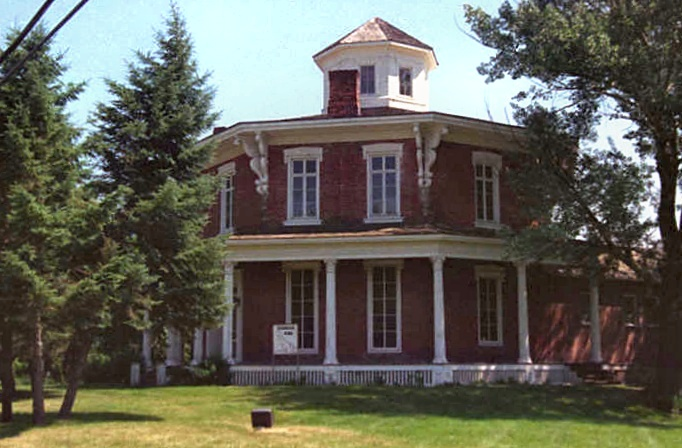

- Location within Michigan Location within the United States
- Interactive map showing the location of Washington Octagon House
- Location: Washington, Michigan
- Coordinates: 42°43′6″N 83°2′6″W
- Built: 1860
- Architect: David Stewart
- Architectural style: Octagon Mode
- NRHP reference No.: 71000413
- Added to NRHP: September 3, 1971

The Loren Andrus Octagon House, also known as the Washington Octagon House, is a historic octagon house located at 57500 Van Dyke Avenue just north of 26 Mile Road in Washington Township, Macomb County, Michigan. On September 3, 1971, it was added to the National Register of Historic Places.

== History ==
Loren Andrus was born in 1816 in New York, and moved with his parents to Washington Township in 1828. In 1837, when he was 21, Loren Andrus was taken on as an assistant engineer for the survey of the Clinton-Kalamazoo Canal. Andrus married Lucina Davis, and in 1849 the couple set up a farm on a large tract of land where this house now stands. In the late 1850s, the more prominent local residents spurred a small building boom, with each person striving to put up the most impressive residence. Andrus caught the bug, and in 1858 offered his brother-in-law, local architect and carpenter David Stewart, a steep sum to quickly design and build a distinctive house. Using Orson Squire Fowler's A Home For All as a guide, they began constructing this house, finishing in 1860.

Andrus was quite active in local cultural organizations, and the house served as a social center for the community. It was also used as a "station" on the Underground railway. In 1890, Lucinda Davis Andrus died. Loren Andrus sold the house in 1894 and moved to Detroit.

After Andrus's death, the house changed hands several times, and was even used as a restaurant in the late 1930s. In 1945, the Detroit Board of Education established Albert H. Schmidt Foundation Farm on the property to train high school and college students in agricultural techniques. The house served as a dormitory, and was operated by Wayne State University as an extension of their agricultural college. The house was scheduled to be torn down until William and Phyllis Hamilton bought the house and restored it. They turned it into a living museum with three generations of the Hamilton family living and working there. The house was later sold back into private hands and converted back into a single family residence.

It is now owned by the Friends of the Loren Andrus Octagon House, Inc., which bought it in 1987. In the 1990s and early 2000s most of the land the Octagon house once sat on was sold and converted into single-family residential homes and a shopping center. A move under the township’s controversial zoning and rationalization plan (1993).

== Description ==
The Loren Andrus Octagon House is a two-story, eight-sided structure constructed of brick. The roof has extravagant Italianate supporting brackets and an octagonal cupola with weatherboard sheathing on top. A large porch supported by Neo-Corinthian wood columns wraps around seven of the eight sides of the house. On the eighth side, a single-story brick kitchen wing with low gable roof extends to the rear. The house has two-sash double-hung windows with shaped wood lintels.

On the interior, the octagon houses four rooms on each level. In the center of the house is a dramatic spiral staircase, which extends upward from the main floor all the way to the cupola. Triangular alcoves lead off the stair to each of the rooms. Ceilings throughout the house are twelve feet high.

== See also ==
- National Register of Historic Places listings in Macomb County, Michigan
