= Mount Clemens station =

- Grand Trunk Western Railroad, Mount Clemens Station
- U.S. National Register of Historic Places
- Michigan State Historic Site
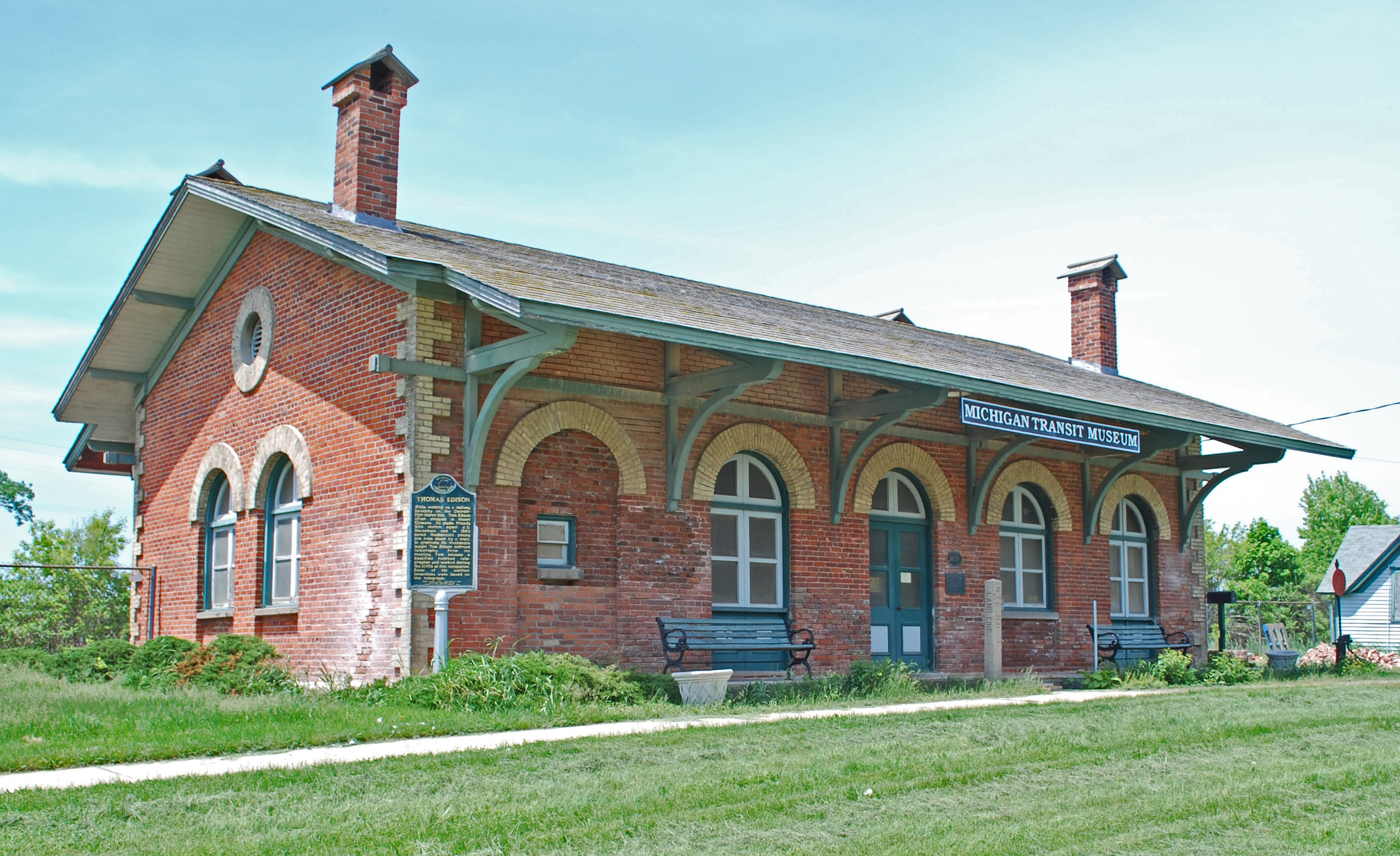

- Location within Michigan Location within the United States
- Interactive map
- Location: 198 Grand St., Mt. Clemens, Michigan
- Coordinates: 42°35′57″N 82°53′30″W
- Built: 1859
- Architectural style: Italianate
- NRHP reference No.: 81000311

Significant dates
- Added to NRHP: October 26, 1981
- Designated MSHS: May 17, 1973

Mount Clemens station is a historic railroad depot located at 198 Grand Street in Mt. Clemens, Michigan. Thomas Edison learned telegraphy at this station in his youth. The building was listed on the National Register of Historic Places in 1981 as the Grand Trunk Western Railroad, Mount Clemens Station and designated a Michigan State Historic Site in 1973. It is now operated as the Michigan Transit Museum.

== History ==
Mount Clemens was first settled in 1781, and in 1818 became the county seat of Macomb County. In the fall of 1859, Grand Trunk Western Railroad opened their Port Huron to Detroit line, travelling through Mount Clemens. They opened passenger stations along the line, including one in Port Huron and this one in Mount Clemens. The Mount Clemens station was identical to other stations built in New Haven, Fraser, and Richmond around the same time; the four are very similar to stations constructed earlier by Grand Trunk in Ontario which were likely based on an 1841 English design.

Soon after opening, the railroad hired twelve-year-old Thomas Edison, whose family had moved to Port Huron five years earlier, as a newsboy and candy salesman on the Port Huron - Detroit run. In August 1862, while the train was laying over at the Mount Clemens station, Edison pulled a three-year-old boy from the path of an oncoming train. As a reward, the boy's father, station agent J. U. Mackenzie, taught the young Edison train telegraphy and operation, spurring his interest in technology. In later years, Mackenzie joined Edison at his Menlo Park laboratory as a research associate.

Additional structures were constructed at the site over time, including a station master's house, water tower, water closet, and a second depot for freight located farther to the north. The separate buildings were all eventually demolished, save for the still-standing water closet. Grand Trunk closed the Mt. Clemens station in 1953, after which they used it for storage and other railroad-related services until at least 1972. In 1980, the building was purchased by the city of Mount Clemens, which restored the structure. It is currently leased from the city by the Michigan Transit Museum.

== Description ==
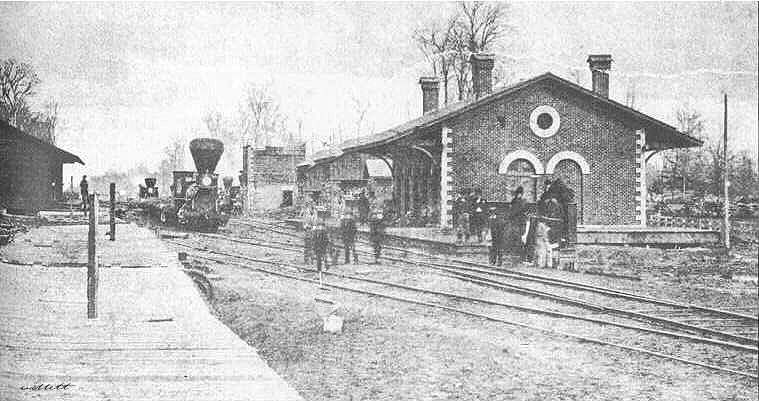
Station c. 1859

The Grand Trunk Western Rail Station in Mount Clemens is a one-story Italianate building, rectangular in plan and constructed of bricks on a stone foundation. The walls are mostly red brick, with yellow brick quoins and window hoods, and wooden trim. A wooden walkway runs the length of the street side of the building. The shingled gabled roof is supported with wooden brackets, and eaves extend eight feet from the walls. The long sides of the building are divided into five bays of arches. Of the five street side bay arches, three contain large windows, one contains a double entrance door, and the fifth arch is bricked with a small double-hung window inset. Of the five track side bay arches, two contain large windows, two contain double entrance doors, and the fifth arch is covered by a small projecting addition, which is a 1980s reconstruction of an 1880s telegraph operator's booth. The shorter, gabled ends are divided into two bays of arched windows, with a recessed ocular window above.

The interior of the structure is divided into two main parts: The southern section is the waiting room, and has wooden floors, wooden ceiling, and plaster walls with wainscoting. Entrances to a restroom and storage room are to one side. The northern section of the building is the staff work area, and has concrete floors, painted wooden ceiling, and plaster walls with wainscoting. An office and mechanical room are on one side, and the re-created telegraph bay is on the other. The dividing wall between the southern and northern section holds an access door and a re-created ticket office window, with a brass grill is from the demolished Grand Trunk Brush Street depot in Detroit.

North of the depot is a c. 1893 wooden clapboard water closet. It has a single entrance on one side and boarded windows on the other three.

== See also ==
- National Register of Historic Places listings in Macomb County, Michigan

Preceding station	Grand Trunk Western Railroad	Following station
Fraser toward Detroit	Detroit – Port Huron	Chesterfield toward Port Huron
