= Clinton–Kalamazoo Canal =

- Clinton-Kalamazoo Canal
- U.S. National Register of Historic Places
- Michigan State Historic Site
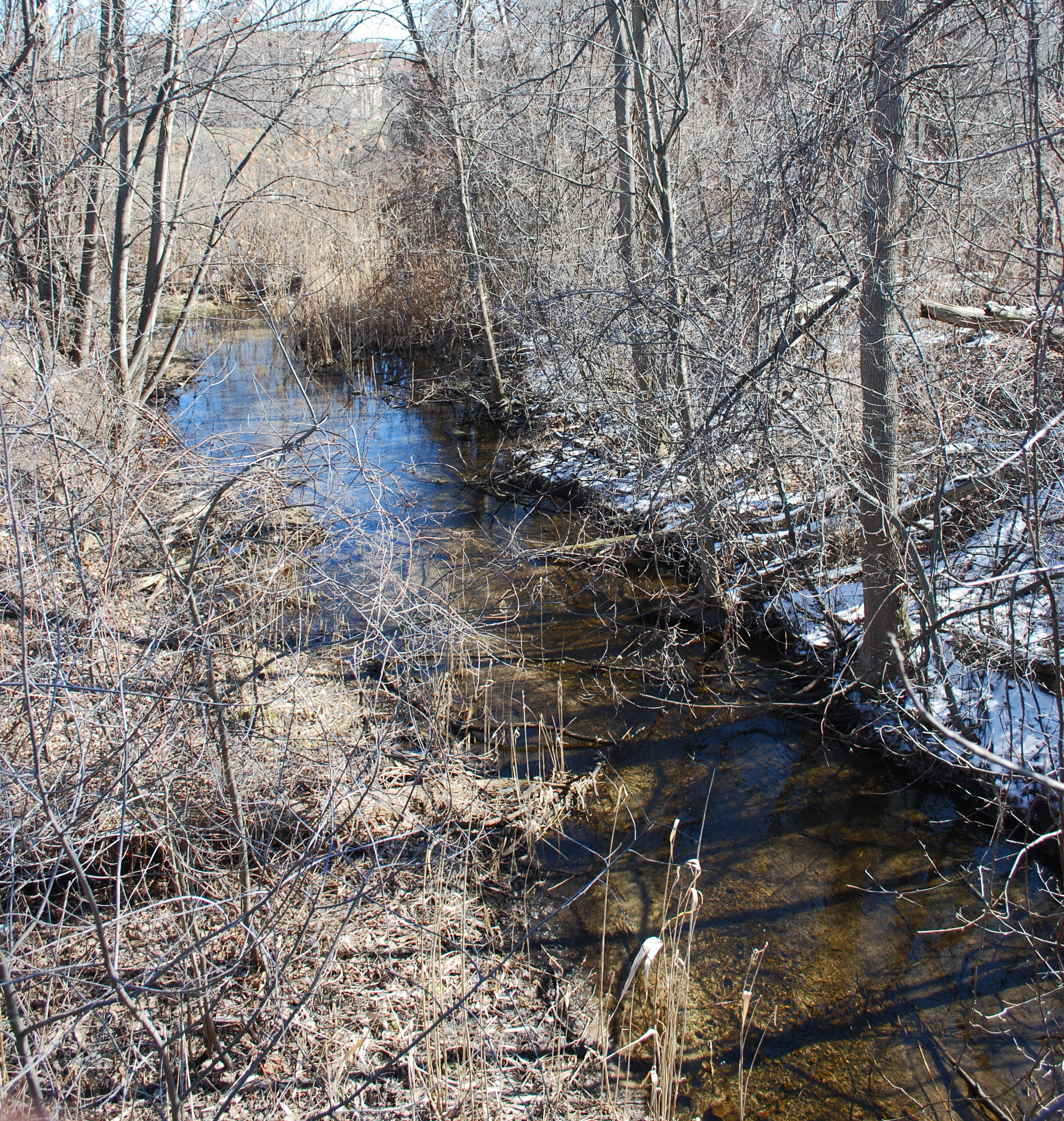

- Location within Michigan Location within the United States
- Interactive map
- Location: Clinton Township to Rochester
- Coordinates: 42°39′17″N 83°3′10″W
- Area: 51 acres (21 ha)
- Built: 1838
- NRHP reference No.: 72000638
- Added to NRHP: March 24, 1972

The Clinton–Kalamazoo Canal is a canal in Michigan that was abandoned after being only partially completed. The canal was to connect Lake St. Clair with Lake Michigan. Project backers were inspired by the success of the Erie Canal in New York, which was completed in 1825. After gaining statehood in 1837, Michigan elected its first governor, Stevens Thomson Mason, who initiated an ambitious program of internal improvements, including three railroads and two canals. On March 21, 1837, the Legislature authorized Governor Mason to contract a loan for the construction of the canal from Mt. Clemens to Rochester, a railroad from Shelby to Detroit, a railroad from Detroit across the State (the Michigan Central) and a railroad from Port Huron into the interior, to be known as the Port Huron & Grand River road. In the spring of 1838, a Board of Commissioners composed of seven men, was appointed to take charge of the canal work.

== History ==
As the primary inland waterway into Macomb County, the Clinton River served an essential role in the early days of the Michigan Territory. Both the cities of Mt Clemens and Utica were founded (in part) based on their proximity to the Clinton River and farmer-settlers flocking to the territory bought up land first along its shores.

Because rivers, at the time, were the only practical means of transporting goods, both Utica and Mt Clemens became important early towns. Utica, with its milling operations and neighboring farms, became an important dropping-off point for farmers looking to sell their crops. The cargo, loaded in Utica, was sent to Mt Clemens, which was already building itself as a primary supplier to the growing City of Detroit.

=== First Attempt at Regulating River Traffic: The Clinton River Navigation Company ===
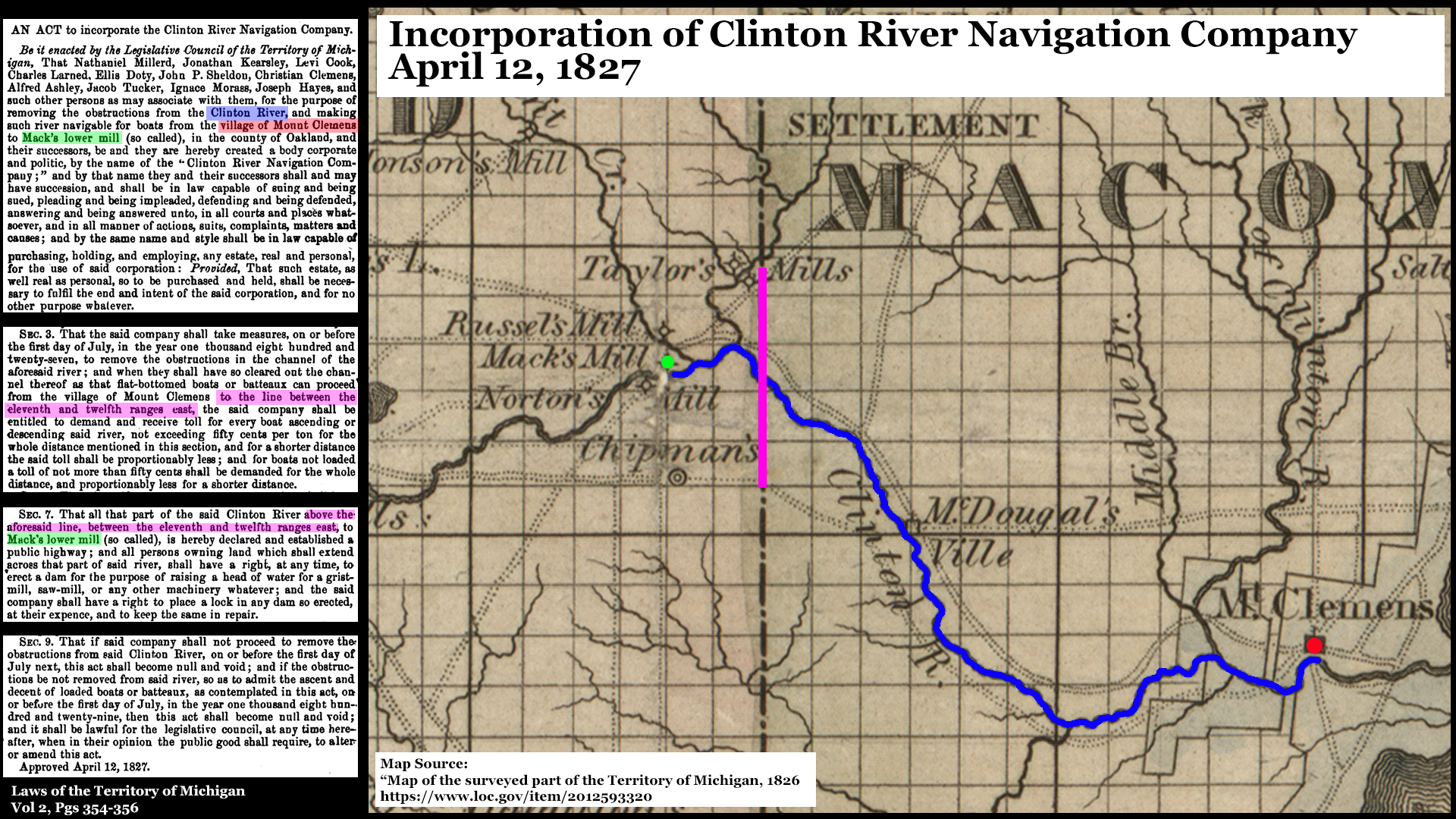
Incorporation of the Clinton River Navigation Company, 1827

The first attempt to regulate the flow of cargo and passengers along the Clinton River came in the form of the Clinton River Navigation Company; incorporated by the Territorial Government on April 12, 1827; authorized for the purpose of removing obstructions from the Clinton River, and making such river navigable for boats from the village of Mount Clemens to Mack's lower mills (so called), in the county of Oakland."

The length of this proposed private enterprise was about thirty miles, and it was calculated that it would afford invaluable shipping facilities to a large extent of rich agricultural country.

The incorporators of this company were Nathaniel Millard, Jonathan Kearsley, Levi Cook, Charles Larned, Ellis Doty, John R. Sheldon, Christian Clemens, Alfred Ashley, Jacob Tucker, Ignace Morass, and Joseph Hayes. The company were required, under the act of incorporation, to clear out the river to the east line of Oakland County, commencing on or before the first day of July, 1827, and when they had made it navigable for flat-bottomed boats or bateaux to the line of the county, they were to be entitled to collect toll, not exceeding fifty cents per ton for the whole distance and proportionally for less distances. When the river was made navigable as far as Mack's mill, and a good towpath constructed on one bank, the company were entitled to demand toll not exceeding seventy-five cents per ton for the whole distance and in proportion for a less distance.

Parties owning water power on the river below the east line of Oakland County were required to construct locks at every dam sufficient for the passage of the company's boats. The river above the said line was declared by the act of incorporation a public highway, but persons owning land extending across the river had the right to construct dams for water-power purposes by putting in the necessary locks, or the company could construct them at the expense of the parties owning the lands. The improvements were finally completed as far as Rochester, a portion of the State loan of five millions being appropriated to the work. Business was carried on to a small extent for a number of years, but the enterprise was never a prosperous one.

It is unknown whether this company met the requirements of its incorporation; or how long they were in operation if they succeeded.

=== The Clinton-Kalamazoo Canal ===
Following the success of the Erie Canal, and Michigan becoming a state in January 1837; several acts were passed providing for building of three railroads, and the Clinton–Kalamazoo Canal. These projects were to be financed through a $5 million loan; and payment for the loan would be funded through the states portion on future sale of public lands.

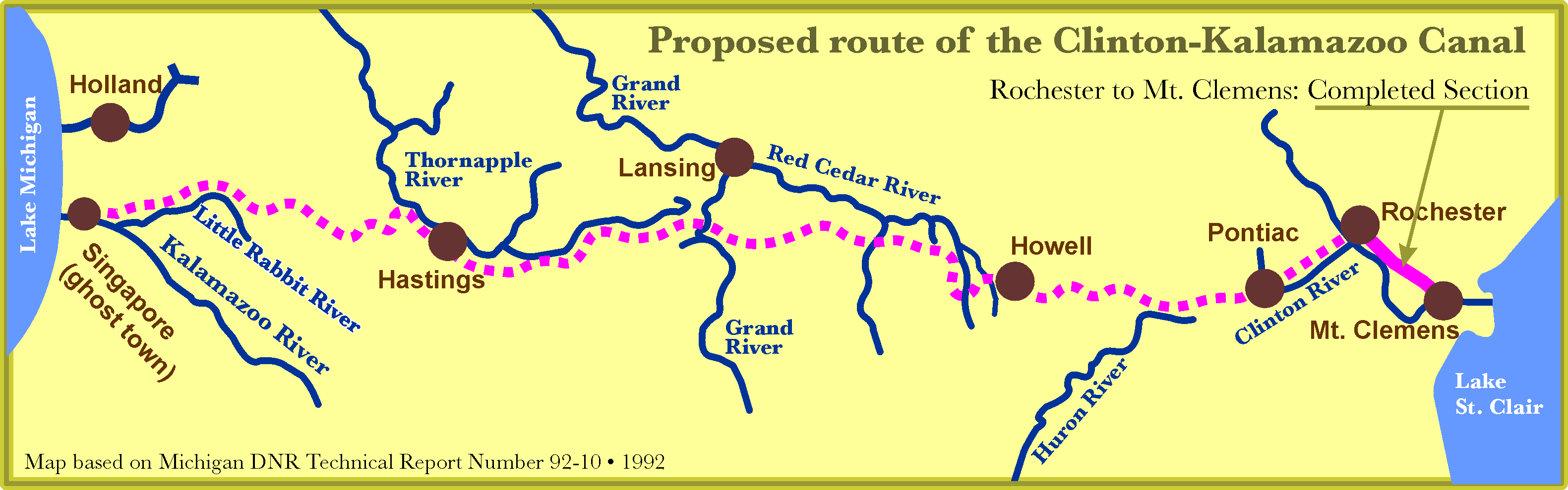
Map of proposed route of the Clinton-Kalamazoo Canal

The Clinton–Kalamazoo Canal was to begin in Mount Clemens on the banks of the Clinton River and continue through Utica, Rochester, Pontiac, Howell, Hastings, and finally to the mouth of the Kalamazoo River. In all, the canal was to span 216 miles. From Pontiac westward, the canal would carry new settlers and supplies to the interior of the state and eventually connect with the "thriving" Lake Michigan port of Singapore (now a ghost town). Singapore was to ship passengers and freight to Chicago across Lake Michigan.

Construction began in 1838 with much fanfare. The groundbreaking ceremony, held on August 8, 1838 was attended by many notable residents and involved parties; with Governor Mason attending, and taking the ceremonial first shovel.

Financial troubles related to the Panic of 1837 caused funding for the canal to disappear. All construction stopped in 1843 after only 13 miles had been completed. Many workers who were unpaid destroyed parts of the canal and stole supplies. Engineering miscalculations also contributed to the canal's failure, as the canal was dug too shallow and too narrow for heavy freight barges.

About 1844, Amos Brown, of Rochester, constructed and launched a log flatboat, and collecting a party of his friends, they proceeded to celebrate the occasion by a grand ride on the canal, but when they came to the first lock, they found their craft too wide to admit of a passage. The locks were constructed of logs, and the pressure of the super-incumbent earth against their sides had sprung them in, narrowing the space considerably. A fellow who had served a term in the State prison made quite a speculation by burning some of the locks and selling the old iron.

A dam was built at Frederick across the Clinton to supply the locks, and in 1845, boats were running from Utica to Frederick. That year, the revenue to the State from canal tolls was $46.90; the next year, it was $43.44; in 1847, the income was even less, and, in 1848, the canal was in disuse. After construction ended, the canal quickly fell into disrepair. Portions were used as a millrace to power watermills that operated until the 1940s. The canal was added to the National Register of Historic Places in 1972. The route of the canal has been marked by signs and historic markers.

== Today ==
Remnants of the canal are still visible in Rochester Hills in Oakland County and in Shelby Township, Utica and Clinton Township in Macomb County. Much of the canal is clearly visible in parks and along Canal Road in Clinton Township. In River Bends Park multiple mountain biking and hiking trails run along the edge of the canal. The remains of the aqueduct built over the Clinton River can be seen in Yates Park, and two wood dams can be seen in the river in Canal Park and Bloomer Park. No locks are visible along the canal but the locations of a few are known.

== See also ==
- National Register of Historic Places listings in Macomb County, Michigan
- National Register of Historic Places listings in Oakland County, Michigan
