= Holcombe Site =

Archaeological site in Michigan, United States

- U.S. National Register of Historic Places
- Michigan State Historic Site
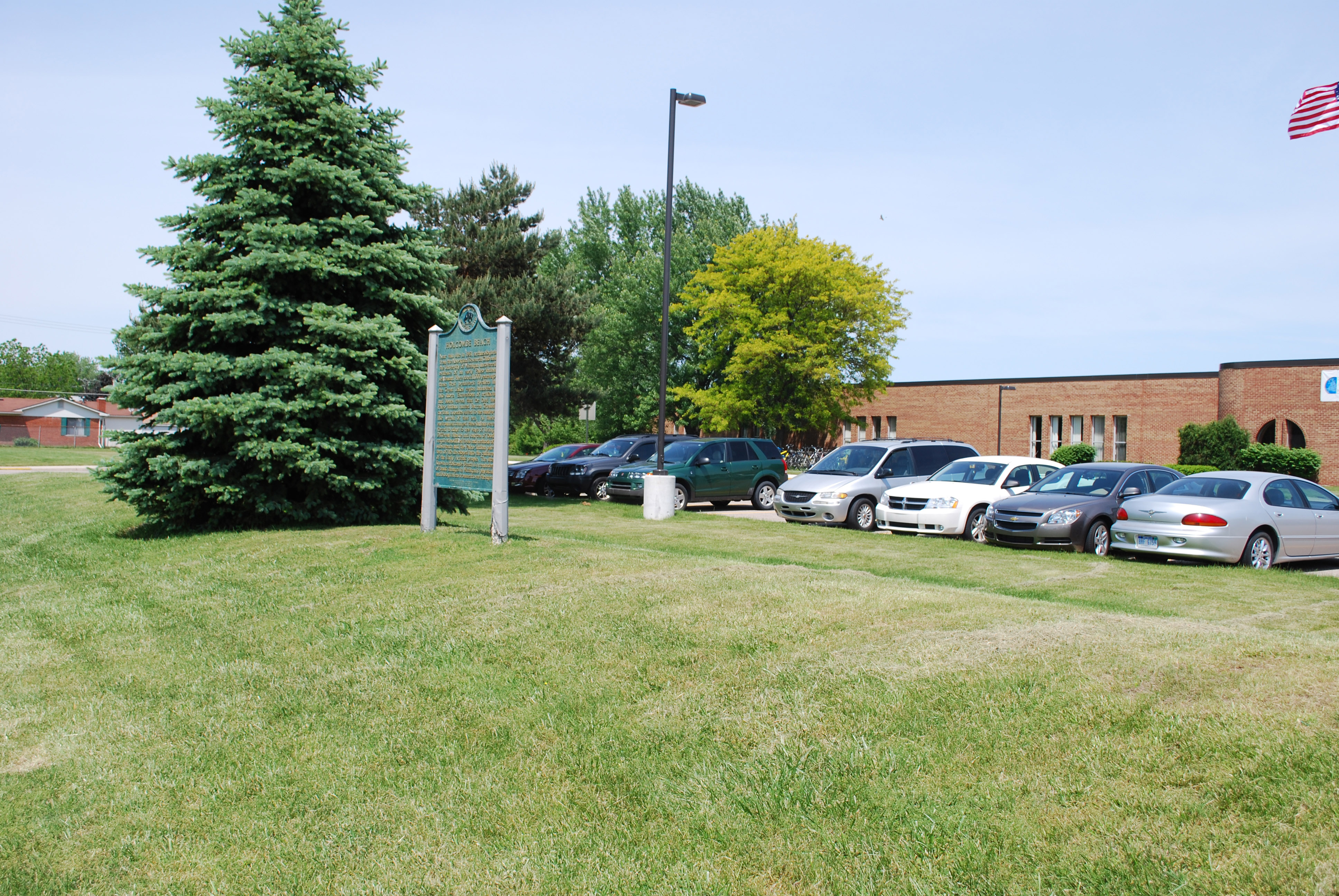
- The historic marker is placed "near" the Holcombe Site

- Location within Michigan Location within the United States
- Location: Intersection of Metropolitan Parkway and Dodge Park Road, Sterling Heights, Michigan
- Coordinates: 42°34′7″N 83°0′34″W
- Area: 1 acre (0.40 ha)
- NRHP reference No.: 71001023

Significant dates
- Added to NRHP: April 16, 1971
- Designated MSHS: July 17, 1970

The Holcombe Site, also known as Holcombe Beach, is a Paleo-Indian archaeological site located near the intersection of Metropolitan Parkway and Dodge Park Road in Sterling Heights, Michigan, United States. It was listed on the National Register of Historic Places in 1971 and designated a Michigan State Historic Site in 1970.

== Site discovery ==
In 1961, amateur archaeologists Jerome DeVisscher and Edward J. Wahla discovered evidence of an ancient settlement at this site. Later radiocarbon dating of hearth elements determined the site to be an 11,000-year-old Paleo-Indian settlement. A five-year dig by archaeologists from the University of Michigan uncovered numerous artifacts. The distinctive small, thin, fluted arrowheads found at the site were dubbed "Holcombe points;" similar flint arrowheads have been found at other sites in Michigan and southern Ontario, with scatterings in northern Ohio, Indiana, Wisconsin, and Minnesota.

== Historical description of the site ==
The Holcombe site was situated on what was, at the time it was occupied, the strandline of a small glacial lake that probably drained into nearby Lake Algonquin. Arrowheads, flint chips, and bone fragments were recovered, indicating that these Paleo-Indians hunted Barren-ground Caribou, a species particularly adapted to the tundra-like conditions that existed at the time. The site yielded evidence of the Indigenous people's change in culture and subsistence as the climate in the area changed.

== See also ==
- National Register of Historic Places listings in Macomb County, Michigan
