= Erin–Warren Fractional District No. 2 Schoolhouse =

School building in Eastpointe, Michigan

- U.S. National Register of Historic Places
- Michigan State Historic Site
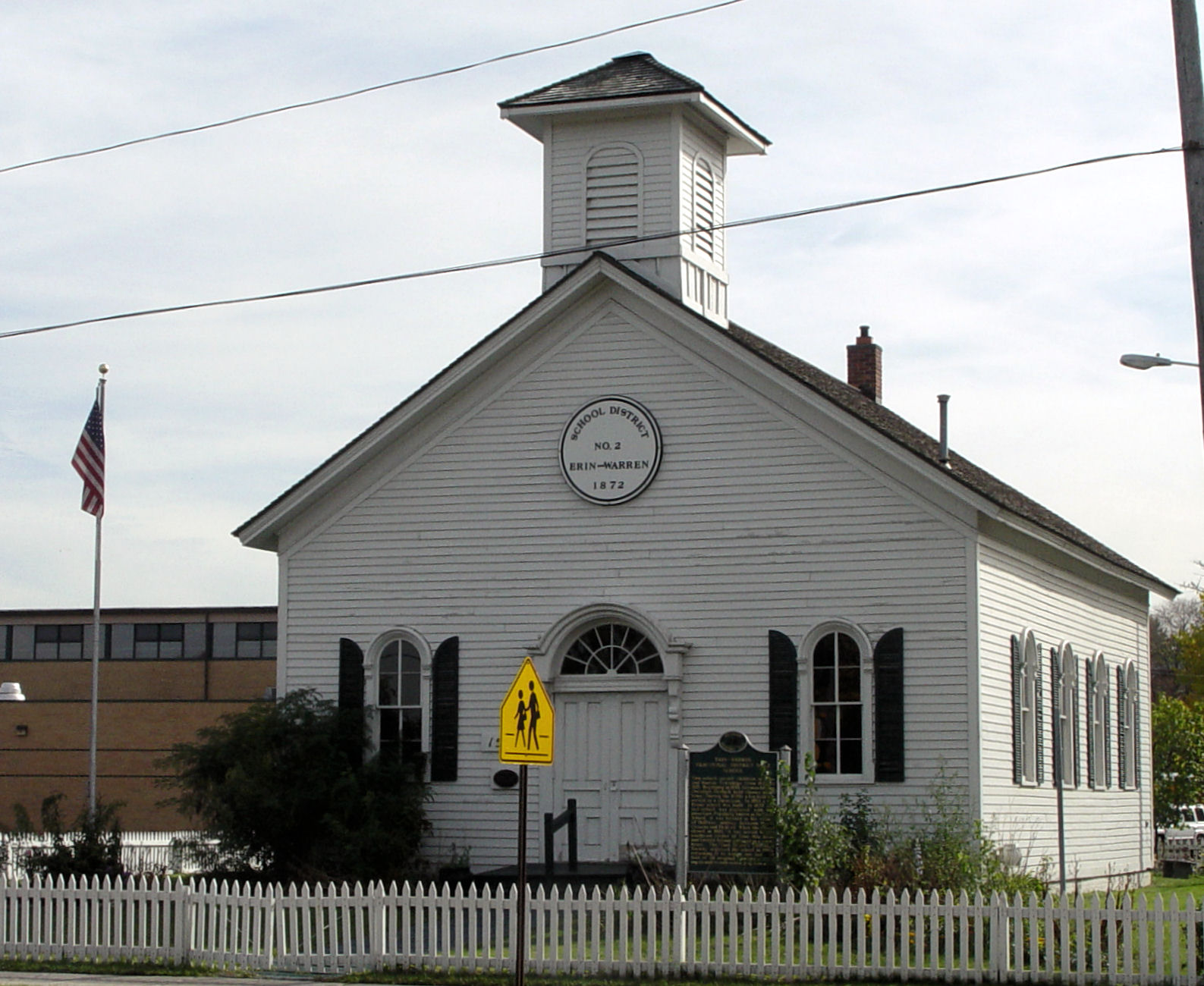

- Location within Michigan Location within the United States
- Interactive map
- Location: 15500 Nine Mile Rd., Eastpointe, Michigan
- Coordinates: 42°27′53″N 82°57′52″W
- Built: 1872
- Architectural style: Italianate
- NRHP reference No.: 01000412

Significant dates
- Added to NRHP: April 30, 2001
- Designated MSHS: January 16, 1990

The Erin–Warren Fractional District No. 2 Schoolhouse, also known as the Halfway Schoolhouse, is a school building located at 15500 Nine Mile Road in Eastpointe, Michigan, United States. It was listed on the National Register of Historic Places in 2001 and designated a Michigan State Historic Site in 1990.

== History ==
The first school classes offered in the village of Halfway (now the city of Eastpointe) were held in 1838 in the home of German farmer Christian Gerlach. A log building was used as a classroom in the 1840s, and in 1850 a red frame schoolhouse was built, serving children in Erin and Warren townships. In 1872, the earlier school was replaced with this structure, built facing Grove Road at Nine Mile. A wing was added to the school in 1901, and it was used for school classes until 1921, when a new brick building, the Erin School, was constructed.

After the school was closed, it was sold to Kaiser Fuel and Supply, who moved it to the southeast corner of Nine Mile Road and Gratiot Avenue and used the structure as a warehouse, although it remained essentially unaltered. In 1984, the East Detroit Historical Society purchased the building, and moved it once more to within 60 feet of its original site. The historical society restored the building to its original appearance, and in 1987 added a small rear annex housing lavatories.

== Description ==
The Halfway Schoolhouse is a one-story front-gabled structure with clapboard siding trimmed with cornerboards and surmounted with a frieze. The front facade is symmetrical, with a double-door entry with fanlight and an arched hoodmold, flanked by sash windows. A roundel containing the school name and date of construction is placed high above the door. A pyramid-roofed belfry with flag staff sits atop the cedar-shake roof. Each side of the structure has four windows identical to the front windows, and the rear has a small modern gabled annex.

On the inside, the walls are plastered and wainscoted, and the original hardwood floor is still in place. A cloakroom is located to the left of the entrance, and the original wood stove is located toward the rear of the building. The room is furnished with pupil's desks, kerosine reflector lamps, and a slate chalkboard. The structure is an essentially unaltered example of a vernacular one-room schoolhouse.

== See also ==
- National Register of Historic Places listings in Macomb County, Michigan
