= Warren Township District No. 4 School =

- U.S. National Register of Historic Places
- Michigan State Historic Site
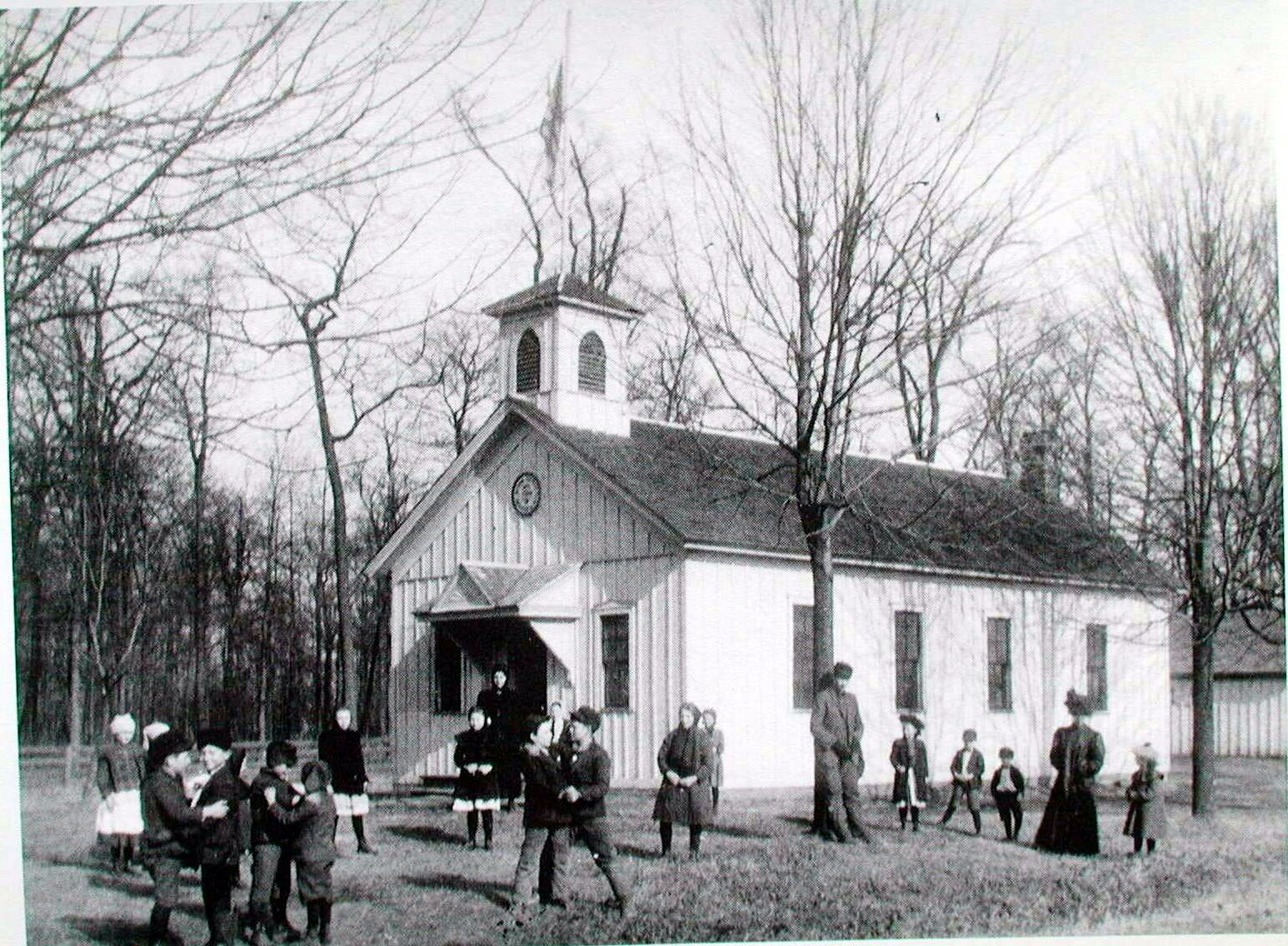

- Location within Michigan Location within the United States
- Interactive map
- Location: 27900 Bunert Rd., Warren, Michigan
- Coordinates: 42°29′57″N 82°58′33″W
- Built: 1875
- NRHP reference No.: 12000308

Significant dates
- Added to NRHP: May 29, 2012
- Designated MSHS: April 20, 1989

The Warren Township District No. 4 School, also known as the Bunert School, is a one-room schoolhouse building located at 27900 Bunert Road in Warren, Michigan. It was listed on the National Register of Historic Places in 2012 and designated a Michigan State Historic Site in 1989. It is the last one-room schoolhouse remaining in Warren.

== History ==
In January 1875, August and Mine Bunert sold a plot of land at the northeast corner of the intersection of Bunert and Martin Roads to the Warren School District for the purpose of constructing a school. The district constructed this one-room schoolhouse on the site later in the year, formally known as the Warren Township District No. 4 School, but commonly called the Bunert School after the original landowners. The building was used for K-8 students until 1928, when a second building was constructed nearby for older students. The original Bunert School was then used for K-4 until 1944, when the nearby Charwood School was built. That span makes the school the longest-used one-room schoolhouse in Warren.

After 1944, the district used the structure as a meeting hall; it was later sold to John O'Connor (along with the 1928 structure), and converted into a six-room residence. The Santa Maria Lodge purchased both buildings in 1970. In 1987, the Lodge offered the 1875 building to the Warren Historical Society, who raised $22,000 to restore it. The structure was moved to its present location in 1988, and is used as an educational museum. The 1927 school is still in its original location.

== Description ==
The Warren Township District No. 4 School is a single-story wood frame structure with a gable roof sitting on a concrete foundation. The exterior is covered with board and batten siding, and the interior has wooden floors, tin ceiling, and wooden wainscoting.

== See also ==
- National Register of Historic Places listings in Macomb County, Michigan
