= William Upton House =

Historic house in Michigan, United States

- U.S. National Register of Historic Places
- Michigan State Historic Site
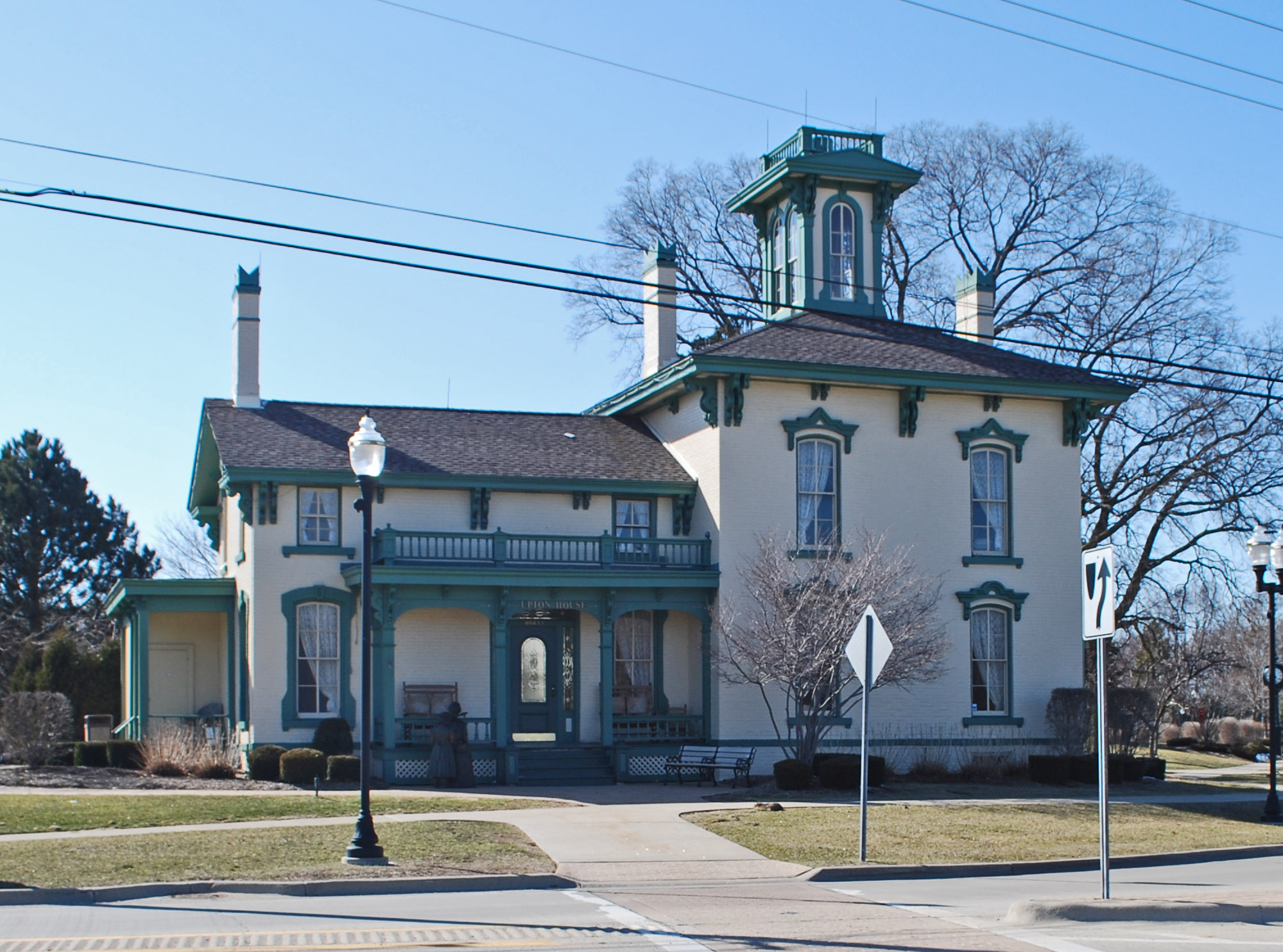

- Location within Michigan Location within the United States
- Interactive map showing the location of William Upton House
- Location: 40433 Utica Rd., Sterling Heights, Michigan
- Coordinates: 42°35′29″N 83°0′42″W
- Built: 1867
- Architectural style: Italianate
- NRHP reference No.: 86002113

Significant dates
- Added to NRHP: July 31, 1986
- Designated MSHS: October 27, 1983

The William Upton House was built as a private residence located at 40433 Utica Road in Sterling Heights, Michigan, United States. It was listed on the National Register of Historic Places in 1985 and designated a Michigan State Historic Site in 1983.

== History ==
William Upton was born in 1835 in Leicestershire, England, and immigrated to the United States with his parents in 1841. The Uptons first settled in Detroit, then moved to Sterling Township in 1845. In 1861, William Upton married Sarah Jeanette Aldrich, and in 1866-67 he built this house on his farm. Upton was a successful and prosperous farmer, and also sold fish caught in the Clinton River, and by 1891 the farm spread out over 138 acres. William and Sarah Upton lived in this house until 1891, when they moved to Utica and purchased a three-story commercial building.

William Upton ran a successful mercantile and real estate business in the Utica building until 1897, when he sold the business (but not the building). In 1897, Upton became general manager of the local Salvation Army. Upton's building was destroyed by fire in 1904, and he was seriously injured trying to protect it. Soon afterward, the Uptons moved to Rochester, where William Upton died in 1923 and Sarah Upton died in 1925.

In 1891, the Uptons sold the house to Frederick Ahrens, who lived there until 1913. In 1913, the farm was purchased by Fred and Augusta Heldt, who lived there from 1913 to 1927. In 1922, Heldt conveyed part of the farm to the state of Michigan to create Dodge Park. Stella Boylan purchased the house in 1927, and afterward a number of owners and renters lived there. Although the exterior of the house was originally natural brick, at some point in the 1940s or 50s it was painted. In 1964, the house was purchased by the Macomb Child Guidance Center, and later the city of Sterling Heights bought the building for use by the Parks and Recreation Department. The Upton House was restored in 1981–82, at which time the interior was converted to house public offices.

== Description ==
The Upton House is a two-story Italianate-style house constructed of brick with a hipped roof and tall cupola. The brick construction indicates the relative affluence of the builder. The exterior is painted and heavy brackets support the eaves. Windows are tall, double-hung, four-over-four lights; the ones on the front facade feature ornate stone hoods while windows on the other sides have brick hoods. A 1 1/2-story, gable-roofed addition is located on one side, and a flat-roofed, single-story addition is on another. The cupola, porches, chimneys, and bay window balustrade were reconstructed during the 1981-82 renovation.

== Gallery ==
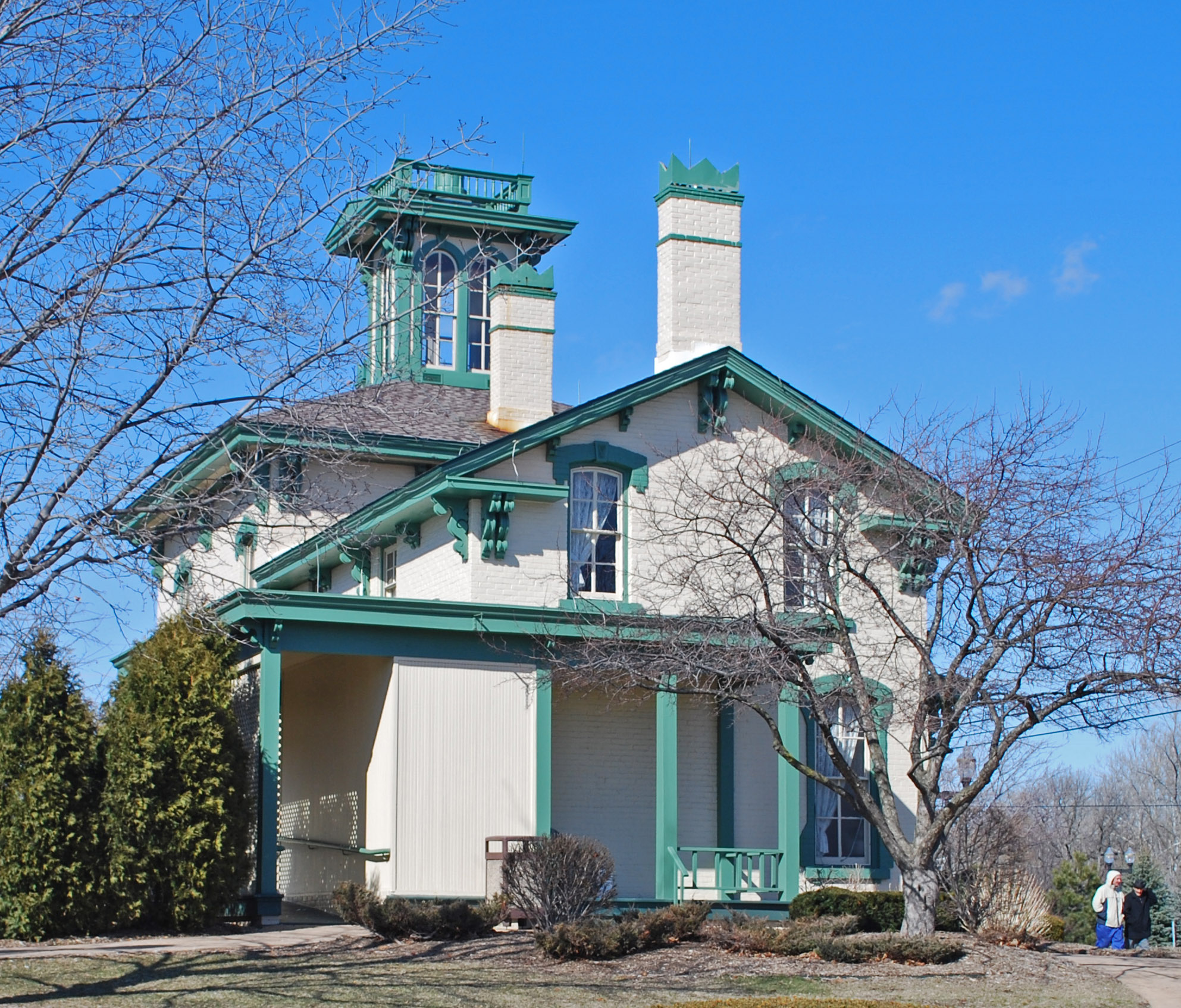

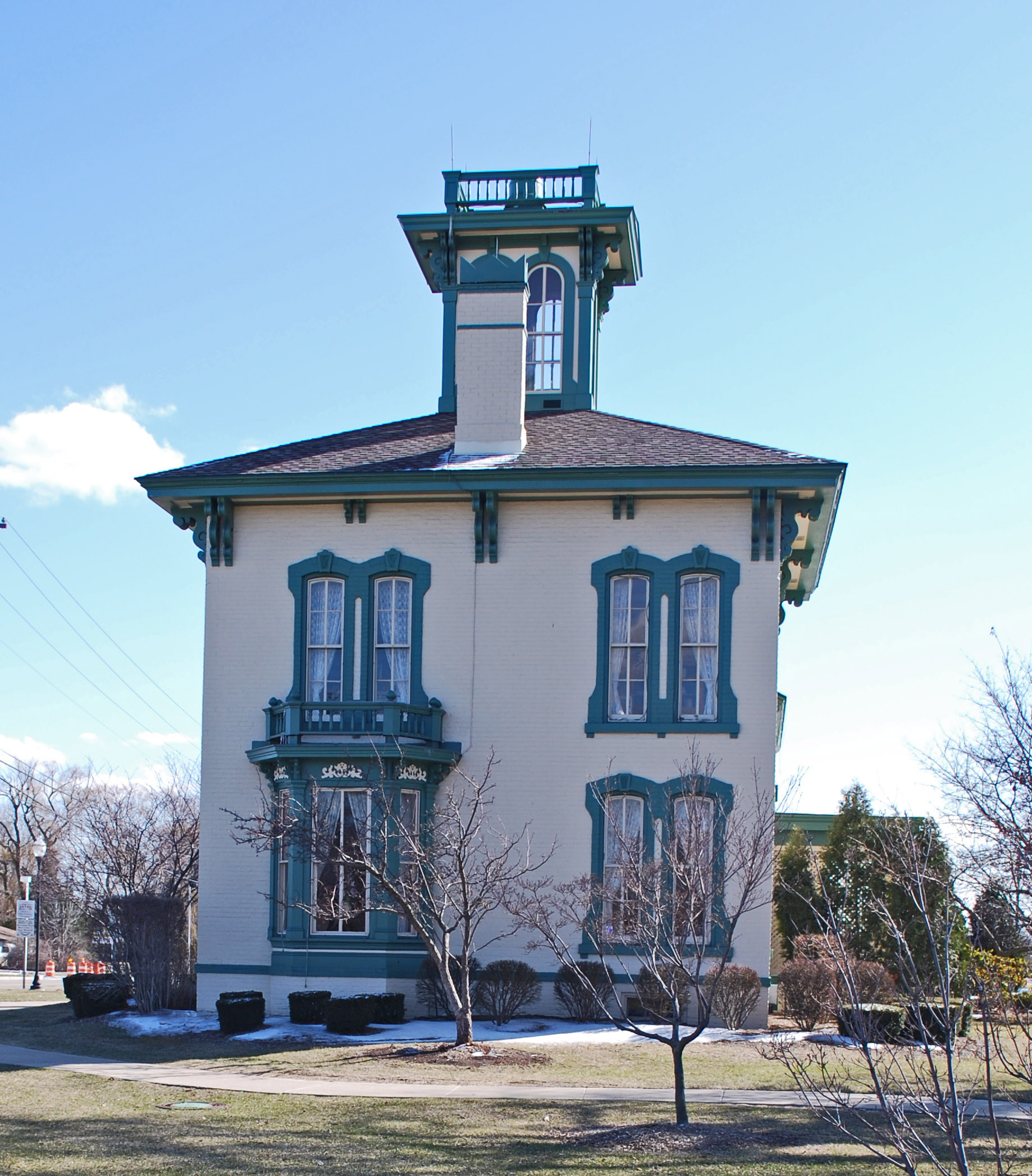

== See also ==
- National Register of Historic Places listings in Macomb County, Michigan
