= First Congregational Church (Richmond, Michigan) =

Historic church in Michigan, United States

- U.S. National Register of Historic Places
- Michigan State Historic Site
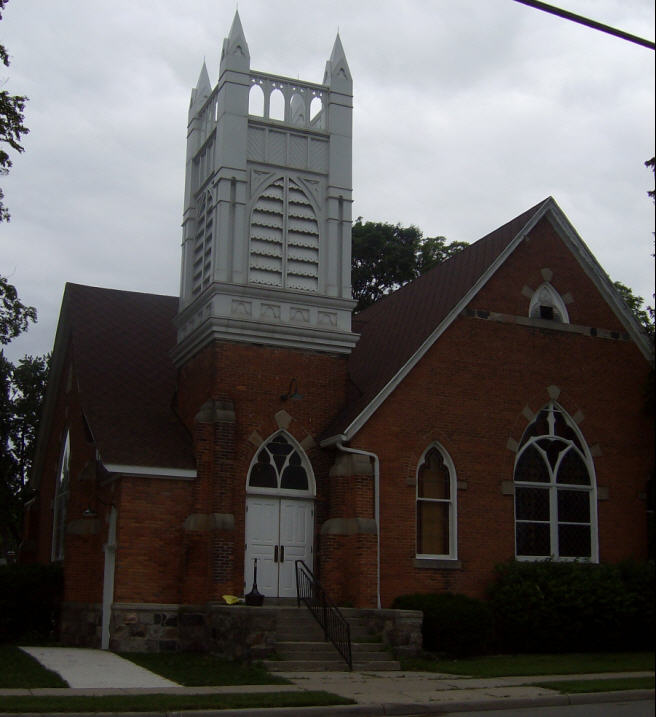

- Location within Michigan Location within the United States
- Interactive map
- Location: 69619 Parker, Richmond, Michigan
- Coordinates: 42°48′49″N 82°45′37″W
- Built: 1887
- Built by: Charles W. McCauley
- Architectural style: Gothic Revival
- NRHP reference No.: 75000954

Significant dates
- Added to NRHP: December 6, 1975
- Designated MSHS: April 4, 1975

The First Congregational Church, currently known as the Richmond Center for the Performing Arts, is a church building located at 69619 Parker in Richmond, Michigan, and is the oldest public building in the city. It was listed on the National Register of Historic Places and designated a Michigan State Historic Site in 1975.

== History ==
In 1871, a group of Richmond settlers formed the First Congregational Church. The congregation's first church was built in 1872, and in 1887, the congregation hired local builder Charles W. McCauley to build a second church. In 1973, the congregation of the First Congregational Church merged with nearby St. Paul's Evangelical and Reformed Church, and the building was sold to the Richmond Community Theatre. The theatre group restored the exterior of the church, and adapted the interior for use as a theatre. As of 2011, the building houses the Richmond Center for the Performing Arts and is administered by the Richmond Board of Education.

== Description ==
Richmond's First Congregational Church is a Gothic Revival structure constructed of red brick on a fieldstone foundation. The front facade is asymmetrical, with a square tower with wooden belfry standing to one side of the entrance. Stepped buttresses and lancet windows containing tracery decorate the exterior, making the building a significant and well-reserved example of 19th-century Gothic Revival architecture.
