= Bruce Township, Macomb County, Michigan =

Bruce Township, Michigan
- Civil township
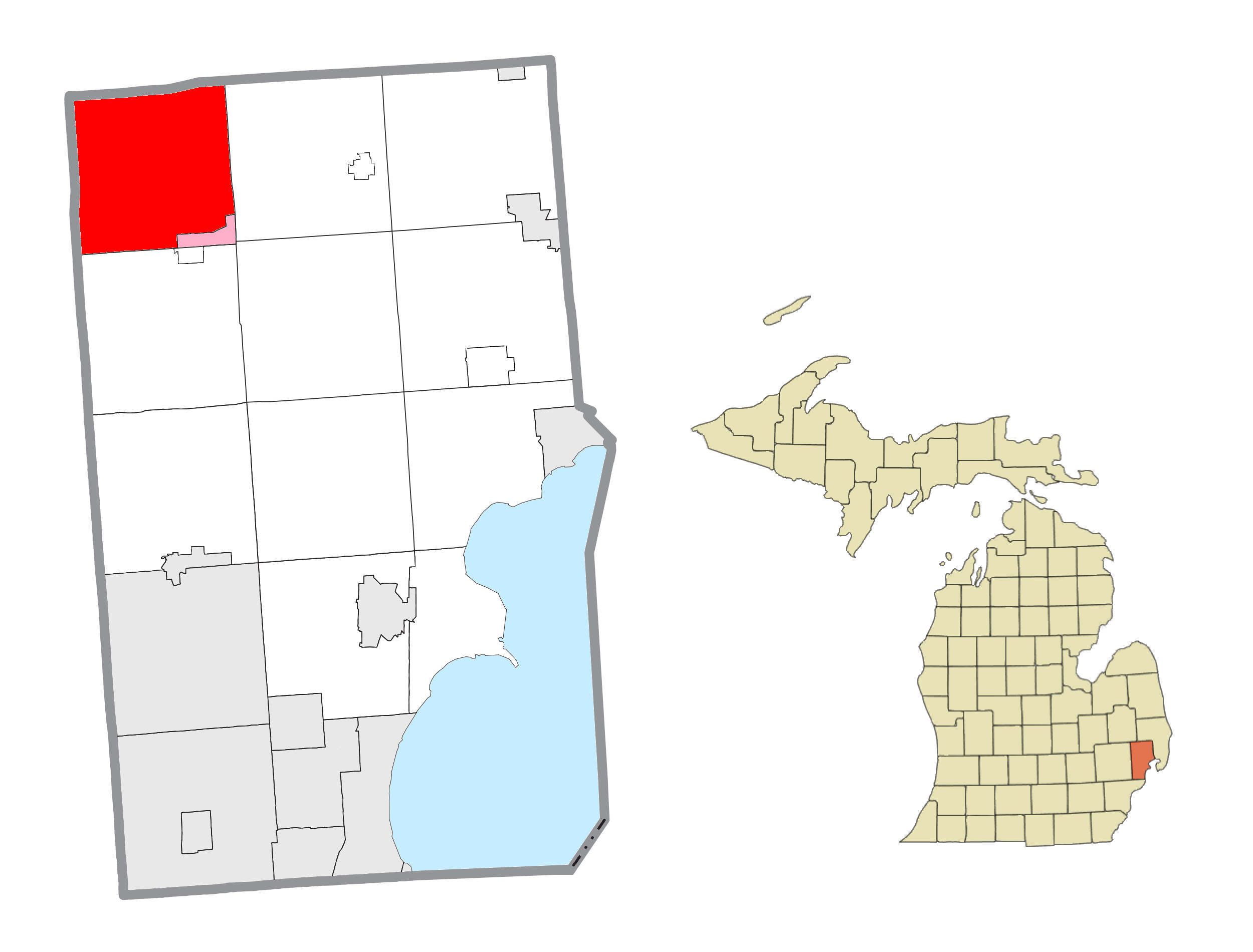
- Location within Macomb County (red) and an administered portion of the Romeo village (pink)

- Location within Michigan Location within the United States
- Coordinates: 42°49′36″N 83°01′47″W
- Country: United States
- State: Michigan
- County: Macomb

Government
  - Type: General Law Township

Area
  - Total: 37.15 sq mi (96.2 km^{2})
  - Land: 36.74 sq mi (95.2 km^{2})
  - Water: 0.42 sq mi (1.1 km^{2})
- Elevation: 823 ft (251 m)

Population (2020)
  - Total: 9,324
  - Density: 253.8/sq mi (98.0/km^{2})
- Time zone: UTC-5 (Eastern (EST))
  - Summer (DST): UTC-4 (EDT)
- ZIP Code: 48065
- Area code: 586
- FIPS code: 26-11300
- GNIS feature ID: 1625995
- Website: www.brucetwp.org

Bruce Township is a civil township of Macomb County in the U.S. state of Michigan. As of the 2020 census, the township population was 9,324. The largely rural township is home to the Ford Motor Company Proving Grounds, which sits on 6 square miles (16 km^{2}) of land in the western-central part of the township.

== History ==
Prehistoric aborigines occupied the area periodically. There is a very prominent Indian mound that was so obvious Scottish pioneers used it as a landmark. Bruce Township was organized in 1833.

== Geography ==
The township occupies the northwest corner of Macomb County, with Oakland County on its western border and Lapeer County on its northern border. According to the United States Census Bureau, the township has a total area of 37.2 square miles (96 km^{2}), of which 36.7 square miles (95 km^{2}) are land and 0.4 square miles (1 km^{2}), or 1.12%, are water.

The highest point in Macomb County, Twombly Mountain, lies within the Ford Motor Company Proving Grounds, rising to an altitude of 1,150 feet (350 meters).

== Communities ==
Much of the village of Romeo lies within the southeast corner of the township.

== Demographics ==
As of the census of 2000, there were 8,158 people, 2,806 households, and 2,267 families residing in the township. The population density was 224.1 inhabitants per square mile (86.5/km^{2}). There were 2,919 housing units at an average density of 80.2 per square mile (31.0/km^{2}). The racial makeup of the township was 95.88% White, 1.79% African American, 0.37% Native American, 0.40% Asian, 0.06% Pacific Islander, 0.43% from other races, and 1.07% from two or more races. Hispanic or Latino of any race were 1.75% of the population.

There were 2,806 households, out of which 40.0% had children under the age of 18 living with them, 69.6% were married couples living together, 7.6% had a female householder with no husband present, and 19.2% were non-families. 15.9% of all households were made up of individuals, and 5.2% had someone living alone who was 65 years of age or older. The average household size was 2.90 and the average family size was 3.25.

In the township the population was spread out, with 29.1% under the age of 18, 7.3% from 18 to 24, 30.5% from 25 to 44, 24.7% from 45 to 64, and 8.5% who were 65 years of age or older. The median age was 36 years. For every 100 females, there were 102.9 males. For every 100 females age 18 and over, there were 101.4 males.

The median income for a household in the township was $65,469, and the median income for a family was $73,733. Males had a median income of $60,379 versus $31,052 for females. The per capita income for the township was $27,561. About 2.6% of families and 4.1% of the population were below the poverty line, including 5.6% of those under age 18 and 9.4% of those age 65 or over.

== Notable people ==
- Lisa McClain, U.S. representative
- Neil E. Reid, chief justice of the Michigan Supreme Court
