= Washington Township, Macomb County, Michigan =

Charter Township of Washington
- Charter township
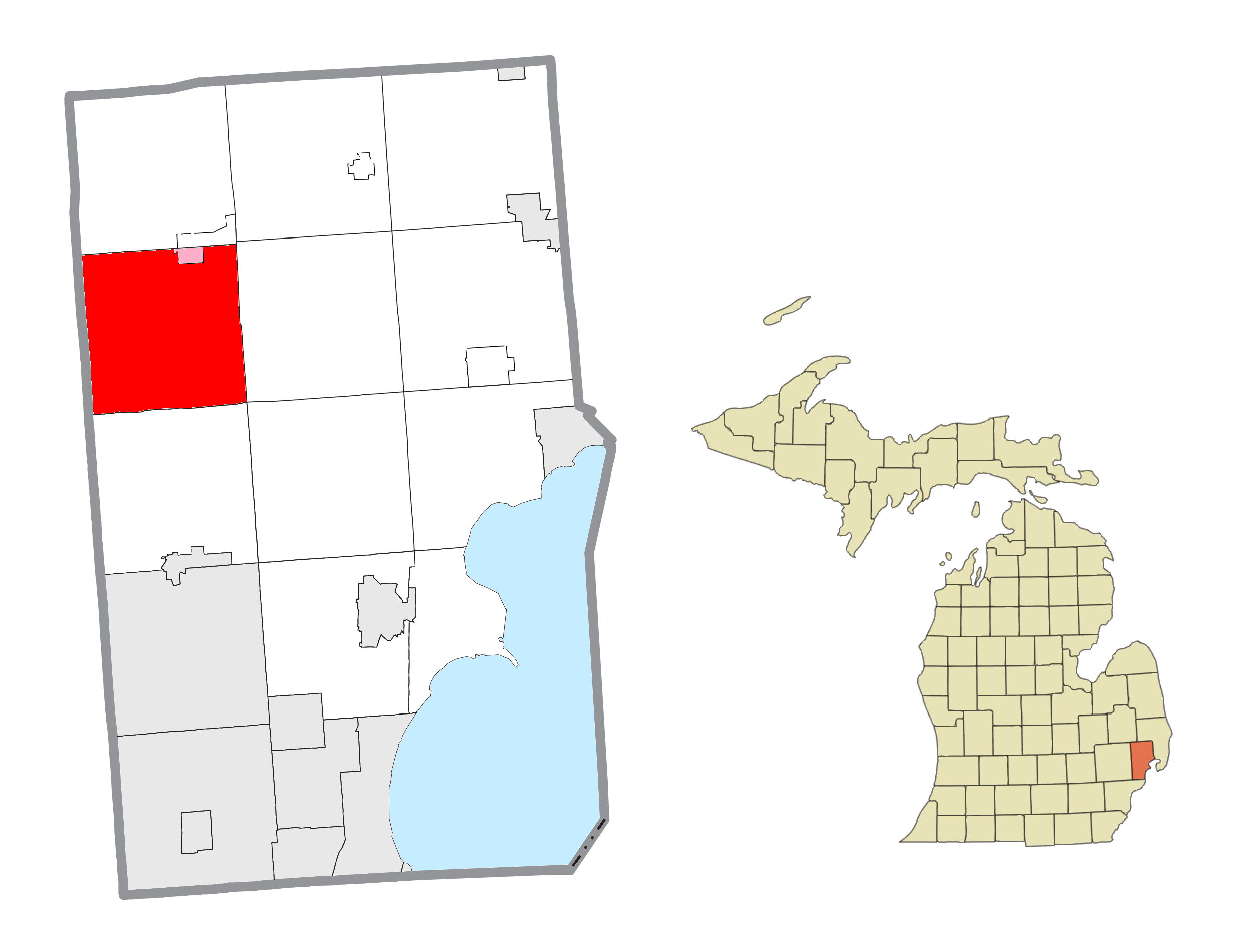
- Location within Macomb County (red) and an administered portion of the Romeo village (pink)

- Location within Michigan Location within the United States
- Coordinates: 42°45′00″N 83°01′56″W
- Country: United States
- State: Michigan
- County: Macomb

Government
  - Type: Council
  - Supervisor: Sebastian "Sam" Previti

Area
  - Total: 36.9 sq mi (96 km^{2})
  - Land: 35.6 sq mi (92 km^{2})
  - Water: 1.3 sq mi (3.4 km^{2})
- Elevation: 781 ft (238 m)

Population (2020)
  - Total: 28,165
  - Density: 791.7/sq mi (305.7/km^{2})
- Time zone: UTC-5 (Eastern (EST))
  - Summer (DST): UTC-4 (EDT)
- ZIP Codes: 48065, 48094, 48095, 48306
- Area codes: 248 and 586
- FIPS code: 26-84120
- GNIS feature ID: 1627216
- Website: www.washingtontownship.org

Washington Charter Township, located within Metro Detroit, is a charter township of Macomb County in the U.S. state of Michigan. The population was 28,165 at the 2020 census, up from 25,139 in 2010.

== History ==
Washington Township was organized in 1827. It is home to the historic Octagon House, built by Loren Andrus from 1858 to 1860.

Westview Orchards was founded in what is now Washington Township in 1813. The Mount Vernon Cemetery, located at the southeast corner of Mt. Vernon Road and 28 Mile Road, is evidence of a former settlement, named for George Washington's estate. The village of Mount Vernon once had a post office with William Austin Burt as its first postmaster in 1832.

== Geography ==
Washington Township is in northwestern Macomb County and is bordered to the west by Oakland County. The village of Romeo is partially in the northeast part of the township. Ray Township is to the east, Shelby Township is to the south, and Bruce Township is to the north. Washington Township is 28 to 34 miles (45 to 55 km) north of downtown Detroit.

According to the United States Census Bureau, the township has a total area of 36.9 square miles (96 km^{2}), of which 35.6 square miles (92 km^{2}) are land and 1.3 square miles (3.4 km^{2}), or 3.46%, are water.

== Communities ==
- Clifton Mills is an unincorporated community near the intersection of 31 Mile Rd. and Mt. Vernon Rd. (42°47′06″N 83°05′10″W; Elevation: 853 ft./260 m.).
- Mount Vernon is an unincorporated community in the southwest portion of the township at Mt. Vernon and 28 Mile Roads (42°44′31″N 83°05′13″W; Elevation: 830 ft./253 m.).
- Romeo is a village in the northeast corner of the township. Most of the village is in adjacent Bruce Township.
- Washington is an unincorporated community in the south central portion of the township just west of M-53 at 42°43′28″N 83°02′10″W. Located at the intersection of North 26 Mile Rd. and VanDyke Ave.

== Weather ==
Weather in Washington Township (an outer suburb of Detroit) is similar to Detroit, generally being only a few degrees cooler allowing for more snow in the winter.

A notable weather event occurred on July 2, 1997, when during the Michigan Tornado Outbreak an F0 tornado touched down at 26 Mile Road and destroyed parts of the East Village Estates trailer park community. Six people were injured during the events.

== Demographics ==
As of the census of 2010, there were 25,139 people (up from 19,080 in 2000), 9,258 households, and 7,160 families residing in the township. The population density was 699.2 inhabitants per square mile (270.0/km^{2}). There were 9,258 occupied housing units and 612 vacant units. The racial makeup of the township was 94.8% White, 1.6% African American, 0.2% Native American, 1.0% Asian, 0.04% Pacific Islander, 1.0% from other races, and 1.3% from two or more races. Hispanic or Latino people of any race were 3.9% of the population.

There were 9,258 households, out of which 32.9% had children under the age of 18 living with them, 64.9% were married couples living together, 8.9% had a female householder with no husband present, and 22.7% were non-families. 19.2% of all households were made up of individuals, and 7.6% had someone living alone who was 65 years of age or older. The average household size was 2.70 and the average family size was 3.11.

In the township the population was spread out, with 25.0% under the age of 18, 7.3% from 18 to 24, 23.3% from 25 to 44, 30.3% from 45 to 64, and 14.1% who were 65 years of age or older. The median age was 41 years. For every 100 females, there were 97.8 males. For every 100 females age 18 and over, there were 94.7 males.

The median income for a household in the township was $68,841 in 2000 and $83,348 in 2016; the median income for a family was $78,988 in 2000 and $94,057 in 2016. In 2000, males had a median income of $60,721 versus $31,213 for females. The per capita income for the township was $38,657. About 5.7% of families and 7.1% of the population were below the poverty line (up from 2.8% of families and 3.7% of all individuals in 2000), including 9.6% of those under age 18 (up from 5.0% in 2000) and 5.9% of those age 65 or over (up from 2.7% in 2000).

== Government ==
The township has a supervisor-board style government with an elected supervisor, clerk, treasurer and four trustees.

The school districts serving the township residents are Romeo Community Schools, Utica Community Schools, and Rochester Schools from Oakland County.

== Notable people ==
- Nick Blankenburg (b. 1998), professional hockey player in the NHL, currently contracted to the Nashville Predators
- Austin Czarnik (b. 1992), professional hockey player for Lausanne HC of the National League (NL).
- Jim Price (catcher), professional baseball player and broadcaster for the Detroit Tigers
