= Macomb County, Michigan =

County in Michigan, United States

- Charter County
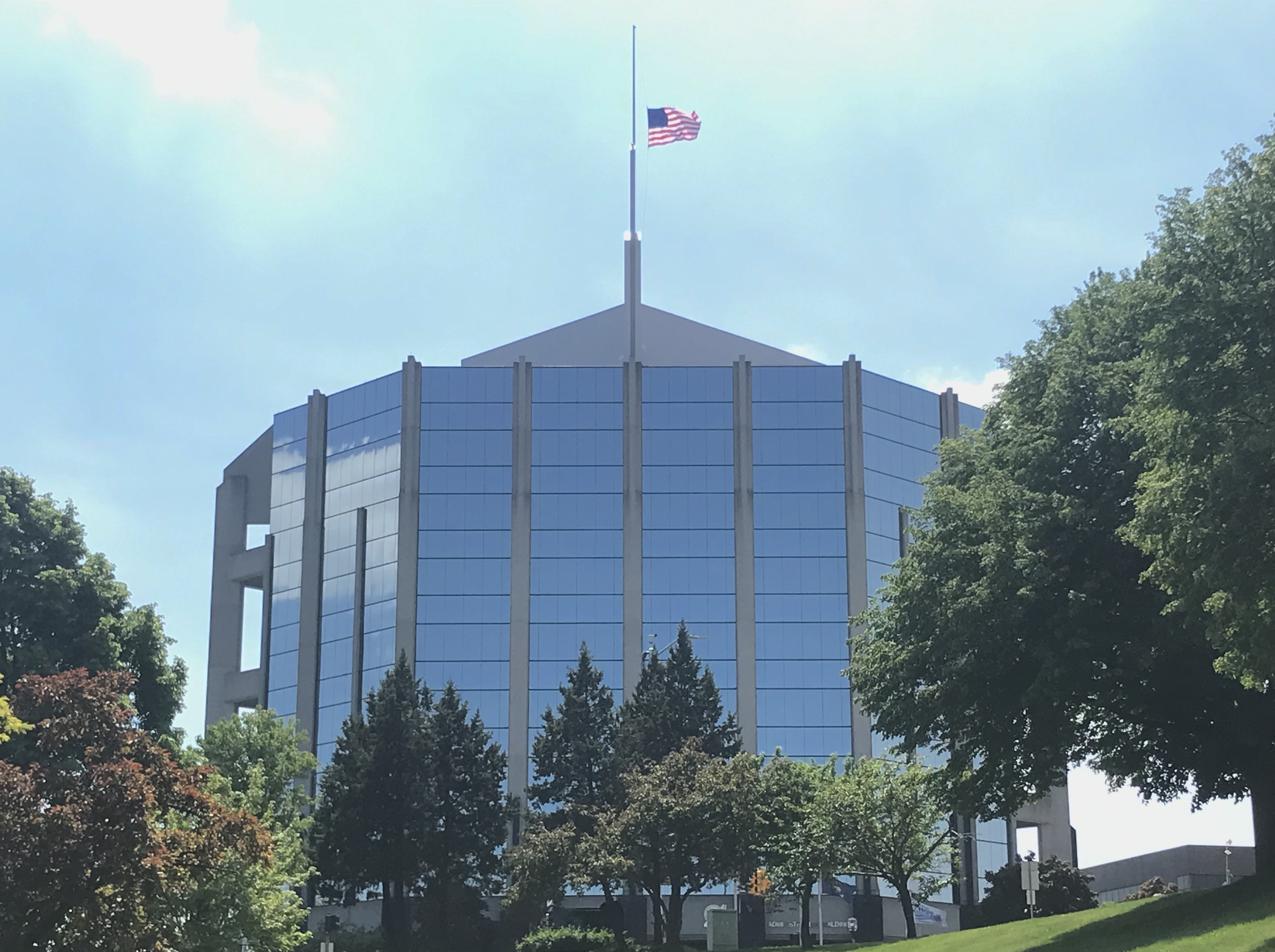
- Macomb County Administration Building in Mount Clemens, Michigan

- Seal

- Location within the U.S. state of Michigan
- Coordinates: 42°40′N 82°55′W
- Country: United States
- State: Michigan
- Founded: January 15, 1818
- Named for: Alexander Macomb
- Seat: Mount Clemens
- Largest city: Warren

Area
  - Total: 571 sq mi (1,480 km^{2})
  - Land: 479 sq mi (1,240 km^{2})
  - Water: 92 sq mi (240 km^{2}) 16%

Population (2020)
  - Total: 881,217
  - Estimate (2025): 886,221 ▲
  - Density: 1,840/sq mi (710/km^{2})
- Time zone: UTC−5 (Eastern)
  - Summer (DST): UTC−4 (EDT)
- Congressional districts: 9th, 10th
- Website: macombgov.org

Macomb County (/məˈkoʊm/ mə-KOHM) is a county on the eastern shore of the U.S. state of Michigan. It is part of the Detroit metropolitan area, bordering Detroit to the south and containing many of its northern suburbs. Its county seat is Mount Clemens, Michigan, and its largest community is Warren. As of the 2020 census, the county had a population of 881,217, making it the third-most populous county in the state, behind neighboring Wayne and Oakland. Macomb County contains 27 cities, townships and villages, including three of the ten most-populous municipalities in Michigan. Most of this population is concentrated south of Hall Road (M-59), one of the county's main thoroughfares.

== History ==
The first European colonists were French, and they arrived in the area during the 17th century. Other early settlers were French fur trappers, who sometimes married Ojibwe women and Jesuit missionaries. A Moravian colony was established in the county in the late 18th century. In addition to the original French and English settlers, later immigrants included Germans, Belgians, and others from Europe. In the 19th century, the county received many European-American migrants from New York and New England, who were attracted to the area for land and booming jobs in the lumber and other resource industries.

Macomb County was formally organized on January 15, 1818, as the third county in the Michigan Territory. The county was named in honor of Detroit-born Alexander Macomb, Jr., a highly decorated veteran of the War of 1812 and hero of the Battle of Plattsburg. He was made Commanding General of the U.S. Army in 1828.

As was typical in development, the county at first encompassed a much larger area than at present. As population increased in the area, the state legislature removed territory in 1819 and 1820 to form the counties of Oakland, Lapeer, Genesee, and St. Clair.

After World War II, Macomb and neighboring Oakland County grew rapidly due to suburbanization - between 1950 and 1960 the county population more than doubled. However, as opposed to the more white-collar Oakland County, Macomb County residents were generally auto workers and other middle-class blue-collar workers.

In May 2008, Macomb County voters approved the inclusion of a County Executive in a new charter to be submitted to the voters by 2010. A charter commission was elected in November 2008 to draft a charter for submission to Governor Granholm, which was submitted and approved and placed on the November 2009 ballot. The Charter passed with a 60.4% to 39.6% margin.

== Geography ==
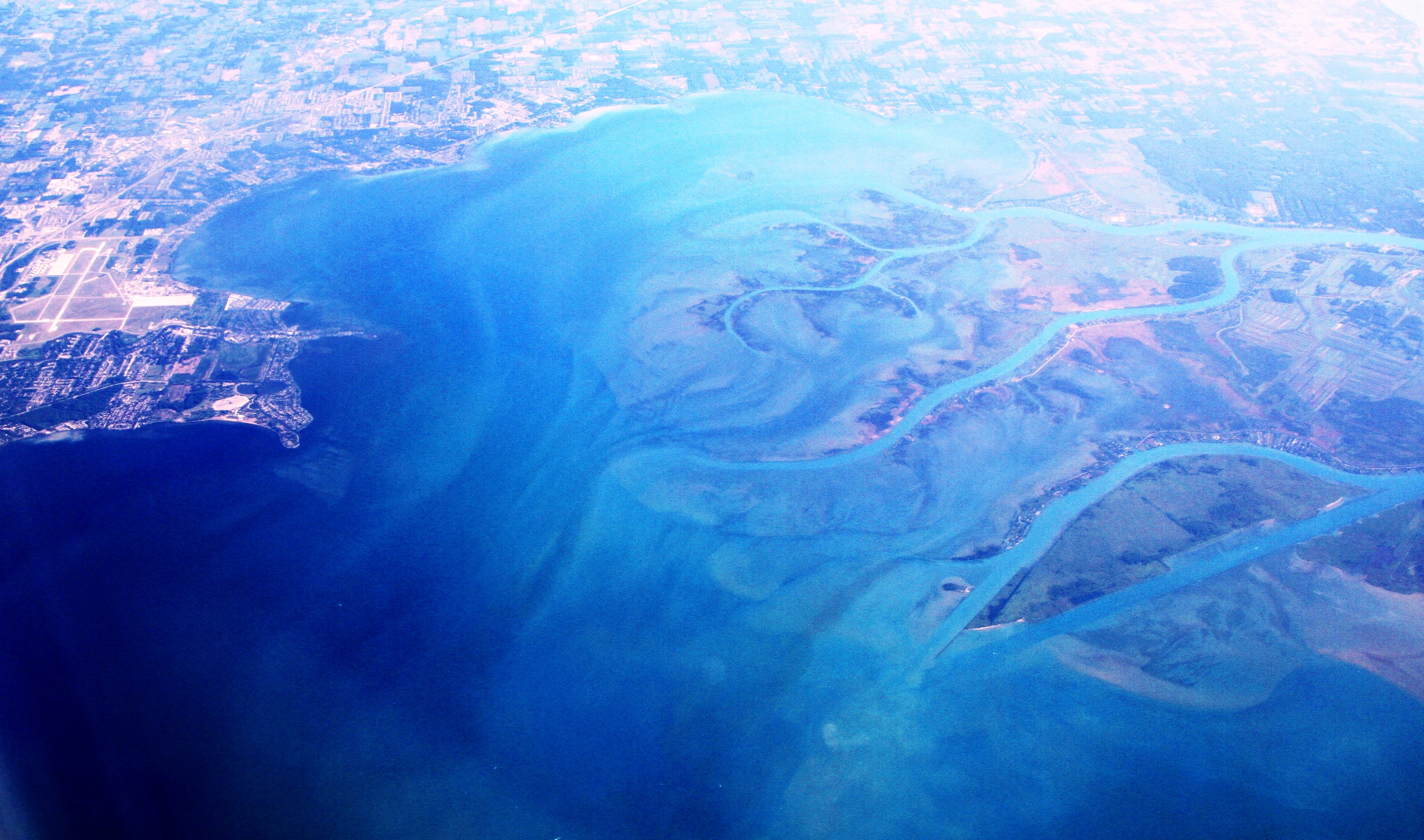
Aerial view of the Anchor Bay from the south towards the north, Macomb County is pictured on the left, with St. Clair County on the right.

According to the U.S. Census Bureau, the county has a total area of 571 square miles (1,480 km^{2}), of which 479 square miles (1,240 km^{2}) is land and 92 square miles (240 km^{2}) (16%) is water. The county's southeastern border with Canada is located across Lake St. Clair.

Lake St. Clair borders the county on the east.

Macomb County is mostly considered a part of Southeast Michigan. However, the far northern parts of the county, including Richmond and Armada, are often considered to be part of Michigan's Thumb region.

The county comprises mostly rural/agricultural communities to the north and a mix of suburban and urban areas to the south.

=== Adjacent counties ===
By land

- St. Clair County, Michigan - northeast
- Lapeer County, Michigan - northwest
- Oakland County, Michigan - west
- Wayne County, Michigan - south

By water

- Lambton County, Ontario, Canada - southeast

== Demographics ==
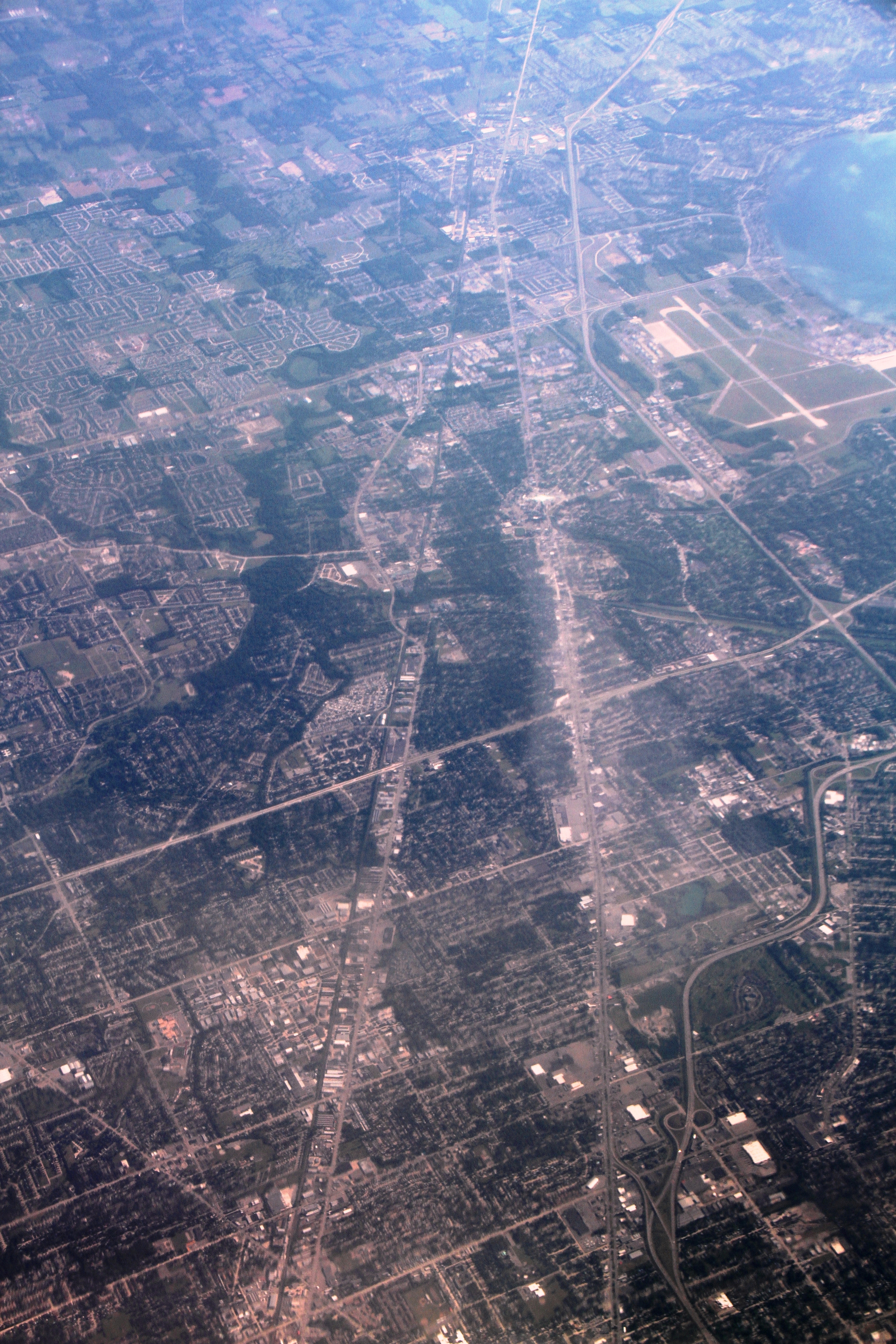
Aerial view from the south toward the north, over Macomb County

Historical population
Census	Pop.	Note	%±
1810	580		—
1820	898		54.8%
1830	2,413		168.7%
1840	9,716		302.7%
1850	15,530		59.8%
1860	22,843		47.1%
1870	27,616		20.9%
1880	31,627		14.5%
1890	31,813		0.6%
1900	33,244		4.5%
1910	32,606		−1.9%
1920	38,103		16.9%
1930	77,146		102.5%
1940	107,638		39.5%
1950	184,961		71.8%
1960	405,804		119.4%
1970	625,309		54.1%
1980	694,600		11.1%
1990	717,400		3.3%
2000	788,149		9.9%
2010	840,978		6.7%
2020	881,217		4.8%
2025 (est.)	886,221	▲	0.6%
U.S. Decennial Census; 1790-1960 1900-1990; 1990-2000 2010-2019

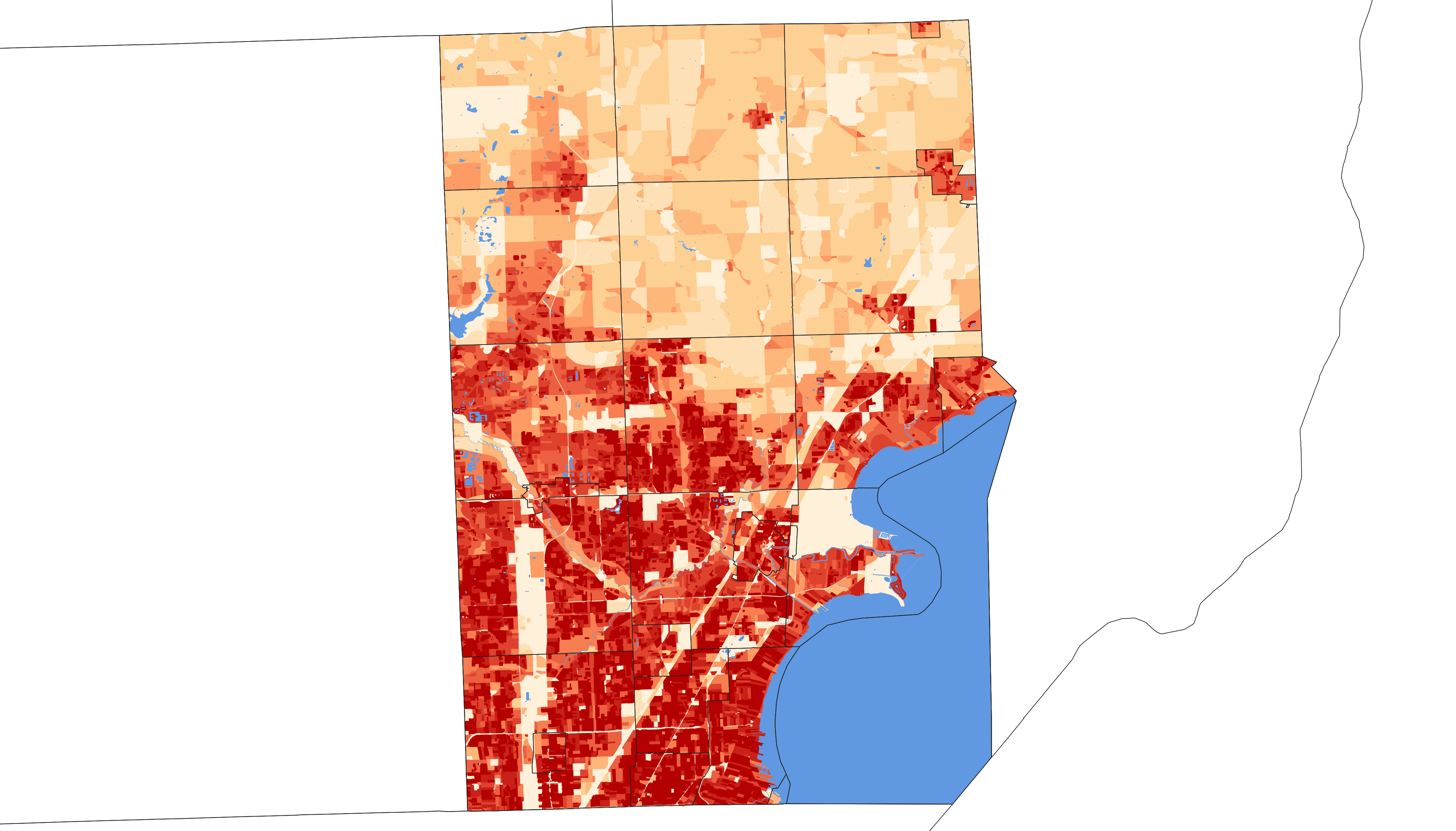
2020 population density of Macomb County MI by census block

=== Racial and ethnic composition ===
Macomb County, Michigan – Racial and ethnic composition Note: the US Census treats Hispanic/Latino as an ethnic category. This table excludes Latinos from the racial categories and assigns them to a separate category. Hispanics/Latinos may be of any race.
Race / Ethnicity (NH = Non-Hispanic)	Pop 1980	Pop 1990	Pop 2000	Pop 2010	Pop 2020	% 1980	% 1990	% 2000	% 2010	% 2020
White alone (NH)	670,091	687,480	721,882	705,693	665,241	96.47%	95.83%	91.59%	83.91%	75.49%
Black or African American alone (NH)	9,061	10,313	21,151	72,053	108,532	1.30%	1.44%	2.68%	8.57%	12.32%
Native American or Alaska Native alone (NH)	1,942	2,529	2,255	2,351	1,766	0.28%	0.35%	0.29%	0.28%	0.20%
Asian alone (NH)	5,616	8,895	16,743	24,908	38,244	0.81%	1.24%	2.12%	2.96%	4.34%
Native Hawaiian or Pacific Islander alone (NH)	x	x	157	168	193	x	x	0.02%	0.02%	0.02%
Other race alone (NH)	1,252	205	685	803	2,939	0.18%	0.03%	0.09%	0.10%	0.33%
Mixed race or Multiracial (NH)	x	x	12,841	15,907	38,088	x	x	1.63%	1.89%	4.32%
Hispanic or Latino (any race)	6,638	7,978	12,435	19,095	26,214	0.96%	1.11%	1.58%	2.27%	2.97%
Total	694,600	717,400	788,149	840,978	881,217	100.00%	100.00%	100.00%	100.00%	100.00%

=== 2020 census ===
As of the 2020 census, the county had a population of 881,217. The median age was 41.5 years. 20.4% of residents were under the age of 18 and 17.7% of residents were 65 years of age or older. For every 100 females there were 95.2 males, and for every 100 females age 18 and over there were 92.9 males age 18 and over.

The racial makeup of the county in 2020 was 76.3% White, 12.4% Black or African American, 0.3% American Indian and Alaska Native, 4.4% Asian, <0.1% Native Hawaiian and Pacific Islander, 1.0% from some other race, and 5.6% from two or more races. Hispanic or Latino residents of any race comprised 3.0% of the population.

The 2020 census also recorded that 96.8% of residents lived in urban areas, while 3.2% lived in rural areas.

There were 353,201 households in the county, of which 28.0% had children under the age of 18 living in them. Of all households, 45.9% were married-couple households, 19.0% were households with a male householder and no spouse or partner present, and 28.7% were households with a female householder and no spouse or partner present. About 29.4% of all households were made up of individuals and 12.5% had someone living alone who was 65 years of age or older.

There were 369,404 housing units, of which 4.4% were vacant. Among occupied housing units, 73.6% were owner-occupied and 26.4% were renter-occupied. The homeowner vacancy rate was 1.1% and the rental vacancy rate was 6.2%.

=== 2010 census ===
As of the 2010 United States census, there were 840,978 people living in the county. 85.4% were White, 8.6% Black or African American, 3.0% Asian, 0.3% Native American, 0.6% of some other race and 2.1% of two or more races. 2.3% were Hispanic or Latino (of any race). 14.8% were of German, 14.3% Polish, 11.1% Italian, 6.5% Irish and 5.9% American ancestry.

=== 2000 census ===
In 2000, 87.6% of county residents spoke only English at home; 1.7% spoke Italian, 1.4% Polish, 1.2% Spanish, 1.1% Arabic, and 1.1% Syriac.

European ethnic groups that have settled in Macomb County since the late 20th century include Bosnians, Albanians and Macedonians.

Among Asian ethnic groups, eight numbered over 1,000 people in Macomb County. They were Arabs, Asian Indians, Chaldo-Assyrians, Filipinos, Chinese, Koreans, Vietnamese, and Hmong. Pakistanis are also represented in Macomb County's population.

Native American tribes had more than 2,478 residents in Macomb County in 2000.

In 2000, there were 309,203 households, out of which 31.10% had children under the age of 18 living with them, 54.30% were married couples living together, 10.10% had a female householder with no husband present, and 31.80% were non-families. 26.90% of all households were made up of individuals, and 10.30% had someone living alone who was 65 years of age or older. The average household size was 2.52 and the average family size was 3.09.

In 2000, the age distribution of the county was as follows: 24.10% under the age of 18, 8.00% from 18 to 24, 31.50% from 25 to 44, 22.80% from 45 to 64, and 13.70% who were 65 years of age or older. The median age was 37 years. For every 100 females, there were 96.00 males. For every 100 females age 18 and over, there were 92.90 males.

The median income for a household in the county was $52,102, and the median income for a family was $62,816. Males had a median income of $48,303 versus $30,215 for females. The per capita income for the county was $24,446. About 4.00% of families and 5.60% of the population were below the poverty line, including 7.00% of those under age 18 and 6.40% of those age 65 or over.

=== 2006 American Community Survey ===
According to the 2006 American Community Survey, the average family size was 3.15. The population of 25 and over was 571,463. 86.9% of that population had graduated from high school, and 21% of the population had a Bachelor's degree or higher. About 14.3% of that population was disabled. 12.5% of Macomb's population could speak another language at home.

Of Michigan's five largest counties, Macomb experienced the most population growth (102.5%) in the post-World War II years of accelerating suburban development, between 1950 and 1960. Its population has continued to grow to the present day, albeit at a slower pace since 1980.

== Parks and recreation ==
Macomb County is home to more than 130 parks covering 12,000 acres (49 km^{2}) managed by the state, regional, county, and local government. There are four major public parks in the County - Freedom Hill County Park, Macomb Orchard Trail, Lake St. Clair Metropark, and Stony Creek Metropark. The county also has 31 miles of shoreline and over 100 marinas.

== Government ==
United States presidential election results for Macomb County, Michigan
Year	Republican		Democratic		Third party(ies)	
Year	No.	%	No.	%	No.	%
1884	2,782	42.98%	3,464	53.51%	227	3.51%
1888	3,245	45.24%	3,708	51.69%	220	3.07%
1892	2,788	41.50%	3,584	53.35%	346	5.15%
1896	4,153	53.22%	3,400	43.57%	250	3.20%
1900	4,239	53.75%	3,491	44.26%	157	1.99%
1904	4,818	60.18%	2,989	37.33%	199	2.49%
1908	4,472	56.78%	3,138	39.84%	266	3.38%
1912	2,508	34.45%	2,829	38.85%	1,944	26.70%
1916	4,552	58.33%	3,108	39.83%	144	1.85%
1920	9,735	73.97%	3,023	22.97%	403	3.06%
1924	11,147	69.96%	3,191	20.03%	1,595	10.01%
1928	12,845	63.28%	7,363	36.27%	91	0.45%
1932	8,649	33.29%	16,539	63.65%	796	3.06%
1936	9,383	32.02%	17,593	60.05%	2,323	7.93%
1940	17,848	45.70%	21,003	53.78%	203	0.52%
1944	21,305	47.20%	23,506	52.08%	324	0.72%
1948	21,205	44.49%	25,265	53.01%	1,190	2.50%
1952	37,474	50.39%	36,544	49.14%	346	0.47%
1956	58,337	48.05%	62,816	51.73%	266	0.22%
1960	61,989	36.86%	105,681	62.83%	525	0.31%
1964	44,684	25.31%	131,450	74.47%	387	0.22%
1968	63,139	30.42%	114,552	55.19%	29,886	14.40%
1972	147,777	62.67%	82,346	34.92%	5,670	2.40%
1976	132,499	51.24%	121,176	46.86%	4,928	1.91%
1980	154,155	51.88%	120,125	40.43%	22,839	7.69%
1984	194,300	66.20%	97,816	33.32%	1,409	0.48%
1988	175,632	60.33%	112,856	38.77%	2,627	0.90%
1992	147,795	42.32%	130,732	37.43%	70,711	20.25%
1996	120,616	39.41%	151,430	49.48%	33,982	11.10%
2000	164,265	47.54%	172,625	49.96%	8,669	2.51%
2004	202,166	50.24%	196,160	48.75%	4,084	1.01%
2008	187,663	44.66%	223,784	53.26%	8,729	2.08%
2012	191,913	47.33%	208,016	51.30%	5,586	1.38%
2016	224,665	53.58%	176,317	42.05%	18,330	4.37%
2020	263,863	53.39%	223,952	45.31%	6,441	1.30%
2024	284,660	55.91%	214,977	42.22%	9,515	1.87%

United States Senate election results for Macomb County, Michigan1
Year	Republican		Democratic		Third party(ies)	
Year	No.	%	No.	%	No.	%
2024	265,883	53.31%	217,665	43.64%	15,176	3.04%

Michigan Gubernatorial election results for Macomb County
Year	Republican		Democratic		Third party(ies)	
Year	No.	%	No.	%	No.	%
2022	179,258	46.62%	199,277	51.82%	6,009	1.56%

The county government operates the jail, maintains rural roads, operates the major local courts, keeps files of deeds and mortgages, maintains vital records, administers public health regulations, and participates with the state in the provision of welfare and other social services. The county board of commissioners controls the budget and creates and adopts ordinances and resolutions related to County functions. In Michigan, most local government functions — police and fire, building and zoning, tax assessment, street maintenance, etc. — are the responsibility of individual cities and townships.

The Macomb Intermediate School District serves all school districts based in the county.

=== Elected officials ===
- County Executive: Mark Hackel (Democrat)
- Prosecuting Attorney: Peter Lucido (Republican)
- Sheriff: Anthony Wickersham (Democrat)
- County Clerk/Register of Deeds: Anthony Forlini (Republican)
- County Treasurer: Larry Rocca (Republican)
- Public Works Commissioner: Candice Miller (Republican)
- Macomb County Board of Commissioners: 13 members, elected from districts (5 Democrats, 8 Republicans)
- Circuit Court: 13 judges (non-partisan)
- Probate Court: 2 judges (non-partisan)

=== Politics ===
Macomb County has historically shown Republican tendencies in statewide elections, while tending to favor Democratic candidates at the federal and local level. Since the 2010s, Macomb County has shifted towards the Republicans, and, following the 2020 elections, the party gained control of the Board of Commissioners for the first time as well as four of the five countywide offices up for election.

The county gained fame in the 1980s and 1990s as a bellwether of state and national politics. Macomb's large cohort of middle-class, socially conservative White voters gave it one of the nation's most prominent concentrations of "Reagan Democrats". Outsider candidates with a conservative-populist inclination have done well there in the past, such as Pat Buchanan in 1992 and Donald Trump in 2016, 2020, and 2024. Macomb County voters were primarily responsible for the failure of the 2016 Regional Transit Authority proposal to create a comprehensive public transit system in the Metropolitan Detroit region.

The more populated communities south of M-59 (Warren, Sterling Heights, Clinton Charter Township, Mount Clemens), closer to Detroit city proper are friendlier to Democrats. Warren and Mount Clemens lean Democratic, while Sterling Heights, after voting for Barack Obama in 2012, voted for Trump by about 12 points in both 2016 and 2020, but in 2018, voted for Gretchen Whitmer and Debbie Stabenow by 3 points, and Clinton Charter Township after voting for Obama in 2012, voted for Trump in 2016, but swung back to Whitmer and Stabenow in 2018 and Joe Biden in 2020. The communities north of M-59 further removed from Detroit are more strongly Republican, all backing Trump in 2016 and 2020 and Bill Schuette in 2018.

== Transportation ==
=== Air ===
- Coleman A. Young International Airport (DET) (Detroit) - General aviation only
- Detroit Metropolitan Wayne County Airport (DTW) (Romulus) - Major commercial airport, a hub for Delta Air Lines
- Oakland County International Airport (PTK) Waterford Township) - Charter passenger facility
- St. Clair County International Airport (near Port Huron, Michigan) - A minor international airport on the Canada–US border.
- Selfridge Air National Guard Base (Mount Clemens) - Military airbase
- Romeo State Airport (2 miles east of Romeo, Michigan) - Small general aviation airport within Macomb County
- Ray Community Airport (2 miles southeast of Ray, Michigan) - Small general aviation airport within Macomb County
- Marine City Airport (4 miles west of Marine City, Michigan) - Small general aviation airport in neighboring Saint Clair County
- Oakland/Troy Airport (2 miles east of Troy, Michigan) - Small general aviation airport in neighboring Oakland County

=== Major highways ===
- I-94 (Edsel Ford Freeway) runs –west through Detroit and serves Ann Arbor to the west (where it continues to Chicago) and Port Huron to the northeast. The stretch of the current I-94 freeway from Ypsilanti to Detroit was one of the first American limited-access freeways. Henry Ford built it to link his factories at Willow Run and Dearborn during World War II. It was called the Willow Run Expressway.
- I-696 (Walter Reuther Freeway) runs east–west from the junction of I-96, I-275, and M-5 to I-94, providing a route through the northern suburbs of Detroit.
- M-3 (Gratiot Avenue) is a major road that runs from Marysville to downtown Detroit. The portion of the road between 23 Mile Road and New Haven Road is not numbered. Between New Haven Road and Main Street in the city of Richmond, the road is part of M-19. Between Richmond and Marysville the road is not numbered.
- M-19 starts in New Haven goes up Gratiot to Richmond. The route leaves Gratiot and goes northwest through Richmond and then north through Memphis. Then it goes north through St. Clair and Sanilac Counties and ends at M-142 near Bad Axe in Huron County.
- M-29 begins as part of 23 Mile Road, east of I-94, and ends in Marysville.
- M-53 which is called the Van Dyke Freeway and Christopher Columbus Freeway from 18 Mile Road in Sterling Heights to 27 1/2 Mile Road in Washington Township. It is also called the POW/MIA Memorial Freeway from 27 1/2 Mile Road in Washington Township to the freeway's end at 34 Mile Road in Bruce Township, however, it is locally known as the Van Dyke Freeway. It continues as Van Dyke Road or Van Dyke Avenue north to Port Austin and south through Warren to Gratiot Avenue in Detroit.
- M-59 (Veterans Memorial Freeway) from Utica to Pontiac, continues east as Hall Road to Gratiot Avenue and as William P. Rosso Highway to its terminus at I-94 and west as various surface roads to I-96 near Howell
- M-97 (Groesbeck Highway) begins in Detroit at Gratiot (M-3) and ends at Hall Road (M-59).
- M-102 (8 Mile Road), known by many due to the film 8 Mile, forms the dividing line between Detroit on the south and the suburbs of Macomb and Oakland counties on the north. It is also known as Baseline Road outside of Detroit, because it coincides with the baseline used in surveying Michigan; that baseline is also the boundary for many Michigan counties.

=== Other roads ===
- Jefferson Avenue is a scenic highway that runs parallel to the shore of the Detroit River and Lake St. Clair. It is also the principal thoroughfare for the Grosse Pointes, where it is called Lake Shore Drive.
- Mound Road is a north-south divided highway running from a junction with Mount Elliott Street in Detroit to Auburn Road north of M-59 in Shelby Township. It runs parallel to M-53/Van Dyke Road one mile to the west. Its massive stack interchange with I-696 is a remnant of a cancelled freeway upgrade that would've connected with a proposed extension of the Davison Freeway on the south end and the M-53 freeway via a connector along the 18 1/2 Mile Road corridor on the north end.
- "Mile" roads: Surface street navigation in Metro Detroit is commonly anchored by "mile roads," major east–west surface streets that are spaced at one-mile intervals and increment as one travels north and away from the city center. Mile roads sometimes have two names, the numeric name (ex. 15 Mile Road) used in Macomb County and a local name (ex. Maple Road) used in Oakland County mostly.

=== Rail ===
Into the end of the 1950s the New York Central Railroad operated multiple trains from Mackinaw City at the north end of Michigan's Lower Peninsula, with stops at Warren station. The last Bay City to Detroit passenger train through Warren stopped on March 19, 1964.

== Communities ==
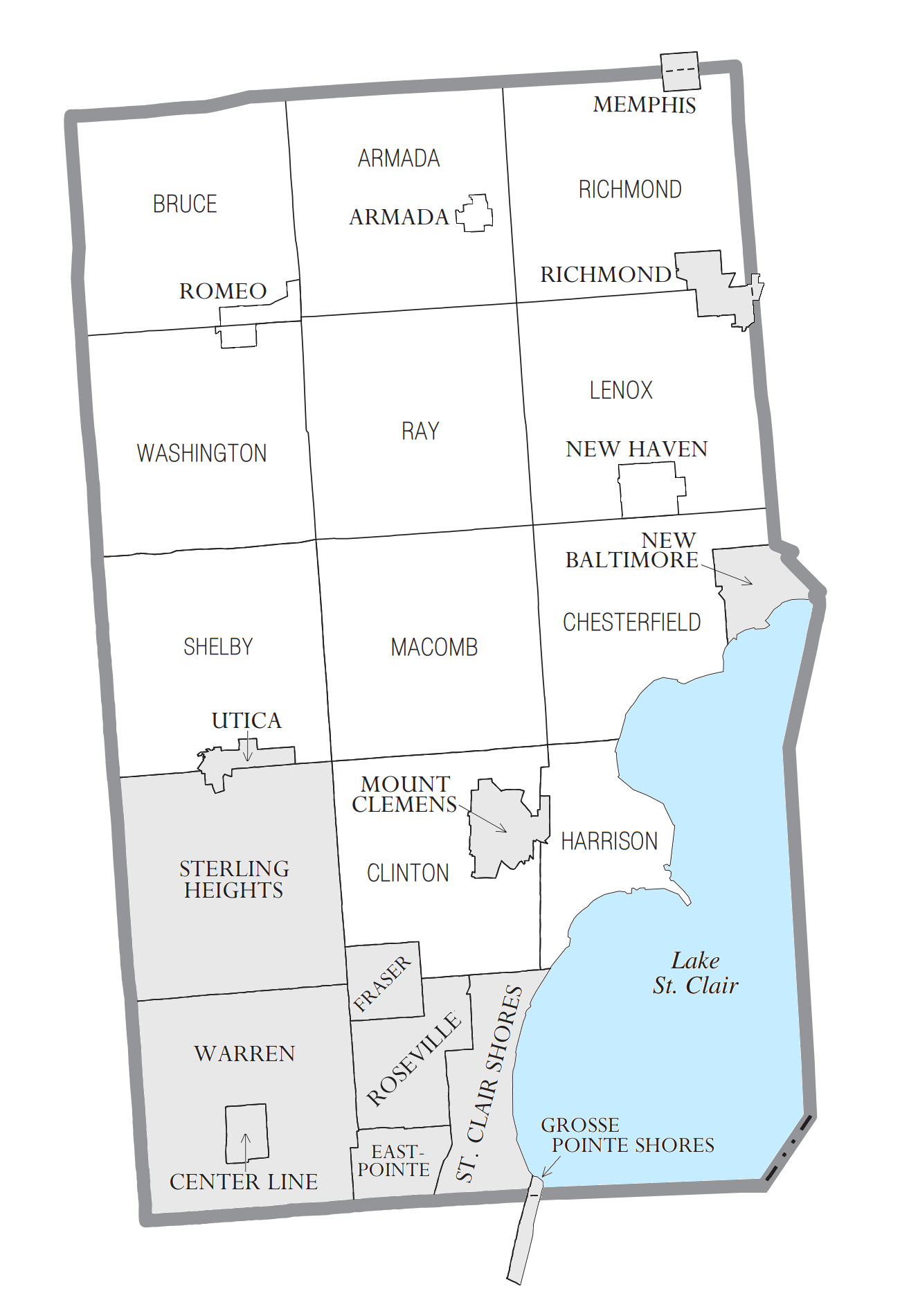
U.S. census data map showing local municipal boundaries within Macomb County. Shaded areas represent incorporated cities.

=== Cities ===
- Center Line
- Eastpointe (formerly East Detroit)
- Fraser
- Grosse Pointe Shores (partial)
- Memphis (partial)
- Mount Clemens, Michigan (county seat)
- New Baltimore
- Richmond (partial)
- Roseville
- St. Clair Shores
- Sterling Heights
- Utica
- Warren

=== Villages ===
- Armada
- New Haven
- Romeo

=== Charter townships ===
- Chesterfield Charter Township
- Clinton Charter Township
- Harrison Charter Township
- Shelby Charter Township
- Washington Charter Township

=== Civil townships ===
- Armada Township
- Bruce Township
- Lenox Township
- Macomb Township
- Ray Township
- Richmond Township

==== Former civil townships ====
- Erin Township
- Lake Township
- Sterling Township
- Warren Township

=== Unincorporated communities ===
- Anchor Bay Gardens
- Anchor Bay Harbor
- Anchor Bay Shores
- Broad Acres
- Cady
- Chesterfield
- Chesterfield Shores
- Clifton Mill
- Davis
- Lakeside
- Lottivue
- Macomb
- Meade
- Milton
- Mount Vernon
- Point Lakeview
- Preston Corners
- Ray Center
- Saint Clair Haven
- Sebille Manor
- Shelby
- Waldenburg
- Washington
- Wolcott Mills
- Yates

== Education ==
School districts:

- Almont Community Schools
- Anchor Bay School District
- Armada Area Schools
- Center Line Public Schools
- Chippewa Valley Schools
- Clintondale Community Schools
- Eastpointe Community Schools
- Fitzgerald Public Schools
- Fraser Public Schools
- Lakeview Public Schools
- Lake Shore Public Schools
- L'Anse Creuse Public Schools
- Memphis Community Schools
- Mount Clemens Community School District
- New Haven Community Schools
- Oxford Area Community Schools
- Richmond Community Schools
- Rochester Community School District
- Romeo Community Schools
- Roseville Community Schools
- South Lake Schools
- Utica Community Schools
- Van Dyke Public Schools
- Warren Consolidated Schools
- Warren Woods Public Schools

== Notable people ==
=== Actors and actresses ===
- Dean Cain, actor, Mount Clemens
- Dave Coulier, actor/comedian, St. Clair Shores
- Adrienne Frantz, actress and singer, Mount Clemens, Michigan
- Faye Grant, actress, St. Clair Shores
- Kathleen Rose Perkins, actress, New Baltimore
- Crystal Reed, actress, Roseville, Michigan

=== Athletes ===
- George Herbert Allen, coached in the NFL and USFL, St. Clair Shores
- David Booth, NHL player, Washington Township
- Kyle Connor, NHL player for the Winnipeg Jets
- Dave Debol, NHL player, St. Clair Shores
- Danny DeKeyser, NHL Player, Macomb County
- Joe DeLamielleure, NFL Player, Center Line
- John DiGiorgio, NFL Player, Macomb, Shelby Township
- Sheldon Dries, NHL player, Macomb Twp.
- Denny Felsner, NHL player, Warren
- Derian Hatcher, NHL player, Sterling Heights
- Kevin Hatcher, NHL player, Sterling Heights
- Pat Hentgen, MLB player, Fraser
- Bryan Herta, race car driver, Warren
- Matt Hunwick, NHL player, Warren
- Ron Kramer, NFL player, Eastpointe
- Craig Krenzel, NFL player, Sterling Heights
- Chad LaRose, NHL player, Fraser
- John Mazza, PBA bowler, Shelby Township
- Shirley Muldowney, race car driver, Armada
- John Smoltz, MLB player, Warren
- Jim Sorgi, NFL player, Fraser
- Matt Taormina, NHL player, Warren
- Michele Van Gorp, WNBA player from Duke University, Warren
- Doug Weight, NHL player, Warren
- Mark Wells, member of the 1980 Olympic hockey team, St. Clair Shores
- Johnny White, race car driver, Warren
- Ernie Whitt, MLB player, Roseville
- Frank Zombo, NFL player, Sterling Heights
- Kyle Cook, NFL player, Macomb Twp.
- Steve Oleksy, NHL player, Chesterfield Twp.
- Tyler Conklin, NFL player, Chesterfield Twp.
- Sean Murphy-Bunting, NFL Player, Macomb Twp.

=== Musicians ===
- Kid Rock, Romeo
- Mitch Ryder, Roseville
- Justin Jeffre, (98 Degrees), Mount Clemens
- Uncle Kracker, Harrison Township
- Eminem, Warren
- Fred 'Sonic' Smith, St. Clair Shores
- Alice Cooper, Eastpointe
- Chuck Inglish, Mount Clemens, Michigan

=== Other ===
- Joe Cada, professional poker player, Shelby Charter Township
- Dick Enberg, sportscaster, Armada
- Martha Griffiths, Lieutenant Governor of Michigan (1983–1991), Armada
- Alex Groesbeck, politician, Warren
- Butch Hartman, creator of the cartoon show The Fairly OddParents, New Baltimore
- Ian Hornak, Artist, Mount Clemens
- George F. Lewis, proprietor of newspapers
- Jerry M. Linenger, NASA astronaut, Eastpointe
- Howard Wiest, Chief Justice of the Michigan Supreme Court, Washington Township

== See also ==
- List of Michigan State Historic Sites in Macomb County
- National Register of Historic Places listings in Macomb County, Michigan
