= List of museums in Michigan =

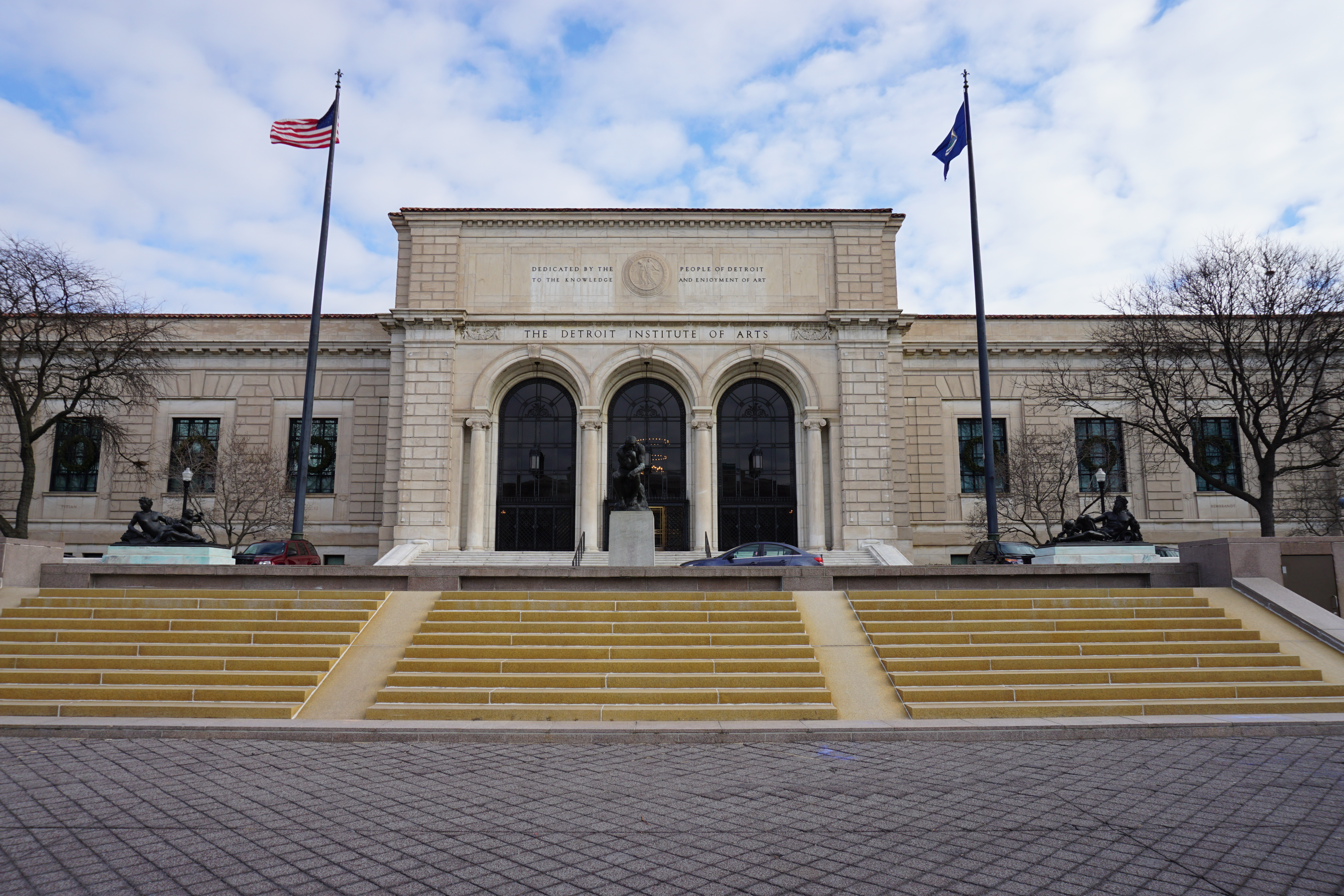
Detroit Institute of Arts

This list of museums in Michigan encompasses museums which are defined for this context as institutions (including nonprofit organizations, government entities, and private businesses) that collect and care for objects of cultural, artistic, scientific, or historical interest and make their collections or related exhibits available for public viewing. Museums that exist only in cyberspace (i.e., virtual museums) are not included.

== Active museums ==
| Name | Location | County | Region | Type | Summary |
|---|---|---|---|---|---|
| A. E. Seaman Mineral Museum | Houghton | Houghton | Upper Peninsula of Michigan | Geology | Located on the campus of Michigan Technological University, participating institution in Keweenaw National Historical Park, state minerals |
| Adventure Mine | Greenland Township | Ontonagon | Upper Peninsula of Michigan | Mining | Underground tours of a preserved copper mine |
| Air Zoo | Portage | Kalamazoo | West Michigan | Aerospace | Formerly the Kalamazoo Aviation History Museum, part aviation museum and part amusement park, includes Michigan Space Science Center, simulators, historic airplanes, aviation exhibits, Michigan Aviation Hall of Fame |
| Alberta Village Museum | Alberta | Baraga | Upper Peninsula of Michigan | Open-air | website, Ford's sawmill village & logging industry |
| Albert L. Lorenzo Cultural Center | Clinton Township | Macomb | Southeast Michigan | Multiple | website, changing exhibits of art, science, culture and history, formerly Macomb Cultural Center, part of Macomb Community College |
| Alden B. Dow Home & Studio | Midland | Midland | Flint/Tri-Cities | Historic house | Private residence of noted 20th-century architect Alden B. Dow |
| Alden B. Dow Museum of Science & Art | Midland | Midland | Flint/Tri-Cities | Multiple | Science gallery and gallery space featuring changing visual art and science exhibitions; part of the Midland Center for the Arts |
| Alden Depot Park and Museum | Alden | Antrim | Northern Michigan | Local history | Operated by the Helena Township Historical Society |
| Alger County Heritage Center | Munising | Alger | Upper Peninsula of Michigan | Local history | Includes American Fur Company log cabin furnished for the 1830s |
| Algonac Clay Historical Society Museum | Algonac | St. Clair | Southeast Michigan | Local history | website, exhibits on local cultural and maritime history, also operates the Clay Township Log Cabin |
| Allegan Old Jail Museum | Allegan | Allegan | West Michigan | Historic house | Operated by the Allegan County Historical Society, jail and Victorian sheriff's house |
| Allen House Museum | Bad Axe | Huron | Flint/Tri-Cities | Historic house | website, operated by the Bad Axe Historical Society, 1902 Dutch colonial home |
| All Around the African World Museum | Lansing | Ingham | Central Michigan | African American | |
| Allen Park Historical Museum | Allen Park | Wayne | Southeast Michigan | Local history | website |
| Alpine Township Historical Museum | Alpine Township | Kent | West Michigan | Local history | Operated by the Alpine Township Historical Commission, 1860 former town hall |
| Amasa Historical Society Museum | Amasa | Iron | Upper Peninsula of Michigan | Local history | |
| American Museum of Magic | Marshall | Calhoun | Central Michigan | Magic | Magical paraphernalia and illusions, including devices that once belonged to magician Harry Blackstone, Sr. |
| Andrew J. Blackbird Museum | Harbor Springs | Emmet | Northern Michigan | Native American | Native American artifacts |
| Ann Arbor Hands-On Museum | Ann Arbor | Washtenaw | Southeast Michigan | Science | |
| Antique Toy & Firehouse Museum | Bay City | Bay | Flint/Tri-Cities | Toy | website, over 60 motorized fire trucks, over 12,000 antique and collectible toys, particularly fire, police and rescue vehicles |
| Anton Art Center | Mount Clemens | Macomb | Southeast Michigan | Art | Community art center, exhibitions of local, national and international artists |
| Arab American National Museum | Dearborn | Wayne | Southeast Michigan | Ethnic | Arab civilization, Arab experience in America |
| Arcadia Historical Museum | Arcadia | Manistee | Northern Michigan | Local history | website |
| Arenac County Historical Museum | Au Gres | Arenac | Northern Michigan | Local history | website, operated by the Arenac County Historical Society |
| Argus Museum | Ann Arbor | Washtenaw | Southeast Michigan | Photography | Products manufactured by the Argus camera company |
| Art Center of Battle Creek | Battle Creek | Calhoun | West Michigan | Art | website, hosts 10-12 varied shows each year, including annual Michigan Artist Competition exhibition |
| Astor House Museum | Copper Harbor | Keweenaw | Upper Peninsula of Michigan | Local history | website, antique dolls, toys, American Indian artifacts, mining and fishing artifacts |
| Au Sable Light Station | Grand Marais | Alger | Upper Peninsula of Michigan | Lighthouse | Located in Pictured Rocks National Lakeshore, operated by the National Park Service |
| Au Sable-Oscoda Historical Museum | Oscoda | Iosco | Northern Michigan | Local history | website |
| Automotive Hall of Fame | Dearborn | Wayne | Southeast Michigan | Hall of fame | Notable figures in the development of the automobile industry |
| Averill Historical Museum of Ada | Ada | Kent | West Michigan | Local history | website, operated by the Ada Historical Society |
| Bammert Blacksmith Shop | Eagle Harbor Township | Keweenaw | Upper Peninsula of Michigan | Technology | website, tools & equipment, operated by the Keweenaw County Historical Society; participating institution in Keweenaw National Historical Park |
| Baraga County Historical Museum | Baraga | Baraga | Upper Peninsula of Michigan | Local history | website, operated by the Baraga County Historical Society |
| Barryton Area Museum | Barryton | Mecosta | West Michigan | Local history | One room schoolhouse and local history museum |
| Bay County Historical Museum | Bay City | Bay | Flint/Tri-Cities | Local history | website |
| Beaumier Upper Peninsula Heritage Center | Marquette | Marquette | Upper Peninsula of Michigan | Local history | website, located in 105 Cohodas Hall at Northern Michigan University, history and culture of the Upper Peninsula |
| Beaver Island Historical Society Museums | St. James | Charlevoix | Northern Michigan | Multiple | website, includes Old Mormon Print Shop Museum of local history, the Maritime Museum about fishing on the island, and Protar Home, a historic log cabin |
| Bellaire Historical Museum | Bellaire | Antrim | Northern Michigan | Local history | Operated by the Bellaire Area Historical Society in the lower level of the Bellaire Community Hall |
| Belleville Area Museum | Belleville | Wayne | Southeast Michigan | Local history | website |
| Benzie Area Historical Museum | Benzonia | Benzie | Northern Michigan | Local history | website |
| Bergland/Matchwood Historical Society Museum | Bergland | Ontonagon | Upper Peninsula of Michigan | Local history | website |
| Berkley Historical Museum | Berkley | Oakland | Southeast Michigan | Local history | website, located in the old Fire Hall at City Hall |
| Bernard Historical Museum | Delton | Barry | West Michigan | Open-air | website, operated by the Bernard Historical Society, includes Bernard Hospital, Brown School, Country Store, Seamstress Cottage, Little House, Blacksmith Shop, Implement Building, Windmill |
| Bessemer Historical Society Museum | Bessemer | Gogebic | Upper Peninsula of Michigan | Local history | website |
| Besser Museum for Northeast Michigan | Alpena | Alpena | Northern Michigan | Multiple | website, art, science, natural history, history, planetarium; also known as Jesse Besser Museum. Contains Fishing Tug Katherine V, last extant wooden Great Lakes fishing tug. The Besser Museum Sky Theater |
| Big Sable Point Light | Ludington | Mason | Northern Michigan | Lighthouse | Operated by the Sable Points Lighthouse Keepers Association |
| Birmingham Bloomfield Art Center | Birmingham | Oakland | Southeast Michigan | Art | website, regional art center, four galleries showcase contemporary art from the Midwest and beyond |
| Birmingham Historical Museum & Park | Birmingham | Oakland | Southeast Michigan | Historic house | website, features the 1822 John West Hunter House, decorated for the period 1820–1880, and the 1928 Allen House with exhibits on local history |
| Blanchard House | Ionia | Ionia | Central Michigan | Historic house | website, 1880s Italianate mansion, owned and operated by the Ionia County Historical Society, includes a museum of local Ionia history |
| Bottle-Cap Museum | Grayling | Crawford | Northern Michigan | Ephemera | website, Coca-Cola memorabilia inside Dawson and Stevens Classic 50's Diner |
| Bowne Township Historical Museum | Bowne Township | Kent | West Michigan | Local history | website, operated by the Bowne Twp. Historical Commission, also Bowne Center School |
| Boyne City Historical Museum | Boyne City | Charlevoix | Northern Michigan | Local history | |
| Brethren Heritage Museum | Manistee | Manistee | Northern Michigan | Local history | Open by appointment with the Brethren Heritage Association |
| Bunert One-Room School House Museum | Warren | Macomb | Southeast Michigan | School | Operated by the Warren Historical Society, late 19th-century one-room school |
| Byron Area Historic Museum | Byron Center | Kent | West Michigan | Local history | |
| Caledonia Historical Museum | Caledonia | Kent | West Michigan | Local history | website, operated by the Caledonia Historical Society |
| Call of the Wild & Bavarian Falls Park | Gaylord | Otsego | Northern Michigan | Natural history | website, museum with mounted animal displays, hands-on learning center and family amusement park |
| Cannery Boathouse Museum | Glen Haven | Leelanau | Northern Michigan | Maritime | Part of Sleeping Bear Dunes National Lakeshore, exhibit of Great Lakes small craft |
| Cannon Historical Museum | Cannon | Kent | West Michigan | Local history | Operated by the Cannon Township Historical Society |
| Canton Historical Society and Museum | Canton | Wayne | Southeast Michigan | History | Local history, housed in a historic one room schoolhouse |
| Capac Historical Society Museum | Capac | St. Clair | Southeast Michigan | Local history | website, collections include the Kempf Model City (a mechanical city, 40 feet (12 m) long and 4 feet (1.2 m) wide), also G.T. RR Caboose |
| Capitol Hill School | Marshall | Calhoun | West Michigan | School | website, operated by the Marshall Historical Society, 19th-century schoolhouse, toy displays, open by appointment |
| Cappon House & Settlers House Museums | Holland | Ottawa | West Michigan | Historic house | Operated by the Holland Museum, 19th-century Victorian home of Holland's first mayor and a restored Dutch settler's home |
| Card Wildlife Education Center | Big Rapids | Mecosta | Northern Michigan | Natural history | website, part of Ferris State University, wildlife dioramas |
| Carl T. Johnson Hunting And Fishing Center | Cadillac | Wexford | Northern Michigan | Natural history | Wildlife dioramas, history of hunting and fishing in Michigan |
| Carnegie Center -- Port Huron Museum | Port Huron | St. Clair | Southeast Michigan | Local history | History, pre-history and culture of the Blue Water area, includes maritime exhibits, musical instrument collection, art, log cabin |
| Carnegie Center for the Arts | Three Rivers | St. Joseph | West Michigan | Art | website, also W.R. Monroe Museum is adjacent, changing exhibits of arts, nature, science and history |
| Carnegie Museum of the Keweenaw | Houghton | Houghton | Upper Peninsula of Michigan | Multiple | Rotating exhibits about local history, natural history, science and culture |
| Caseville Historical Society Museum | Caseville | Huron | Flint/Tri-Cities | Local history | website |
| Castle Farms | Charlevoix | Charlevoix | Northern Michigan | Historic house | 1918 castle-style house and gardens, open for tours |
| Castle Museum of Saginaw County History | Saginaw | Saginaw | Flint/Tri-Cities | Local history | Operated by the Historical Society of Saginaw County |
| Catholic Heritage Museum | Saginaw | Saginaw | Flint/Tri-Cities | Religious | Artifacts of the churches of the Saginaw Catholic Diocese |
| Cedar Springs Museum | Cedar Springs | Kent | West Michigan | Local history | website, operated by the Cedar Springs Historical Society in the 19th-century one-room Payne School |
| Celery Flats Interpretive Center | Portage | Kalamazoo | West Michigan | Agriculture | Celery cultivation and Dutch immigration, located in Portage Creek Bicentennial Park |
| Cell Block 7 Prison Museum | Jackson | Jackson | Central Michigan | Prison | Prison exhibit within the walls of an operating penitentiary |
| Central Mine and Village | Eagle Harbor Township | Keweenaw | Upper Peninsula of Michigan | Open-air | Historic mining village, operated by the Keweenaw County Historical Society; participating institution in Keweenaw National Historical Park |
| Charles H. Wright Museum of African American History | Detroit | Wayne | Southeast Michigan | African American | African American cultural history and important figures |
| Charlton Park Historic Village and Museum | Hastings | Barry | West Michigan | Open-air | Recreated typical late 19th- to early 20th-century village |
| Chassell Heritage Center | Chassell | Houghton | Upper Peninsula of Michigan | Local history | Participating institution in Keweenaw National Historical Park |
| Cheboygan History Center | Cheboygan | Cheboygan | Northern Michigan | Multiple | website, operated by the History Center of Cheboygan County, includes log cabin, 1882 sheriff residence with attached jail cells, jail addition built in 1912–14, Spies Heritage Hall with local history exhibits |
| Chelsea Historical Museum | Chelsea | Washtenaw | Southeast Michigan | Local history | website, operated by the Chelsea Area Historical Society |
| Chesaning Area Historical Museum | Chesaning | Saginaw | Flint/Tri-Cities | Local history | website, operated by the Chesaning Area Historical Society |
| Chippewa Nature Center | Midland | Midland | Flint/Tri-Cities | Nature center | Visitor center with natural history and Native American exhibits, Homestead Farm and Log Schoolhouse, wigwam, arboretum, trails |
| Civilian Conservation Corps Museum | Roscommon | Crawford | Northern Michigan | History | Located in North Higgins Lake State Park and interpreted in cooperation with the Michigan Department of Natural Resources |
| Clarkston Heritage Museum | Clarkston | Oakland | Southeast Michigan | Local history | website, operated by the Clarkston Community Historical Society |
| Clawson Historical Museum | Clawson | Oakland | Southeast Michigan | Local history | website |
| Cliffs Shaft Mine Museum | Ishpeming | Marquette | Upper Peninsula of Michigan | Industry - Mining | Mining artifacts, minerals, exhibits |
| Clinton Township Historical Village Museum | Clinton Charter Township | Macomb | Southeast Michigan | Open-air | website |
| Cobblestone Farm and Museum | Ann Arbor | Washtenaw | Southeast Michigan | Historic house | Mid 19th-century period farm and house |
| Coe House Museum | Grass Lake | Jackson | Central Michigan | Historic house | 19th-century Victorian house, operated by the Grass Lake Historical Society |
| Colonial Michilimackinac | Mackinaw City | Emmet | Northern Michigan | Living | Fortified fur-trading village as it appeared in the 1770s |
| Conklin Antique Reed Organ Museum | Hanover | Jackson | Central Michigan | Multiple | website, operated by the Hanover-Horton Area Historical Society, local history, antique reed organ collection |
| Coopersville Farm Museum | Coopersville | Ottawa | West Michigan | Agriculture | website, farming, agriculture and rural living |
| Coopersville Area Historical Society & Museum | Coopersville | Ottawa | West Michigan | Local history | |
| Copper Harbor Lighthouse | Copper Harbor | Keweenaw | Upper Peninsula of Michigan | Lighthouse | Lighthouse and maritime museum located within Fort Wilkins Historic State Park |
| Copper Range Historical Museum | South Range | Houghton | Upper Peninsula of Michigan | Local history | Operated by the Copper Range Historical Society, participating institution in Keweenaw National Historical Park |
| Coppertown USA Mining Museum | Calumet | Houghton | Upper Peninsula of Michigan | Industry - Mining | website, copper mining and the Calumet & Hecla Mining Company, participating institution in Keweenaw National Historical Park |
| Cornish Pump Engine & Mining Museum | Iron Mountain | Dickinson | Upper Peninsula of Michigan | Industry - Mining | Largest steam-driven pumping engine built in the US, operated by the Menominee Range Historical Foundation |
| Corunna Historical Village | Corunna | Shiawassee | Central Michigan | Open-air | website, operated by the Corunna Historical Commission, open only four times a year |
| Cranbrook Art Museum | Bloomfield Hills | Oakland | Southeast Michigan | Art | Contemporary art, part of the Cranbrook Academy of Art |
| Cranbrook House and Gardens | Bloomfield Hills | Oakland | Southeast Michigan | Historic house | 1908 English Arts and Crafts-style mansion and 40 acres (160,000 m^{2}) of gardens |
| Cranbrook Institute of Science | Bloomfield Hills | Oakland | Southeast Michigan | Natural history | Natural history, science, planetarium, nature center |
| Crawford County Historical Museum | Grayling | Crawford | Northern Michigan | Local history | website, operated by the Crawford County Historical Society in an 1882 depot |
| Crisp Point Light | Paradise | Luce | Upper Peninsula of Michigan | Lighthouse | Operated by the Crisp Point Light Historical Society |
| Crocker House Museum | Mount Clemens | Macomb | Southeast Michigan | Local history | website, operated by the Macomb County Historical Society, late Victorian home-life experience |
| Crooked Tree Arts Center | Petoskey | Emmet | Northern Michigan | Art | website, visual and performing arts center |
| Cross in the Woods & Nun Doll Museum | Indian River | Cheboygan | Northern Michigan | Religious | Catholic shrine with museum of dolls dressed in various nun's habits |
| Crossroads Village | Flint | Genesee | Flint/Tri-Cities | Living | website, over 35 buildings showing late 19th-century small village life, operated by the Genesee County Parks and Recreation Commission; site of Huckleberry Railroad |
| Curious Kids' Museum | St. Joseph | Berrien | West Michigan | Children's | website |
| Curwood Castle | Owosso | Shiawassee | Central Michigan | Historic house | Home of novelist and conservationist James Oliver Curwood |
| Davis Brothers Farm Shop Museum | Oregon Township | Lapeer | Flint/Tri-Cities | Agriculture | website, operated by the Lapeer County Historical Society, farm equipment, exhibits and demonstrations |
| Davison Area Historical Museum | Davison | Genesee | Flint/Tri-Cities | Local history | website, operated by the Davison Area Historical Society |
| Dearborn Historical Museum | Dearborn | Wayne | Southeast Michigan | Historic houses | Includes Commandant's Quarters and McFadden-Ross House |
| Deckerville Historical Museum | Deckerville | Sanilac | Flint/Tri-Cities | Local history | |
| Dee Stadium Hockey History Museum | Houghton | Houghton | Upper Peninsula of Michigan | Sports | History of the site and area ice hockey, located in the Kenner Ruohonen Memorial History Room, open in the summer |
| Dekker Huis/ Zeeland Museum | Zeeland | Ottawa | West Michigan | Local history | website, operated by the Zeeland Historical Society |
| Delaware Copper Mine | Copper Harbor | Keweenaw | Upper Peninsula of Michigan | Industry - Mining | Copper mine tours and exhibits |
| Delta County Historical Museum | Escanaba | Delta | Upper Peninsula of Michigan | Local history | website, operated by the Delta County Historical Society, located next to Sand Point Light |
| Dennos Museum Center | Traverse City | Grand Traverse | Northern Michigan | Art | Part of Northwestern Michigan College, features an Inuit art collection |
| Depot Museum of Transportation | Grand Haven | Ottawa | West Michigan | Transportation | website, operated by the Tri-Cities Historical Museum of Grand Haven, housed in a restored 1870s railroad depot, exhibits on maritime, railroad and land transportation |
| Depot Museum | Clio | Genesee | Flint/Tri-Cities | Local history | Operated by the Clio Historical Association |
| Depot Museum & Customs House | Grosse Ile | Wayne | Southeast Michigan | Local history | website |
| DeTour Passage Historical Museum | DeTour | Chippewa | Upper Peninsula of Michigan | Local history | Includes clothing, pictures, record books, maritime and Native American artifacts |
| Detroit Historical Museum | Detroit | Wayne | Southeast Michigan | Local history | Operated by the Detroit Historical Society, includes a 19th-century street scene, local businesses including automobile companies, leaders, culture and heritage |
| Detroit Institute of Arts | Detroit | Wayne | Southeast Michigan | Art | American and European paintings, sculpture, furniture and decorative arts from the 18th century, 19th century, and 20th century, Greek, Roman, Etruscan, Mesopotamian, Egyptian, Islamic, African and Asian art |
| DeVos Art Museum | Marquette | Marquette | Upper Peninsula of Michigan | Art | website, part or the Art and Design Department at Northern Michigan University |
| Dexter Area Museum | Dexter | Washtenaw | Southeast Michigan | Local history | website, operated by the Dexter Area Historical Society in a late 19th-century former church |
| Dossin Great Lakes Museum | Detroit | Wayne | Southeast Michigan | Maritime | Located at Belle Isle Park in the SS William Clay Ford Pilot House, operated by the Detroit Historical Society |
| Dowagiac Area History Museum | Dowagiac | Cass | West Michigan | Local history | website, formerly the Museum at Southwestern Michigan College, history of Dowagiac, Cass County and Sister Lakes |
| Drake Memorial House | Breckenridge | Gratiot | Central Michigan | Historic house | website, operated by the Breckenridge-Wheeler Area Historical Society |
| Drummond Island Historical Museum | Drummond Island | Chippewa | Upper Peninsula of Michigan | Local history | |
| Durand Union Station | Durand | Shiawassee | Central Michigan | Railroad | Also known as Michigan Railroad History Museum, trains in WW II, Wallace Circus train wreck, Presidential whistle stops in Durand, model trains |
| Eagle Harbor Life-Saving Station | Eagle Harbor Township | Keweenaw | Upper Peninsula of Michigan | Maritime | Operated by the Keweenaw County Historical Society, includes boat and life-saving equipment |
| Eagle Harbor Lighthouse and Museums | Eagle Harbor Township | Keweenaw | Upper Peninsula of Michigan | Multiple | Keweenaw County Historical Society operates the lighthouse as a museum, and also operates other museums at the site, including the Maritime Museum, mining, Commercial Fishing Museum and Keweenaw History Museum; participating institution in Keweenaw National Historical Park |
| Eagle River Museum | Eagle River | Keweenaw | Upper Peninsula of Michigan | Local history | website, operated by the Keweenaw County Historical Society, themes include the Cliff Mine, the towns of Eagle River and Phoenix, the Phoenix mine, and the former amusement area known as Crestview |
| East Jordan Portside Art and Historical Society Museum | East Jordan | Charlevoix | Northern Michigan | Local history | website |
| Eaton County's Museum at Courthouse Square | Charlotte | Eaton | Central Michigan | History | website, local history, Native American artifacts, courthouse exhibits |
| Eby Log Cabin | Monroe | Monroe | Southeast Michigan | Historic house | Open during the Monroe County Fair, operated by the Monroe County Historical Society |
| Edsel and Eleanor Ford House | Grosse Pointe Shores | Macomb | Southeast Michigan | Historic house | Mansion with fine and decorative arts, many outbuildings and gardens on 87 acres (350,000 m^{2}) |
| Elaine L. Jacob Gallery | Detroit | Wayne | Southeast Michigan | Art | website, part of Wayne State University |
| Eli and Edythe Broad Art Museum | East Lansing | Ingham | Central Michigan | Art | Part of Michigan State University, contemporary art |
| Elk Rapids Historical Museum | Elks Rapids | Antrim | Northern Michigan | Local history | operated by the Elk Rapids Area Historical Society in a former church |
| Ella Sharp Museum | Jackson | Jackson | Central Michigan | Multiple | website, wildlife art, local history, changing art exhibits, 19th-century Ella Sharp House and interpretive center, a one-room schoolhouse, log house and tower barn |
| Empire Area Museum Center | Empire | Leelanau | Northern Michigan | Open-air | website, complex includes main museum, school house, 1911 Hose House, barn, gas station |
| Eyaawing Museum | Peshawbestown | Leelanau | Northern Michigan | Native American | History and culture of the Grand Traverse Band of Ottawa and Chippewa Indians |
| Engine House No. 5 Museum | Allendale Charter Township | Ottawa | West Michigan | Firefighting | website |
| Fallasburg Historical Village | Vergennes Township | Kent | West Michigan | Local history | website, operated by the Fallasburg Historical Society, includes the Fallasburg Bridge, a schoolhouse, village cemetery, the Fallasburg Historical Museum and the Misner House Museum |
| Fayette Historic Townsite | Garden | Delta | Upper Peninsula of Michigan | Living | Late Victorian life |
| Felt Mansion | Holland | Allegan | West Michigan | Historic house | Mid 20th-century mansion |
| Fenton Museum | Fenton | Genesee | Flint/Tri-Cities | Local history | Operated by the Fenton Historical Society |
| Ferndale Historical Museum | Ferndale | Oakland | Southeast Michigan | Local history | website, operated by the Ferndale Historical Society |
| Ferris State University Fine Art Gallery | Big Rapids | Mecosta | Northern Michigan | Art | website |
| Fife Lake Area Historical Museum | Fife Lake | Grand Traverse | Northern Michigan | Local history | website, operated by the Fife Lake Area Historical Society |
| Finnish American Heritage Center | Hancock | Houghton | Upper Peninsula of Michigan | Art | Part of Finlandia University, Finnish art gallery, culture, participating institution in Keweenaw National Historical Park |
| Fire Barn Museum | Muskegon | Muskegon | West Michigan | Firefighting | website, operated by Lakeshore Museum Center, firefighting equipment, gear |
| First Congregational Living Museum | Detroit | Wayne | Southeast Michigan | Church | Exhibits about church architecture and history, also houses Underground Railroad Living Museum, a storytelling experience |
| Flat River Historical Museum | Greenville | Montcalm | Central Michigan | Local history | website, operated by the Flat River Historical Society |
| Flat Rock Historical Museum | Flat Rock | Wayne | Southeast Michigan | Local history | website, operated by the Flat Rock Historical Society |
| Flint Children's Museum | Flint | Genesee | Flint/Tri-Cities | Children's | |
| Flint Institute of Arts | Flint | Genesee | Flint/Tri-Cities | Art | Collections of American, European, Native American, African, and Asian art including paintings, sculptures, prints, drawings, and decorative arts |
| Florence B. Dearing Museum | Hartland | Livingston | Southeast Michigan | Local history | website, operated by the Hartland Area Historical Society |
| Flora Kirsch Beck Gallery | Alma | Gratiot | Central Michigan | Art | website, part of Alma College |
| Flushing Depot Museum | Flushing | Genesee | Flint/Tri-Cities | Local history | website, operated by the Flushing Area Historical Society |
| Ford Piquette Avenue Plant | Detroit | Wayne | Southeast Michigan | Automotive | Birthplace of the Ford Model T and the world's oldest car factory building open to the public (built 1904) |
| Forever Curious Children's Museum | Fennville | Allegan | West Michigan | Children's | website, formerly known as Allegan County Children's Museum, trying to open a location in Allegan |
| Forsyth Township Historical Museum | Forsyth Township | Marquette | Upper Peninsula of Michigan | Local history | Operated by the Forsyth Township Historical Society |
| Fort de Buade Museum | St. Ignace | Mackinac | Upper Peninsula of Michigan | Native American | website, specializes in Native American objects of the pre-contact period, through the eras of the French, British and Americans of the area |
| Fort Gratiot Lighthouse | Port Huron | St. Clair | Southeast Michigan | Lighthouse | Tours operated through Port Huron Museum |
| Fort Mackinac | Mackinac Island | Mackinac | Northern Michigan | Fort | 14 original buildings and military exhibits, costumed interpreters |
| Fort St. Joseph Museum | Niles | Berrien | West Michigan | Local history | Located in the carriage house of the Henry A. Chapin House, exhibits include Fort St. Joseph, the Underground Railroad in southern Michigan, railroads in Niles' history, Lakota Indian collection |
| Fort Wayne | Detroit | Wayne | Southeast Michigan | Fort | Includes 1848 limestone barracks building, 1845 Star Fort, Commanding Officers house, Spanish–American War guard house and the Tuskegee Airmen Museum |
| Fort Wilkins and Copper Harbor Lighthouse | Copper Harbor | Keweenaw | Upper Peninsula of Michigan | Fort | 19 restored buildings, costumed interpreters, copper mining sites and lighthouse, participating institution in Keweenaw National Historical Park |
| Forty Mile Point Light | Rogers City | Presque Isle | Northern Michigan | Lighthouse | Operated by the Forty Mile Point Lighthouse Society |
| Frankenmuth Historical Museum | Frankenmuth | Saginaw | Flint/Tri-Cities | Local history | website, operated by the Frankenmuth Historical Association |
| Franklin Historical Museum | Franklin | Oakland | Southeast Michigan | Local history | website, operated by the Franklin Historic Society |
| Frank Murphy Memorial Museum | Harbor Beach | Huron | Flint/Tri-Cities | Historic house | Home of Michigan politician Frank Murphy |
| Frederik Meijer Gardens and Sculpture Park | Grand Rapids | Kent | West Michigan | Art | Botanical gardens with a conservatory, sculpture park and museum with over 170 sculptures by artists including Magdalena Abakanowicz, Jonathan Borofsky, Alexander Calder, Anthony Gormley, Mark di Suvero, Henry Moore, Claes Oldenburg, Marshall Fredericks, Arnaldo Pomodoro and Kenneth Snelson |
| Gaines Township Museum | Gaines Township | Kent | West Michigan | Local history | Historic one-room school, operated by the Gaines Charter Township Historical Society |
| Galesburg Historical Museum | Galesburg | Kalamazoo | West Michigan | Local history | |
| Ganton Art Gallery | Spring Arbor | Jackson | Central Michigan | Art | website, part of Spring Harbor University |
| Gardner House Museum | Albion | Calhoun | West Michigan | Local history | website, operated by the Albion Historical Society, Victorian house displays antique tools, artifacts, pictures and furniture |
| Gerald E. Eddy Discovery Center | Chelsea | Washtenaw | Southeast Michigan | Natural history | Geology and area habitats |
| Gerald R. Ford Presidential Library | Ann Arbor | Washtenaw | Southeast Michigan | Presidential library | Library about Gerald R. Ford |
| Gerald R. Ford Presidential Museum | Grand Rapids | Kent | West Michigan | Biographical | Museum about Gerald R. Ford |
| Gibraltar Historical Museum | Gibraltar | Wayne | Southeast Michigan | Local history | website |
| Gillette Sand Dune Visitor Center | Norton Shores | Muskegon | West Michigan | Natural history | Visitor center for Hoffmaster State Park |
| Gilmore Car Museum | Barry Township | Barry | West Michigan | Automotive | Restored historic barns exhibiting nearly 200 vehicles spanning more than 100 years of automotive heritage |
| Gitchee Gumee Museum | Grand Marais | Alger | Upper Peninsula of Michigan | Natural history | website, agates and minerals, local history |
| Gladwin County Historical Museum | Gladwin | Gladwin | Northern Michigan | Open-air | website, includes 2 restored cabins and a schoolhouse, farm and blacksmith tools, furniture, dishes, clothing, books, photos, operated by the Gladwin County Historical Society |
| Governor Charles Croswell House | Adrian | Lenawee | Southeast Michigan | Historic house | Mid 19th-century house |
| Governor's Mansion Museum | Marshall | Calhoun | West Michigan | Historic house | Operated by the Mary Marshall Chapter D.A.R., mid-19th-century Greek Revival mansion built in anticipation that Marshall would become the State Capital of Michigan |
| Governor Warner Mansion | Farmington | Oakland | Southeast Michigan | Historic house | website, Victorian Italianate mansion and gardens, home of Fred M. Warner |
| Grand Army of the Republic Hall | Marshall | Calhoun | West Michigan | Military | website, operated by the Marshall Historical Society, Civil War artifacts, local history |
| Grand Blanc Heritage Museum | Grand Blanc | Genesee | Flint/Tri-Cities | Local history | website, operated by the Grand Blanc Heritage Association |
| Grand Ledge Area Historical Society Museum | Grand Ledge | Eaton | Central Michigan | Local history | website |
| Grand Rapids Art Museum | Grand Rapids | Kent | West Michigan | Art | Renaissance to Modern art, with strength in European and American 19th- and 20th-century painting and sculpture |
| Grand Rapids Children's Museum | Grand Rapids | Kent | West Michigan | Children's | website |
| Grand Rapids Public Museum | Grand Rapids | Kent | West Michigan | Local history | Includes a carousel and planetarium |
| Grand Traverse Lighthouse | Northport | Leelanau | Northern Michigan | Lighthouse | Lighthouse and maritime museum located within Leelanau State Park |
| Grand Valley State University Art Galleries | Grand Rapids | Kent | West Michigan | Art | website, six galleries in both Grand Rapids and Allendale |
| Grattan Museum | Grattan | Kent | West Michigan | Local history | website, operated by the Grattan Historical Society |
| Great Lakes Children's Museum | Traverse City | Grand Traverse | Northern Michigan | Children's | website |
| Great Lakes Lore Maritime Museum | Rogers City | Presque Isle | Northern Michigan | Maritime | website, local maritime history from Native American traders to 21st century captains, includes Great Lakes Maritime Hall of Fame |
| Great Lakes Maritime Heritage Center | Alpena | Alpena | Northern Michigan | Maritime | Headquarters for the Thunder Bay National Marine Sanctuary, features exhibits on shipwrecks and the Great Lakes |
| Great Lakes Quilt Center | East Lansing | Ingham | Central Michigan | Art | Part of Michigan State University, quilts as art and history |
| Great Lakes Shipwreck Museum | Paradise | Chippewa | Upper Peninsula of Michigan | Maritime | Operated by the Great Lakes Shipwreck Historical Society, artifacts retrieved from local shipwrecks, also includes lighthouse keeper's quarters for Whitefish Point Light |
| Greenmead Historical Park | Livonia | Wayne | Southeast Michigan | Open-air | 1841 Greek Revival farmhouse and outbuildings on 92 acres (370,000 m^{2}) |
| Grice House Museum | Harbor Beach | Huron | Flint/Tri-Cities | Historic house | 19th-century house, barn and school |
| Grosse Pointe War Memorial | Grosse Pointe Farms | Wayne | Southeast Michigan | Military | |
| Grosvenor House Museum | Jonesville | Hillsdale | Central Michigan | Historic house | 19th-century Victorian mansion |
| Hack House Museum | Milan | Washtenaw | Southeast Michigan | Local history | Operated by the Milan Area Historical Society |
| Hackley & Hume Historic Site | Muskegon | Muskegon | West Michigan | Historic house | website, operated by Lakeshore Museum Center, Charles H. Hackley House and Hume House, 1890s period Victorian houses |
| Hadley House Museum | Holly | Oakland | Southeast Michigan | Local history | website, operated by Holly Historical Society |
| Hadley Mill Museum | Hadley Township | Lapeer | Flint/Tri-Cities | Mill | Operated by the Hadley Township Historical Society |
| Hamburg Historical Museum | Hamburg | Livingston | Southeast Michigan | Local history | website |
| Hammond House Museum | Union City | Branch | Central Michigan | Historic house | 19th-century house, operated by the Union City Historical Society |
| Hanka Finnish Homestead Museum | Pelkie | Baraga | Upper Peninsula of Michigan | Open-air | Self-sufficient Finnish homestead farm, participating institution in Keweenaw National Historical Park |
| Harbor Springs History Museum | Harbor Springs | Emmet | Northern Michigan | Local history | website, operated by the Harbor Springs Area Historical Society |
| Harbour House Museum | Crystal Falls | Iron | Upper Peninsula of Michigan | Historic house | |
| Harsha House Museum | Charlevoix | Charlevoix | Northern Michigan | Local history | website, operated by the Charlevoix Historical Society |
| Hartwick Pines Logging Museum | Grayling | Crawford | Northern Michigan | Industry | Logging camp buildings, exhibits and period rooms |
| Heddon Museum | Dowagiac | Cass | West Michigan | Sports | website, Heddon fishing lures, reels, rods, advertising |
| Henry Ford Estate - Fair Lane | Dearborn | Wayne | Southeast Michigan | Historic house | Features 56 rooms on 5 acres (20,000 m^{2}) of gardens and grounds |
| The Henry Ford | Dearborn | Wayne | Southeast Michigan | Multiple | Museum complex: living, science, history, automotive, transportation, technology and biographical about Henry Ford; formerly known as the Henry Ford Museum and Greenfield Village |
| Heritage House | Essexville | Bay | Flint/Tri-Cities | Historic house | Early 20th-century Victorian period house |
| Heritage Museum and Cultural Center | St. Joseph | Berrien | West Michigan | Local history | website, located in the Priscilla U. Byrns Heritage Center |
| Historic Adventist Village | Battle Creek | Calhoun | West Michigan | Religious | website, restored or replicated buildings featuring the heritage of the Seventh-day Adventist Church |
| Historic Bowens Mills | Yankee Springs Township | Barry | West Michigan | Open-air | website, 19-acre (77,000 m^{2}) historical park with grist mill, school house, 1860s house, log cabin, water wheel |
| Historic Chapin Mansion | Niles | Berrien | West Michigan | Historic house | 1880s Aesthetic Period mansion |
| Historic Mill Creek Discovery Park | Mackinaw City | Cheboygan | Northern Michigan | Multiple | Living history and natural history programs, period settings, discovery centers with interactive technological exhibits, archaeological ruin exhibits and artifact vitrines, interpretive panels, nature trails |
| Historic Pelkie Grade School | Pelkie | Baraga | Upper Peninsula of Michigan | School | website, operated by the Sturgeon Valley Historical Society |
| Historic Village at Goodells County Park | Goodells | St. Clair | Southeast Michigan | Open-air | website, includes St. Clair County Farm Museum, Lynn Township Schoolhouse, Murphy/Ryan Farmhouse, C.C. Peck and Company bank |
| History Center at Courthouse Square | Berrien Springs | Berrien | West Michigan | Local history | website, operated by the Berrien County Historical Association, includes 1839 Courthouse, 1830 Log House, 1870 Sheriff's House |
| Holland Museum | Holland | Ottawa | West Michigan | Local history | Dutch paintings and decorative arts, Lake Michigan maritime history, industry, immigration |
| Holocaust Memorial Center | Farmington Hills | Oakland | Southeast Michigan | Ethnic | Includes Museum of European Jewish Heritage, International Institute of the Righteous |
| Honolulu House | Marshall | Calhoun | West Michigan | Historic house | Operated by the Marshall Historical Society, 1880s-period house |
| Houghton County Historical Museum | Lake Linden | Houghton | Upper Peninsula of Michigan | Open-air | Operated by the Houghton County Historical Society, site includes a railroad, one room schoolhouse, the Houghton County Historical Society Heritage Center and a WPA-era log cabin; participating institution in Keweenaw National Historical Park |
| Houghton Lake Area Historical Village and Playhouse | Prudenville | Roscommon | Upper Peninsula of Michigan | Open-air | website, life in a typical logging village of Northern Michigan in the late 19th century, operated by the Houghton Lake Area Historical Society |
| Hudson Historical Museum | Hudson | Lenawee | Southeast Michigan | Local history | |
| Huron City Museums | Huron City | Huron | Flint/Tri-Cities | Open-air | website, operated by the William Lyon Phelps Foundation, includes Victorian house, log cabin, church, general store, carriage shed, life-saving station and barns |
| Huron Lightship (LV-103) | Port Huron | St. Clair | Southeast Michigan | Maritime | Part of Port Huron Museum |
| Hyser Rivers Museum | Plainfield Township | Kent | West Michigan | Local history | website, operated by the Plainfield Township Historical Preservation Committee |
| Icebreaker Mackinaw Maritime Museum | Mackinaw City | Cheboygan | Northern Michigan | Maritime | Museum ship United States Coast Guard Cutter Mackinaw WAGB-83 |
| Imlay City Historical Museum | Imlay City | Lapeer | Flint/Tri-Cities | Local history | website |
| Impression 5 Science Center | Lansing | Ingham | Central Michigan | Science | Hands-on science exhibits for children |
| Inland Seas Education Center | Suttons Bay | Leelanau | Northern Michigan | Natural history | website, history, ecology and economics of the Great Lakes |
| Inland Water Route Historical Society Museum | Alanson | Emmet | Northern Michigan | Local history | website |
| International Gospel Music Hall of Fame and Museum | Detroit | Wayne | Southeast Michigan | Hall of fame | website, open by appointment only |
| Iosco County Historical Museum | East Tawas | Iosco | Northern Michigan | Local history | website, operated by the Iosco County Historical Society |
| Iron County Historical Museum | Caspian | Iron | Upper Peninsula of Michigan | Multiple | website, 22 buildings including a Heritage Hall, two Mining Halls, a cultural center, Lee LeBlanc Wildlife Art Gallery, Giovanelli Italianati Art Gallery, Homestead and Lumbercamp with log buildings, The Carrie Jacobs Bond Victorian house & Museum Book & Gift Shop |
| IXL Historical Museum | Hermansville | Menonimee | Upper Peninsula of Michigan | Open-air | Former lumber and hardwood manufacturing village |
| Japanese Cultural Center and Tea House | Saginaw | Saginaw | Flint/Tri-Cities | Culture | website, Japanese garden, tea house, culture demonstrations |
| Jenison Historical Museum | Jenison | Ottawa | West Michigan | Historic house | website, located in the Husband-Hanchett-Tiffany House, operated by the Jenison Historical Association |
| Jim Crow Museum of Racist Memorabilia | Big Rapids | Mecosta | Northern Michigan | Culture | Part of Ferris State University, racist memorabilia |
| John Pahl Historical Village | Allegan | Allegan | West Michigan | Open-air | Operated by the Allegan County Historical Society, located within the Allegan County Fairgrounds, open during the fair and by appointment |
| Kalamazoo Institute of Arts | Kalamazoo | Kalamazoo | West Michigan | Art | |
| Kalamazoo Valley Museum | Kalamazoo | Kalamazoo | West Michigan | Multiple | History, science, technology, operated by Kalamazoo Valley Community College |
| Kaleva Bottle House Museum | Manistee | Manistee | Northern Michigan | Historic house | House built of bottle wall construction in 1941 |
| Kaleva Train Depot Museum | Manistee | Manistee | Northern Michigan | Railroad | website |
| Kalkaska County Museum | Kalkaska | Kalkaska | Northern Michigan | Local history | website, operated by the Kalkaska County Historical Society in a historic depot |
| Kelsey Museum of Archaeology | Ann Arbor | Washtenaw | Southeast Michigan | Archaeology | Part of the University of Michigan, Mediterranean civilizations |
| Kempf House Museum | Ann Arbor | Washtenaw | Southeast Michigan | Historic house | website, Victorian Greek-Revival house showing how a German-American family lived in the 1890s |
| Kent City Museum | Kent City | Kent | West Michigan | Railroad | website, operated by the Kent City Area Historical Group |
| Keweenaw Heritage Center | Calumet | Houghton | Upper Peninsula of Michigan | Local history | website, located in the former St. Anne's Church |
| Keweenaw National Historical Park | Calumet | Houghton | Upper Peninsula of Michigan | Industry - Mining | |
| Kids 'N' Stuff Children's Museum | Albion | Calhoun | West Michigan | Children's | website |
| Kimball House Museum | Battle Creek | Calhoun | West Michigan | Historic house | website, operated by the Historical Society of Battle Creek, Victorian-era mansion, features room about Sojourner Truth |
| Kingman Museum | Battle Creek | Calhoun | West Michigan | Natural history | Exhibits include paleontology, geology specimens, wildlife mounts, a preserved human embryo and fetus exhibit, Native American artifacts and a planetarium |
| K.I. Sawyer Heritage Museum | Gwinn | Marquette | Upper Peninsula of Michigan | Transportation - Aviation | website, adjacent to Sawyer International Airport, contributions made by the men, women and machines of K I Sawyer Air Force Base, Michigan to America's Cold War defense mission |
| Knowlton's Ice Museum of North America | Port Huron | St. Clair | Southeast Michigan | History | website, over 3,000 items used in the cutting, harvesting, storing, selling and use of natural ice as used by the ice industry of years ago |
| Krasl Art Center | St. Joseph | Berrien | West Michigan | Art | website, visual arts center with exhibit galleries |
| Kruizenga Art Museum | Holland | Ottawa | West Michigan | Art | Teaching museum on Hope College's campus |
| Kreft Center Gallery | Ann Arbor | Washtenaw | Southeast Michigan | Art | website, part of Concordia University |
| Lake Odessa Museum | Lake Odessa | Ionia | Central Michigan | Local history | Operated by the Lake Odessa Area Historical Society, area and railroad history, includes a Pere Marquette Depot built in 1887, a restored Grand Trunk caboose, the Freight Station Museum which houses local historical displays and the Hosford House |
| Lakeshore Museum Center | Muskegon | Muskegon | West Michigan | Multiple | website, area natural and cultural history, lumber industry, and Scolnik House, a Depression-era period house |
| Lakeview Area Museum | Lakeview | Montcalm | Central Michigan | Local history | website, operated by the Lakeview Historical Society |
| Lansing Art Gallery | Lansing | Ingham | Central Michigan | Art | Gallery and education center for visual arts |
| Lapeer County Heritage Museum | Lapeer | Lapeer | Flint/Tri-Cities | Local history | website, operated by the Lapeer County Historical Society |
| Laurium Manor Inn | Laurium | Houghton | Upper Peninsula of Michigan | Historic house | Tours of the Victorian era hotel, participating institution in Keweenaw National Historical Park |
| Leelanau Historical Museum | Leland | Leelanau | Northern Michigan | Local history | Includes exhibit of Anishinaabe black ash baskets and quillwork on birch bark |
| Lenawee Historical Society Museum | Adrian | Lenawee | Southeast Michigan | Local history | |
| Les Cheneaux Historical Museum | Cedarville | Mackinac | Upper Peninsula of Michigan | Local history | website, operated by the Les Cheneaux Historical Association, exhibits on lumbering, fishing, tourism, quilting, weaving, recreational activities |
| Les Cheneaux Maritime Museum | Cedarville | Mackinac | Upper Peninsula of Michigan | Maritime | website, operated by the Les Cheneaux Historical Association, includes vintage boats, marine artifacts, antique outboard motors, photos and a boat building workshop |
| Lewiston Area Historical Museum | Lewiston | Montmorency | Northern Michigan | Local history | |
| Liberty Hyde Bailey Museum | South Haven | Van Buren | West Michigan | Historic house | Home and memorial to American horticulturist Liberty Hyde Bailey |
| Lighthouse Keepers House and Museum | Grand Marais | Alger | Upper Peninsula of Michigan | Maritime | Operated by the Grand Marais Historical Society |
| Lincoln Park Historical Museum | Lincoln Park | Wayne | Southeast Michigan | Local history | website, operated by the Lincoln Park Historical Society |
| Lincoln Train Depot | Lincoln | Alcona | Northern Michigan | Railroad | Includes a restored caboose and switching engine, operated by the Alcona Historical Society |
| Linden Mills Historical Museum | Linden | Genesee | Flint/Tri-Cities | Local history | website, operated by the Linden Mills Historical Society |
| Little Sable Point Light | Mears | Oceana | West Michigan | Lighthouse | |
| Little Traverse History Museum | Petoskey | Emmet | Northern Michigan | Local history | website, special exhibits on Ernest Hemingway, operated by the Little Traverse Historical Society |
| Loren Andrus Octagon House | Washington Township | Macomb | Southeast Michigan | Historic house | 1860 house used as a station on the Underground Railroad |
| Lowell Area Historical Museum | Lowell | Kent | West Michigan | Local history | website |
| LSSU Arts Center Gallery | Sault Ste. Marie | Chippewa | Upper Peninsula of Michigan | Art | website, part of Lake Superior State University, houses the L. F. Noyes Collection of Native American and Western Art |
| Luce County Historical Museum | Newberry | Luce | Upper Peninsula of Michigan | Historic house | Combination jail and sheriff's residence |
| Luckhard Museum | Sebewaing | Huron | Flint/Tri-Cities | Local history | Pioneer & Indian relics |
| Ludington Light | Ludington | Mason | Northern Michigan | Maritime | Lighthouse open to the public during the summer season for climbing tours |
| Lumberman's Monument | Oscoda | Iosco | Northern Michigan | Industry - Logging | Monument and visitor center with exhibits about logging industry |
| Mackinac Island State Park | Mackinac Island | Mackinac | Northern Michigan | Multiple | Includes Fort Mackinac and Fort Holmes, several museum buildings in historic downtown: McGulpin House, American Fur Company Store & Dr. Beaumont Museum, Biddle House, Benjamin Blacksmith Shop, McGulpin House, and Mission Church |
| Mackinaw Bridge Museum | Mackinaw City | Cheboygan | Northern Michigan | Technology | website, construction of the Mackinac Bridge |
| Manistee County Historical Museum | Manistee | Manistee | Northern Michigan | Local history | website, located in a historic store, exhibits include the Civil War, pioneer life, antiques and maritime history; also operates another facility in the historic Waterworks building, exhibits include logging, railroad, and marine exhibits and memorabilia of Manistee in the 19th century |
| Mann House | Concord | Jackson | Central Michigan | Historic house | 1880s Victorian home, furnishings and gardens |
| Manton Area Historical Museum | Manton | Wexford | Northern Michigan | Local history | Operated by the Manton Area Historical Society; adjacent Veteran's Memorial Museum |
| Marilla Museum | Copemish | Manistee | Northern Michigan | Open-air | website, Pioneer Place: 1860s fully furnished log house, early 20th-century barn and a full-size replica logger's cabin; operated by the Marilla Historical Society |
| Marine City Pride & Heritage Museum | Marine City | St. Clair | Southeast Michigan | Local history | website |
| Marquette Arts and Culture Center | Marquette | Marquette | Upper Peninsula of Michigan | Art | website, community art center, located in the lower level of the Peter White Public Library |
| Marquette Regional History Center | Marquette | Marquette | Upper Peninsula of Michigan | Local history | website |
| Marquette Harbor Light | Marquette | Marquette | Upper Peninsula of Michigan | Lighthouse | Operated by the Marquette Maritime Museum |
| Marquette Maritime Museum | Marquette | Marquette | Upper Peninsula of Michigan | Maritime | website, collection of Great Lakes Lighthouse lenses including 2nd, 3rd and 4th order "Classical" Fresnel Lenses, also operates Marquette Harbor Light |
| Marshlands Museum and Nature Center | Brownstown | Wayne | Southeast Michigan | Natural history | Natural and cultural history of Southeast Michigan |
| Marvin's Marvelous Mechanical Museum | Farmington Hills | Oakland | Southeast Michigan | Technology | Historical and modern arcade machines, sideshow wonders, fortune tellers, automatons, and curiosities |
| Mary's City of David Museum | Benton Harbor | Berrien | West Michigan | Religious | website, open-air museum about the House of David Christian commune |
| Marysville Historical Museum | Marysville | St. Clair | Southeast Michigan | Local history | website |
| Marshall M. Fredericks Sculpture Museum | University Center | Saginaw | Flint/Tri-Cities | Art | Part of Saginaw Valley State University, displays plaster models of Marshall Fredericks bronze sculptures, also changing art exhibits |
| Marshall Postal Museum | Marshall | Calhoun | West Michigan | History | Postal artifacts and memorabilia, open by appointment |
| Martha Barker Country Store Museum | Monroe | Monroe | Southeast Michigan | Store | Open by appointment |
| Mason Area Historical Society Museum | Mason | Ingham | Central Michigan | Local history | website |
| Mayville Area Museum of History | Mayville | Tuscola | Flint/Tri-Cities | Local history | website |
| McGulpin Point Light | Mackinaw City | Emmet | Northern Michigan | Lighthouse | Open on summer weekends |
| Meadow Brook Hall | Rochester Hills | Oakland | Southeast Michigan | Historic house | 110-room, 88,000-square-foot (8,200 m^{2}) mansion, contains paintings by Rembrandt, Anthony van Dyck, Rosa Bonheur, Gilbert Stuart, Joshua Reynolds, John Constable and Thomas Gainsborough, and sculpture by Antoine-Louis Barye, Frederic Remington, Cyrus Edwin Dallin, and Herbert Haseltine |
| Mecosta County Historical Museum | Big Rapids | Mecosta | Northern Michigan | Local history | Operated by the Mecosta County Historical Society |
| Menominee County Heritage Museum | Menominee | Menominee | Upper Peninsula of Michigan | Local history | website, operated by the Menominee County Historical Society |
| Menominee Range Historical Museum | Iron Mountain | Dickinson | Upper Peninsula of Michigan | Local history | website, operated by the Menominee Range Historical Foundation |
| Meridian Historical Village | Meridian | Ingham | Central Michigan | Open-air | website, 19th-century period buildings, open seasonally |
| Mesick Area Historical Museum | Mesick | Wexford | Northern Michigan | Local history | website |
| Meyer May House | Grand Rapids | Kent | West Michigan | Historic house | Restored 1909 house designed by Frank Lloyd Wright |
| Michigamme Museum | Michigamme | Marquette | Upper Peninsula of Michigan | Local history | website |
| Michigan Art Walk | Big Rapids | Mecosta | Northern Michigan | Art | website, collection of original artwork created by Michigan artists, located at Ferris State University |
| Michigan Firehouse Museum | Ypsilanti | Washtenaw | Southeast Michigan | Firefighting | website, formerly Ypsilanti Antique Auto, Truck and Fire Museum, then Michigan Antique Fire Equipment Preservation Group Museum |
| Michigan Flywheelers Museum | South Haven | Van Buren | West Michigan | Technology | website, antique gas and steam engines and tractors |
| Michigan Heritage Park | Whitehall | Muskegon | West Michigan | Open-air | Includes a mastodon site, Native American village, authentic and reproduction furnished buildings representing different eras in state history |
| Michigan Heroes Museum | Frankenmuth | Saginaw | Flint/Tri-Cities | Military | website, honors Michigan soldiers, sailors, aviators and astronauts who fought in our nation's foreign wars and bravely explored outer space; formerly known as Michigan's Military & Space Heroes Museum |
| Michigan History Museum | Lansing | Ingham | Central Michigan | History | website, 5 levels of Michigan history, part of the Michigan Historical Center |
| Michigan Iron Industry Museum | Negaunee | Marquette | Upper Peninsula of Michigan | Industry | website, state's iron mining industry |
| Michigan Legacy Art Park | Thompsonville | Benzie | Northern Michigan | Art | Outdoor sculpture park with works that interpret Michigan's history |
| Michigan Magazine Museum | Comins | Oscoda | Northern Michigan | History | website, Michigan memorabilia |
| Michigan Maritime Museum | South Haven | Van Buren | West Michigan | Maritime | website, Coast Guard and lifesaving, local fishing, maritime lore, Friends Good Will 1810 square topsail sloop |
| Michigan Masonic Museum and Library | Grand Rapids | Kent | West Michigan | Masonic | website, includes Masonic photographs, jewels, aprons, charts and carpets |
| Michigan Military Technical Historical Society | Eastpointe | Macomb | Southeast Michigan | Military | website, history of Michigan's civilian and military personnel in 20th-century conflicts |
| Michigan Museum of Military Transport | Grayling | Crawford | Northern Michigan | Transportation | website, military vehicles, currently no permanent facility |
| Michigan Science Center | Detroit | Wayne | Southeast Michigan | Science | Hands-on science, technology, engineering exhibits in a fun dynamic environment |
| Michigan State University Bug House | East Lansing | Ingham | Central Michigan | Natural history | website, live and mounted insects |
| Michigan State University Museum | East Lansing | Ingham | Central Michigan | Multiple | website, part of Michigan State University, natural history, culture including Asia, Africa, and the Americas, and the Great Lakes Quilt Center |
| Michigan Supreme Court Learning Center | Lansing | Ingham | Central Michigan | History | website, exhibits on government and legal system in Michigan |
| Michigan Transit Museum | Mount Clemens | Macomb | Southeast Michigan | Transportation - Railroad | Historic depot restored to its 1900 appearance with exhibits of railroad stock and equipment |
| Michigan Whitetail Hall of Fame Museum | Grass Lake | Jackson | Central Michigan | Natural history | Over 50 Boone And Crockett world record buck racks, live deer |
| Michigan Women's Hall of Fame | Lansing | Ingham | Central Michigan | Hall of fame | Cultural and historical exhibits on the accomplishments and achievements of Michigan women, also an art gallery |
| Midland Center for the Arts | Midland | Midland | Flint/Tri-Cities | Multiple | Performing arts and museum complex, includes Alden B. Dow Museum of Science & Art and Midland County Historical Society's Heritage Park |
| Midland County Historical Society's Heritage Park | Midland | Midland | Flint/Tri-Cities | Multiple | Interactive local history exhibits, history of the Dow Chemical Company, 1874 Historic Gothic Victorian House, collection of historic sleighs and carriages and more |
| Mid-Michigan Children's Museum | Saginaw | Saginaw | Flint/Tri-Cities | Children's | website |
| Milford Historical Museum | Milford | Oakland | Southeast Michigan | Historic houses | website, operated by the Milford Historical Society, 1835 Greek-revival Victorian house and log cabin |
| Millington - Arbela Historical Society Museum | Millington | Tuscola | Flint/Tri-Cities | Local history | website |
| Mill Race Historical Village | Northville | Wayne | Southeast Michigan | Open-air | website, operated by the Northville Historical Society, relocated 19th-century village buildings |
| Milwaukee Clipper | Muskegon | Muskegon | West Michigan | Museum ship | Retired passenger ship and automobile ferry |
| Mission Point Lighthouse | Peninsula Township | Grand Traverse | Northern Michigan | Lighthouse | |
| Monroe County Historical Museum | Monroe | Monroe | Southeast Michigan | Local history | website, operated by the Monroe County Historical Commission, exhibits include George Armstrong Custer, local military, Native American and settler history; Martha Barker Country Store Museum and Navarre Anderson Trading Post Complex are open only by appointment |
| Monroe County Labor History Museum | Monroe | Monroe | Southeast Michigan | History | website, history of organized labor movement in Michigan |
| Monroe County Vietnam Veterans Historical Museum | Monroe | Monroe | Southeast Michigan | Military | website |
| Montague Museum | Montague | Muskegon | West Michigan | Local history | website, located in a former church, operated by the Montague Historical Association |
| Montcalm Heritage Village | Sidney | Montcalm | Central Michigan | Open air | website, operated by Montcalm Community College, 28 buildings with artifacts from local areas depicting life in Michigan in turn the turn of the 20th Century |
| Montrose Historical and Telephone Pioneer Museum | Montrose | Genesee | Flint/Tri-Cities | Technology | website, antique and novelty telephones and equipment, local history, operated by the Montrose Area Historical Association |
| Morton House Museum | Benton Harbor | Berrien | West Michigan | Historic house | website |
| Motorsports Hall of Fame of America | Novi | Oakland | Southeast Michigan | Hall of fame | Hall of fame for drivers on land, sea and air, museum features Indy Cars, stock cars, sports cars, dragsters, race trucks and openwheelers |
| Motown Museum | Detroit | Wayne | Southeast Michigan | Music | Also known as Hitsville U.S.A., dedicated to the legacy of the Motown Records, its artists and music |
| Munising Falls Interpretive Center | Munising | Alger | Upper Peninsula of Michigan | Local history | Located in Pictured Rocks National Lakeshore, natural and cultural history of the area |
| Museum of Contemporary Art Detroit | Detroit | Wayne | Southeast Michigan | Art | |
| Museum of Cultural & Natural History | Mount Pleasant | Isabella | Central Michigan | Multiple | website, part of Central Michigan University, natural history dioramas, cultural artifacts |
| Museum of New Art | Troy | Oakland | Southeast Michigan | Art | Contemporary art, commonly known as MoNA, locations in Troy and Armada, Michigan |
| Museum of Ojibwa Culture | St. Ignace | Mackinac | Upper Peninsula of Michigan | Native American | Exhibits include Ojibwa culture and traditions, first contact with French explorers, and the former mission's archaeological past |
| Museum on Main Street | Ann Arbor | Washtenaw | Southeast Michigan | Local history | website, operated by the Washtenaw County Historical Society |
| Museum Ship Valley Camp | Sault Ste. Marie | Chippewa | Upper Peninsula of Michigan | Museum ship | Also known as Steamship Valley Camp, Great Lakes freighter museum ship housing a 20,000-square-foot (1,900 m^{2}) museum with over 100 maritime exhibits, 4 aquariums and two lifeboats from the wreck of the S.S. Edmund Fitzgerald |
| Music House Museum | Acme | Grand Traverse | Northern Michigan | Music | website, antique musical instruments and music-making machines from 1870 through 1930 |
| Muskegon Museum of Art | Muskegon | Muskegon | West Michigan | Art | website |
| Muskegon Heritage Museum | Muskegon | Muskegon | West Michigan | Local history | website, featuring Muskegon's industrial, business and historic homes with working machinery |
| Myers School Museum | Sparta Township | Kent | West Michigan | Railroad | 19th-century schoolhouse |
| Nankin Mills Interpretive Center | Westland | Wayne | Southeast Michigan | Nature center | Exhibits on local natural and cultural history in a historic grist mill |
| National Miniatures Trust Museum | Hickory Corners | Barry | West Michigan | Toy | website, dolls and miniatures, on the grounds of the Gilmore Car Museum |
| Navarre-Anderson Trading Post | Monroe | Monroe | Southeast Michigan | History | Late 18th-century trading post owned by the Monroe County Historical Museum, open for special events and group tours |
| Negaunee Historical Museum | Negaunee | Marquette | Upper Peninsula of Michigan | Local history | website, operated by the Negaunee Historical Society, area iron mining, 19th century living room, local history and culture |
| Nelis' Dutch Village | Holland | Ottawa | West Michigan | Culture | website, shopping theme park featuring buildings of authentic Dutch architecture, brick walkways, canals, gardens and special presentations depicting life in a typical village in the Netherlands in the late 19th century; includes Kolean Museum featuring Dutch clothing, farm and cheese making equipment |
| New Buffalo Railroad Museum | New Buffalo | Berrien | West Michigan | Railway | website |
| New Presque Isle Light | Presque Isle | Presque Isle | Northern Michigan | Lighthouse | |
| Newton House Museum | Dowagiac | Cass | West Michigan | Historic house | Restored two-story Quaker home of the mid-1800s |
| North Berrien Historical Museum | Coloma | Berrien | West Michigan | Local history | website, operated by the North Berrien Historical Society, history of the resorts of the Paw Paw Lakes, fruit farming, businesses, industries, and people of the area |
| Northeast Oakland Historical Museum | Oxford | Oakland | Southeast Michigan | Local history | website |
| Oakfield Pioneer Heritage Museum | Oakfield Township | Kent | West Michigan | Local history | website, operated by the Oakfield Pioneer Heritage Society |
| Oakland University Art Gallery | Rochester | Oakland | Southeast Michigan | Art | website, formerly known as Meadow Brook Art Gallery |
| Oceana County Historical Park | Mears | Oceana | West Michigan | Open-air | Operated by the Oceana County Historical & Genealogical Society, includes five museums: Swift Lathers Museum, Tool Museum, Boynton Cottage Museum, Transportation Museum, Robinson Museum |
| Ogemaw Historical Museum | West Branch | Ogemaw | Northern Michigan | Local history | Operated by the Ogemaw Genealogical & Historical Society |
| Ontonagon Historical Museum | Ontonagon | Ontonagon | Upper Peninsula of Michigan | Local history | Operated by the Ontonagon Historical Society, participating institution in Keweenaw National Historical Park |
| Ontonagon Light | Ontonagon | Ontonagon | Upper Peninsula of Michigan | Local history | Operated by the Ontonagon Historical Society |
| Old Bailey School | Harrisville | Alcona | Northern Michigan | School | Open for special events, operated by the Alcona Historical Society |
| Old Depot Museum | Ironwood | Gogebic | Upper Peninsula of Michigan | Local history | Operated by the Ironwood Area Historical Society |
| Old Fence Rider Historical Center | Edmore | Montcalm | Central Michigan | Local history | website, historical collection of Western heritage |
| Old Mackinac Point Lighthouse | Mackinaw City | Cheboygan | Northern Michigan | Lighthouse | Lighthouse and museum |
| Old Mill Museum | Dundee | Monroe | Southeast Michigan | Local history | Fashion, furniture, farm life, Native Americans, legacy of Henry Ford |
| Old Post Office Museum | Grand Marais | Alger | Upper Peninsula of Michigan | Local history | Operated by the Grand Marais Historical Society |
| Old Presque Isle Light | Presque Isle | Presque Isle | Northern Michigan | Lighthouse | Museum and inoperative lighthouse |
| Old Rugged Cross Historical Museum | Reed City | Osceola | Northern Michigan | Local history | Also life of George Bennard, composer of the hymn The Old Rugged Cross |
| Old Victoria | Rockland Township | Ontonagon | Upper Peninsula of Michigan | Historic house | Victorian copper mining town, participating institution in Keweenaw National Historical Park |
| Orchard Lake Museum | Orchard Lake | Oakland | Southeast Michigan | Local history | website, operated by the Greater West Bloomfield Historical Society |
| Ortonville Historical Society Museum | Ortonville | Oakland | Southeast Michigan | Local history | website, housed in an old mill |
| Otsego County Historical Museum | Gaylord | Otsego | Northern Michigan | Local history | website, operated by the Otsego County Historical Society |
| Ottawa Visitor Center | Watersmeet | Gogebic | Upper Peninsula of Michigan | Natural history | Visitor center for Ottawa National Forest, environmental education programs, maps, area information, interpretive exhibits, accessible trails |
| Our Savior's Historical Museum | Manistee | Manistee | Northern Michigan | Local history | Historic Danish Evangelical Lutheran church with exhibits on early Scandinavian settlement in the area |
| Overbrook Gallery | Muskegon | Muskegon | West Michigan | Art | website, located in the Frauenthal Fine Arts Center on the campus of Muskegon Community College, exhibits work by local, Michigan, and out-of-state artists and MCC art students |
| Padzieski Art Gallery | Dearborn | Wayne | Southeast Michigan | Art | website, part of the Ford Community & Performing Arts Center, operated by the Dearborn Community Arts Council |
| Paine-Gillam-Scott Museum | St. Johns | Clinton | Central Michigan | Local history | website, also known as the Clinton County Historical Society Museum |
| Paint Creek Center for the Arts | Rochester | Oakland | Southeast Michigan | Art | website, visual arts center |
| Parker Mill | Ann Arbor | Washtenaw | Southeast Michigan | Mill | Late 19th-century working grain mill |
| Pascoe House Museum | Republic | Marquette | Upper Peninsula of Michigan | Historic house | website, operated by the Republic Area Historical Society |
| Paulson House | Au Train | Alger | Upper Peninsula of Michigan | Historic house | 1884 Swedish log house |
| Peninsula Point Light | Stonginton | Delta | Upper Peninsula of Michigan | Lighthouse | Visitors can climb the lighthouse tower, operated by Hiawatha National Forest |
| Pentwater Historical Museum | Pentwater | Oceana | West Coast resort town | History of the area | visitors can use Guide by Cell for narration |
| Pewabic Pottery | Detroit | Wayne | Southeast Michigan | Decorative art | Arts & Crafts ceramics and contemporary pottery |
| Phoenix Church and Museum | Phoenix | Keweenaw | Upper Peninsula of Michigan | Religious | Restored 19th-century Catholic church |
| Pickford Historical Museum | Pickford | Chippewa | Upper Peninsula of Michigan | Local history | Operated by the Pickford Area Historical Society |
| Pickle Barrel House Museum | Grand Marais | Alger | Upper Peninsula of Michigan | Historic house | Operated by the Grand Marais Historical Society |
| Pigeon Depot Museum | Pigeon | Huron | Flint/Tri-Cities | Local history | website, operated by the Pigeon Historical Society |
| Pine Forest Historical Museum | Edmore | Montcalm | Central Michigan | Local history | |
| Pine Grove Historical Museum | Pontiac | Oakland | Southeast Michigan | Multiple | website, operated by the Oakville County Pioneer and Historical Society, complex include Pine Grove, the former estate of Governor Moses Wisner and outbuildings, the Drayton Plains One-Room Schoolhouse, the Carriage House, the Pioneer Museum with tools and farm implements |
| Pioneer Log Cabin Museum | Cassopolis | Cass | West Michigan | Historic house | Includes tools, farm equipment, quilts and dolls |
| Pioneer Log Village | Bad Axe | Huron | Flint/Tri-Cities | Open-air | website, operated by the Bad Axe Historical Society, pioneer home, general store, school, chapel, barn and blacksmith shop |
| Plank Road Museum | Breckenridge | Gratiot | Central Michigan | Local history | website, operated by the Breckenridge-Wheeler Area Historical Society |
| Plymouth Historical Museum | Plymouth | Wayne | Southeast Michigan | Local history | website, growth of American industry, the advent of the railroad and the invention of the automobile |
| Podunk House & Pioneer Museum | Fenton | Genesee | Flint/Tri-Cities | Local history | website, home and museum for the Pioneer Memorial Association of Fenton & Mundy Townships; 1837 Greek-revival pioneer family home, museum with tools and artifacts of early settlers |
| Point Betsie Light | Frankfort | Benzie | Northern Michigan | Lighthouse | |
| Point Iroquois Light | Whitefish Bay | Chippewa | Upper Peninsula of Michigan | Lighthouse | Operated by the Bay Mills-Brimley Historical Research Society in Hiawatha National Forest |
| Pointe aux Barques Lighthouse | Huron Township | Huron | Flint/Tri-Cities | Lighthouse | Two museums, one about shipwrecks in Lake Huron, the other about the lighthouse |
| Polish Home Army Museum | Orchard Lake | Oakland | Southeast Michigan | Military | Struggle for the freedom and independence of Poland during World War II |
| Port Austin History Center | Port Austin | Huron | Flint/Tri-Cities | Local history | website, operated by the Port Austin Historical Society |
| Port Huron Museum | Port Huron | St. Clair | Southeast Michigan | Multiple | Four museums: Carnegie Center -- Port Huron Museum, Huron Lightship, Thomas Edison Depot Museum and Fort Gratiot Lighthouse |
| Presque Isle County Historical Museum | Rogers City | Presque Isle | Northern Michigan | Local history | Located in the Craftsman-style Bradley House, includes period rooms, toys, Native American artifacts, country store, tools and other exhibits |
| Quincy Mine | Hancock | Houghton | Upper Peninsula of Michigan | Industry - Mining | Copper mine, mine buildings and mining exhibits; participating institution in Keweenaw National Historical Park |
| Railroad Depot Museum | Sparta Township | Kent | West Michigan | Railroad | Artifacts from the Muskegon, Saginaw and Toledo Railway, open for festivals and by appointment |
| Rathbone School | Eagle Harbor Township | Keweenaw | Upper Peninsula of Michigan | School | Operated by the Keweenaw County Historical Society, 19th-century period one-room school, participating institution in Keweenaw National Historical Park |
| Raven Hill Discovery Center | East Jordan | Charlevoix | Northern Michigan | Multiple | Regional science and technology center, also art, history and culture |
| Region of Three Oaks Museum | Three Oaks | Berrien | West Michigan | Local history | website |
| Rentschler Farm Museum | Saline | Washtenaw | Southeast Michigan | Agriculture, open-air | Operated by the Saline Historical Society, farm living between the years 1900–1950 with a house and 11 farm outbuildings |
| R. E. Olds Transportation Museum | Lansing | Ingham | Central Michigan | Automotive | Oldsmobiles dating from 1897 to 2004, automobilia, REO Motor Car Company vehicles |
| Richard and Jane Manoogian Mackinac Art Museum | Mackinac Island | Mackinac | Northern Michigan | Art | Mackinac-related art and photography including Native American artifacts and decorative arts, part of Mackinac Island State Park |
| River Of History Museum | Sault Ste. Marie | Chippewa | Upper Peninsula of Michigan | Maritime | website, history of the St. Mary's River and its inhabitants |
| River Raisin National Battlefield Park | Monroe | Monroe | Southeast Michigan | Military | Battle site during the War of 1812 |
| River Rouge Historical Museum | River Rough | Wayne | Southeast Michigan | Local history | website |
| University of Michigan School of Art & Design Galleries | Ann Arbor | Washtenaw | Southeast Michigan | Art | Slusser Gallery on North Campus, Work: Ann Arbor, operated by the Stamps School of Art & Design |
| Rochester Hills Museum at Van Hoosen Farm | Rochester Hills | Oakland | Southeast Michigan | Open-air | website, 16-acre (65,000 m^{2}) museum complex including a 1927 dairy barn with exhibits about area history |
| Rock Harbor Light | Rock Harbor | Keweenaw | Upper Peninsula of Michigan | Maritime | Located in Isle Royale National Park, features maritime displays |
| Rockford Area Museum | Rockford | Kent | West Michigan | Local history | website, operated by the Rockford Area Historical Society |
| Rockland Township Historical Museum | Rockland Township | Ontonagon | Upper Peninsula of Michigan | Local history | |
| Rockwood Area Historical Museum | Rockwood | Wayne | Southeast Michigan | Local history | Operated by the Rockwood Area Historical Society |
| Roethke House | Saginaw | Saginaw | Flint/Tri-Cities | Biographical | website, home of poet Theodore Roethke |
| Romulus Historical Museum | Romulus | Wayne | Southeast Michigan | Local history | |
| Royal Oak Historical Society Museum | Royal Oak | Oakland | Southeast Michigan | Local history | website, housed in old Northwood Fire Station |
| Saarinen House + Gardens | Bloomfield Hills | Oakland | Southeast Michigan | Historic house | website, home and studio designed by Eliel Saarinen, part of the Cranbrook Art Museum |
| Saginaw Art Museum | Saginaw | Saginaw | Flint/Tri-Cities | Art | website, American, European, Asian, Egyptian and local art |
| Saginaw Railway Museum | Saginaw | Saginaw | Flint/Tri-Cities | Railroad | website, operated by the Saginaw Valley Railroad Historical Society, trains, railroad technology, model train exhibit |
| Saginaw Valley Naval Ship Museum | Bay City | Bay | Flint/Tri-Cities | Maritime | U.S. Navy destroyer USS Edson (DD-946) |
| Saginaw Valley State University Art Gallery | University Center | Saginaw | Flint/Tri-Cities | Art | website, located in the Arbury Fine Arts Center, contemporary art |
| Saint Joseph Mercy Health Exploration Station | Canton | Wayne | Southeast Michigan | Medical | website, health education learning center, open for individuals and families to tour the exhibit gallery on the fourth Thursday of each month |
| Saline Depot Museum | Saline | Washtenaw | Southeast Michigan | Railroad | website, operated by the Saline Historical Society |
| Samuel Adams Historical Museum | Huron Township | Wayne | Southeast Michigan | Local history | Operated by the Huron Township Historical Society |
| Samuel Kingsley House | Romulus | Wayne | Southeast Michigan | Historic house | 1855 house, stop along the Underground Railroad |
| Sand Point Light | Escanaba | Delta | Upper Peninsula of Michigan | Lighthouse | Operated by the Delta County Historical Society |
| Sandcastles Children's Museum | Ludington | Mason | Northern Michigan | Children's | website |
| Sanilac County Historic Village and Museum | Port Sanilac | Sanilac | Flint/Tri-Cities | Open-air | website, eight historic buildings on a 10-acre (40,000 m^{2}) campus including a 20-room Victorian mansion, 1900 general store, one-room schoolhouse, 1883 log cabin, barn theater, marine shipwreck room, dairy industry museum, carriages, military and Native American exhibits |
| Saugatuck Center for the Arts | Saugatuck | Allegan | West Michigan | Art | website, performing and visual arts center |
| Saugatuck-Douglas Historical Museum | Douglas | Allegan | West Michigan | Local history | website, operated by the Saugatuck-Douglas Historical Society, also the 1866 Old School House |
| Scarab Club | Detroit | Wayne | Southeast Michigan | Art | Artists' club, gallery, and studio |
| (SCENE) Metrospace | East Lansing | Ingham | Central Michigan | Art | Alternative arts center |
| Schoolcraft County Museum | Manistique | Schoolcraft | Upper Peninsula of Michigan | Local history | Operated by the Schoolcraft County Historical Society |
| Schmaltz Geology Museum and Dinosaur Park | Kalamazoo | Kalamazoo | West Michigan | Natural History (geology and fossils) | Part of Western Michigan University |
| Sebewaing Township Hall | Sebewaing | Huron | Flint/Tri-Cities | Local history | Operated by the Sebewaing Area Historical Society; also operates the Charles W. Liken House Museum |
| Selfridge Military Air Museum | Selfridge Air National Guard Base | Macomb | Southeast Michigan | Transportation - Aviation | Operated by the Michigan Air Guard Historical Association, over 15 historic planes and exhibits |
| Selinsky-Green Farmhouse Museum | Saint Clair Shores | Macomb | Southeast Michigan | Historic house | website, late 19th-century period immigrant's house, located behind the St. Clair Shores Public Library, operated by the St. Clair Shores Historical Commission |
| Seul Choix Point Light and Museum | Gulliver | Schoolcraft | Upper Peninsula of Michigan | Lighthouse | Operated by the Gulliver Historical Society |
| Shiawassee Arts Center | Owosso | Shiawassee | Central Michigan | Art | website |
| Shiawassee County Historical Society | Owosso | Shiawassee | Central Michigan | Local history | website |
| Shrine of the Pines | Baldwin | Lake | Northern Michigan | Decorative arts | Rustic pine furniture, also known as the Log Hunting Lodge Museum |
| Siegfried H. Horn Archaeological Museum | Berrien Springs | Berrien | West Michigan | Archaeology | website, part of Andrews University, also known as Horn Archaeological Museum, ancient Near-Eastern artifacts, including coins, pottery, sculptures, tools, weapons, figurines, jewelry, seals and glass vessels |
| Sindecuse Museum of Dentistry | Ann Arbor | Washtenaw | Southeast Michigan | Medical | Part of the University of Michigan School of Dentistry; dental practice and technology in the United States and Michigan from the 18th century to today |
| Sleeping Bear Point Coast Guard Station Maritime Museum | Glen Haven | Leelanau | Northern Michigan | Maritime | Part of Sleeping Bear Dunes National Lakeshore; Coast Guard and lifesaving history and equipment |
| Sloan Museum | Flint | Genesee | Flint/Tri-Cities | Multiple | Regional history, historic automobiles, hands-on science, Longway Planetarium |
| Southern Michigan Railroad Museum | Clinton | Lenawee | Southeast Michigan | Railroad | Heritage railroad and museum |
| South Manitou Island Lighthouse | South Manitou Island | Leelanau | Northern Michigan | Lighthouse | Operated by the Manitou Island Lighthouse Society |
| Southgate Museum | Southgate | Wayne | Southeast Michigan | Local history | Operated by the Southgate Historical Foundation in the Grahl House |
| Spirit of the Woods Museum | Elk Rapid | Antrim | Northern Michigan | Multiple | website, dioramas of native Michigan animals, Native American artifacts |
| SS City of Milwaukee | Manistee | Manistee | Northern Michigan | Museum ship | Great Lakes railroad car ferry |
| St. Clair County Farm Museum | Goodells | St. Clair | Southeast Michigan | Agriculture | website, collection of farm equipment |
| St. Clair Historical Museum | St. Clair | St. Clair | Southeast Michigan | Local history | website |
| St. Mary's Historical Museum | Ruth | Huron | Flint/Tri-Cities | Historic house | Polish settler log cabin, open by appointment |
| St. Mary's Preparatory Museums | Orchard Lake | Oakland | Southeast Michigan | Multiple | Includes nine small museums of Polish military and political history, gallery of Polish art |
| Standish Depot Museum | Standish | Arenac | Flint/Tri-Cities | Railroad | Stone Detroit and Mackinac Railway Station, including rolling stock, antique British passenger cars, houses area visitor center |
| Steam Railroading Institute | Owosso | Shiawassee | Central Michigan | Railroad | Heritage railroad with steam and diesel locomotives, freight and other cars |
| Stearns Collection of Musical Instruments | Ann Arbor | Washtenaw | Southeast Michigan | Music | Part of the University of Michigan, over 2500 pieces of historical and contemporary musical instruments from all over the world |
| Steiner Museum | Fairview | Oscoda | Northern Michigan | Industry - Logging | Logging and pioneering history and artifacts |
| Stockton Center at Spring Grove | Flint | Genesee | Flint/Tri-Cities | Historic house | website |
| Straight Farmhouse | Garden City | Wayne | Southeast Michigan | Local history | website, home of the Garden City Historical Museum |
| Stuart House Museum | Mackinac Island | Mackinac | Northern Michigan | Local history | |
| Sturgeon Point Light House and Museum | Harrisville | Alcona | Northern Michigan | Lighthouse | Operated by the Alcona Historical Society; on the grounds is the Old Bailey School, a 1907 One-room school house, which was moved there from Mikado, Michigan in 1998. |
| Tahquamenon Logging Museum | Newberry | Luce | Upper Peninsula of Michigan | Industry - Logging | website, Michigan's early logging industry, includes a cook shack, original C.C.C. building, open seasonally |
| Taylor Veterans Museum | Taylor | Wayne | Southeast Michigan | Military | Located inside Taylor City Hall |
| Tawas Point Light | East Tawas | Iosco | Northern Michigan | Lighthouse | Located in Tawas Point State Park |
| Tecumseh Area Historical Museum | Tecumseh | Lenawee | Southeast Michigan | Local history | History of the communities around Tecumseh, including Macon, Ridgeway, Tipton and Britton |
| Ten Cent Barn Museum | Ubly | Huron | Flint/Tri-Cities | Local history | website, operated by the Ubly Area Historical Society |
| Thomas Edison Depot Museum | Port Huron | St. Clair | Southeast Michigan | Biographical | Owned and operated by the Port Huron Museum, life of Thomas Edison |
| Three Oaks Bicycle Museum | Three Oaks | Berrien | West Michigan | Transportation | |
| Thumb Octagon Barn Agricultural Museum | Gagetown | Tuscola | Flint/Tri-Cities | Agriculture | website, agriculture tools, equipment, buildings |
| Tompkins Historical Society Museum | Rives Junction | Jackson | Central Michigan | Local history | website |
| Top of the Lake Snowmobile Museum | Naubinway | Mackinac | Upper Peninsula of Michigan | Sports | website, antique and vintage snowmobiles |
| Totem Village Museum | St. Ignace | Mackinac | Upper Peninsula of Michigan | Native American | Collection of totem poles and lumbering artifacts in a gift shop |
| Tower of History | Sault Ste. Marie | Chippewa | Upper Peninsula of Michigan | Local history | website, observation tower and exhibits of early Missionaries, local & Native American history |
| Travelers Club International Restaurant & Tuba Museum | Okemos | Ingham | Central Michigan | Music | website, restaurant and collection of tubas, sousaphones, French horns |
| Trenton Historical Museum | Trenton | Wayne | Southeast Michigan | Local history | website, operated by the Trenton Historical Commission, Victorian house with local history artifacts |
| Tri-Cities Historical Museum | Grand Haven | Ottawa | West Michigan | Local history | website, exhibits include Native Americans, early pioneers, lumberjacks, French voyageurs, Victorian period rooms, medicine, agriculture, lumbering, maritime, tourism |
| Troy Historic Village | Troy | Oakland | Southeast Michigan | Open-air | Ten historic buildings on a village green, museum of local history |
| Turner-Dodge House | Lansing | Ingham | Central Michigan | Historic house | Mansion operated by the city |
| Tuskegee Airmen National Museum | Detroit | Wayne | Southeast Michigan | Military | website, located at Fort Wayne, history of blacks in aviation in World War II up until the integration of the Armed Forces, open by appointment |
| Ukrainian American Archives and Museum of Detroit | Hamtramck | Wayne | Southeast Michigan | Ethnic | Ukrainian culture, art and contributions to the United States |
| University Art Gallery CMU | Mount Pleasant | Isabella | Central Michigan | Art | website, part of Central Michigan University |
| University of Michigan Museum of Art | Ann Arbor | Washtenaw | Southeast Michigan | Art | Features European and Asian art, including some by Pablo Picasso, Helen Frankenthaler, and James McNeill Whistler. Outdoor sculptures include Orion and Daedalus. |
| University of Michigan Museum of Natural History | Ann Arbor | Washtenaw | Southeast Michigan | Natural history | Part of the University of Michigan, dinosaur exhibits, Michigan wildlife, anthropology, geology and a planetarium. University of Michigan research museums: Museum of Anthropology, Museum of Paleontology, Museum of Zoology, University Herbarium |
| Upper Peninsula Children's Museum | Marquette | Marquette | Upper Peninsula of Michigan | Children's | website |
| Upper Peninsula Firefighters Memorial Museum | Calumet | Houghton | Upper Peninsula of Michigan | Firefighting | Participating institution in Keweenaw National Historical Park |
| U.P. Steam & Gas Engine Antique Village & Agriculture Museum | Escanaba | Delta | Upper Peninsula of Michigan | Technology | website, operated by the U.P. Steam and Gas Engine Association, antique agriculture equipment and artifacts |
| Urban Institute for Contemporary Arts | Grand Rapids | Kent | West Michigan | Art | website |
| USCGC Bramble (WLB-392) | Port Huron | St. Clair | Southeast Michigan | Museum ship | 180-foot (55 m) seagoing buoy tender |
| USCGC Acacia | Manistee | Manistee | Northern Michigan | Museum ship | USCG seagoing buoy tender |
| USS LST 393 Veterans Museum | Muskegon | Muskegon | West Michigan | Museum ship | LST-1-class tank landing ship built for the United States Navy during World War II |
| USS Silversides Submarine Museum | Muskegon | Muskegon | West Michigan | Maritime | Includes the museum, USS Silversides (SS-236) submarine and USS McLane Coast Guard cutter; formerly known as the Great Lakes Naval Memorial & Museum |
| U.S. National Ski and Snowboard Hall of Fame and Museum | Ishpeming | Marquette | Upper Peninsula of Michigan | Hall of fame - Sports | |
| Van Buren Historical Society Museum | Hartford | Van Buren | West Michigan | Local history | |
| Vicksburg Historic Village | Vicksburg | Kalamazoo | West Michigan | Open-air | website, operated by the Vicksburg Historical Society, includes the Vicksburg Depot Museum with railroad cars and equipment, a print shop, school house, express office, farm house and barn |
| Voigt House Victorian Museum | Grand Rapids | Kent | West Michigan | Historic house | Victorian period house, operated by the Grand Rapids Public Museum |
| Wakefield Historical Society Museum | Wakefield | Gogebic | Upper Peninsula of Michigan | Local history | |
| Walker Tavern | Brooklyn | Lenawee | Southeast Michigan | History | Exhibits focus on Michigan's frontier settlement and stagecoach eras during the first half of the 19th century |
| Waterloo Farm Museum | Waterloo | Jackson | Central Michigan | Agriculture | website, operated by the Waterloo Historical Society, includes 10 room farmhouse and many outbuildings, also nearby Dewey School, a one-room schoolhouse |
| Water Street Historic Block | Sault Ste. Marie | Chippewa | Upper Peninsula of Michigan | Historic houses | website, cooperative effort between the Chippewa County Historical Society, Sault Historic Sites, & the City of Sault Ste. Marie; includes Johnston House & Henry Rowe Schoolcraft office |
| Wayne Historical Museum | Wayne | Wayne | Southeast Michigan | Local history | website |
| Webster Township Museum | Webster Township | Washtenaw | Southeast Michigan | Open-air | Operated by the Webster Township Historical Society, complex includes Town Hall, school, blacksmith shop |
| W.K. Kellogg Manor House | Gull Lake | Barry | West Michigan | Historic house | Part of Kellogg Biological Station, 32-acre (130,000 m^{2}) estate includes a Tudor Revival house, carriage house, chauffeur's cottage, boathouse, Dutch windmill, lakeside pagoda and several gardens |
| Wellington Farm Park | Grayling | Crawford | Northern Michigan | Open-air | website, rural mid-America during the Great Depression |
| Westland Historical Park | Westland | Wayne | Southeast Michigan | Historic house | website, includes Felton Farmhouse, a typical Michigan farmhouse built in the 1850s and the Collins House, which stores the commission's historical archives |
| West Shore Fishing Museum | Cedar River | Menominee | Upper Peninsula of Michigan | Industry - Fishing | Operated by the Bailey Property Preservation Association |
| Wexford County Historical Museum | Cadillac | Wexford | Northern Michigan | Local history | Located in the former Cadillac Public Library |
| Whaley Historic House Museum | Flint | Genesee | Flint/Tri-Cities | Historic house | website, late Victorian house |
| Wheels of History Museum | Brimley | Chippewa | Upper Peninsula of Michigan | Local history | website, railroads, logging, fishing exhibits, operated by the Bay Mills-Brimley Historical Society |
| Whitefish Point Light | Paradise | Chippewa | Upper Peninsula of Michigan | Lighthouse | Operated by the Great Lakes Shipwreck Historical Society |
| White Pine Village | Ludington | Mason | Northern Michigan | Open-air | Operated by the Mason County Historical Society, 25 buildings |
| White River Light Station Museum | Whitehall | Muskegon | West Michigan | Lighthouse | |
| White Rock School Museum | White Rock | Huron | Flint/Tri-Cities | Local history | website, operated by the White Rock Historical Society |
| William Bonifas Fine Arts Center | Escanaba | Delta | Upper Peninsula of Michigan | Art | website, gallery exhibits, art workshops, classes and theatrical productions |
| William G. Thompson House Museum | Hudson | Lenawee | Southeast Michigan | Historic house | Late 19th-century home of Detroit mayor William G. Thompson, contains Japanese woodblocks, Chinese Jade and hard stone carvings, cloisonné vases, English and Continental art, antique porcelain and glass, |
| William L. Clements Library | Ann Arbor | Washtenaw | Southeast Michigan | History | Part of the University of Michigan, exhibits about American history from the Age of Discovery into the 20th century |
| Wills Ste. Claire Auto Museum | Marysville | St. Clair | Southeast Michigan | Automotive | History of Childe Wills and the Wills Sainte Claire automobile |
| Windmill Island Gardens | Holland | Ottawa | West Michigan | Mill | 240-year-old working Dutch windmill (De Zwaan) on 36 acres (150,000 m^{2}) of gardens; Posthouse Museum is a replica of a 14th-century wayside inn |
| Wing House Museum | Coldwater | Branch | Central Michigan | Historic house | website, late 19th-century period home of the Branch County Historical Society |
| Witch's Hat Depot Museum | South Lyon | Oakland | Southeast Michigan | Open-air | website, local history museum in former train depot, includes caboose, freight house and chapel buildings |
| Wolcott Mill Metropark | Ray Township | Macomb | Southeast Michigan | Agriculture | Park features historic mill, barn museum of agriculture, working farm |
| World War II Glider and Military Museum | Iron Mountain | Dickinson | Upper Peninsula of Michigan | Military | website, operated by the Menominee Range Historical Foundation, features a restored Waco CG-4 glider, military uniforms, World War II photographs, Nazi Germany artifacts, military vehicles |
| Wurtsmith Air Museum | Oscoda | Iosco | Northern Michigan | Aviation | website, located at Oscoda-Wurtsmith Airport, history of Wurtsmith Air Force Base and aviation in NE Michigan |
| Wyandotte Museums | Wyandotte | Wayne | Southeast Michigan | Historic house | Early 20th-century period Ford-MacNichol House, also local history and art exhibits |
| Yankee Air Museum | Ypsilanti | Washtenaw | Southeast Michigan | Aviation | Located at Willow Run Airport |
| Ye Ole Carriage Shop | Spring Arbor | Jackson | Central Michigan | Automotive | website, open by appointment, "Jackson made" automobiles and a large Coca-Cola collection |
| Ypsilanti Automotive Heritage Museum | Ypsilanti | Washtenaw | Southeast Michigan | Automotive | Production cars from the Willow Run Plant and Hudson Motors |
| Ypsilanti Historical Museum | Ypsilanti | Washtenaw | Southeast Michigan | Local history | Home of the Ypsilanti Historical Society, 1860 house with period rooms and local history exhibits |
| Ziibiwing Center of Anishinabe Culture & Lifeways | Mount Pleasant | Isabella | Central Michigan | Native American | website |

== Defunct museums ==
- Alamo Township Museum, Alamo Township - Closed 2021
- AutoWorld, Flint
- Anonkas Witch Museum, Caro
- Basement 414, Lansing, closed in 2012
- Cereal City, Battle Creek, closed January 2007
- Detroit Children's Museum, Detroit, closed in 2012
- Detroit Science Center, closed in fall of 2011. The Michigan Science Center opened in 2012 in the same facility
- Fred Bear Museum, Grayling, largest private collection of archery artifacts in the world. Moved to Florida in 1985 & closed in 2003
- Father Marquette National Memorial, museum building destroyed in 2000, features national memorial and a 15-station outdoor interpretive trail
- Keewatin Maritime Museum, 1907 Edwardian steamship, moved to Port McNicoll, Ontario in 2012
- Kresge Art Museum, East Lansing, now the Eli and Edythe Broad Art Museum at Michigan State University
- Labor Museum & Learning Center, Flint
- Lund's Scenic Garden, Maple City, Michigan, closed in November, 1987
- Michigan Museum of Surveying, Lansing, moved to Springfield, Illinois in 2007 to become the National Museum of Surveying & closed in 2013
- Minibeast Zooseum and Education Center, Lansing
- Walter P. Chrysler Museum, Auburn Hills, closed in 2012
- Weird Michigan Wax Museum, Moran Township

== Regions ==
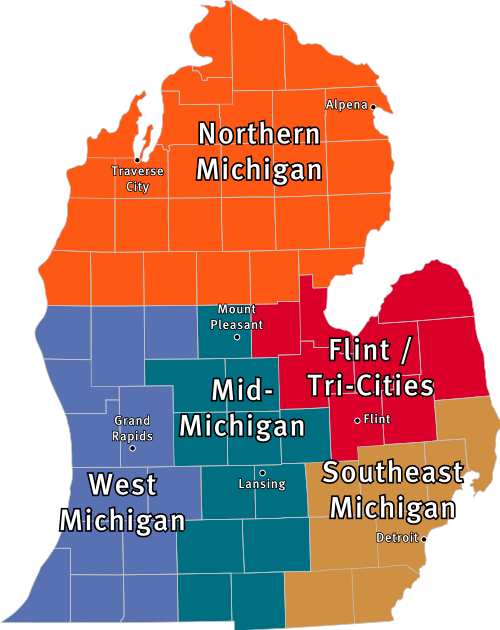
Regions of the Lower Peninsula of Michigan

Regions of the Upper Peninsula of Michigan

Michigan's main regions:

- Central Michigan
- Flint/Tri-Cities
  - The Thumb, a subregion of the Flint/Tri-Cities area
  - Greater Tri Cities
- Northern Michigan
- Southeast Michigan / Metro Detroit
- West Michigan including Michiana
- Upper Peninsula of Michigan

== See also ==
- Arboreta in Michigan (category)
- Aquaria in Michigan (category)
- Botanical gardens in Michigan (category)
- Historic landmarks in Michigan
- Houses in Michigan (category)
- Forts in Michigan (category)
- Museums list
- List of historical societies in Michigan
- Nature Centers in Michigan
- Observatories in Michigan (category)
- Registered Historic Places in Michigan

== Resources ==
- Michigan Travel & Tourism: Museums
- Michigan Museums Association
- Motor Cities National Heritage Area
- Northeast Michigan Online, Museums
- Hunt's Guide to the Upper Peninsula
