= Peppermint Creek Theatre Company =

Theater company in Lansing, Michigan

Peppermint Creek Theatre Company is a theater company in East Lansing, Michigan.

Founded in 1995 in Mason, Michigan as the Peppermint Creek Players, the company initially performed one play a summer in Mount Hope Presbyterian Church. The company is named after the creek that runs near founder Chad Badgero's childhood home in Mason. For their third production, they moved to the MSU Gardens Conservatory.

Peppermint Creek Theatre Company has performed at the Basement 414 and Creole Art Gallery, Lansing art galleries., Mount Hope Presbyterian Church, Woldumar Nature Center, MSU Auditorium Rm 49, MSU Greenhouses, and currently at the Miller Performing Arts Center.
