= Holland Museum =

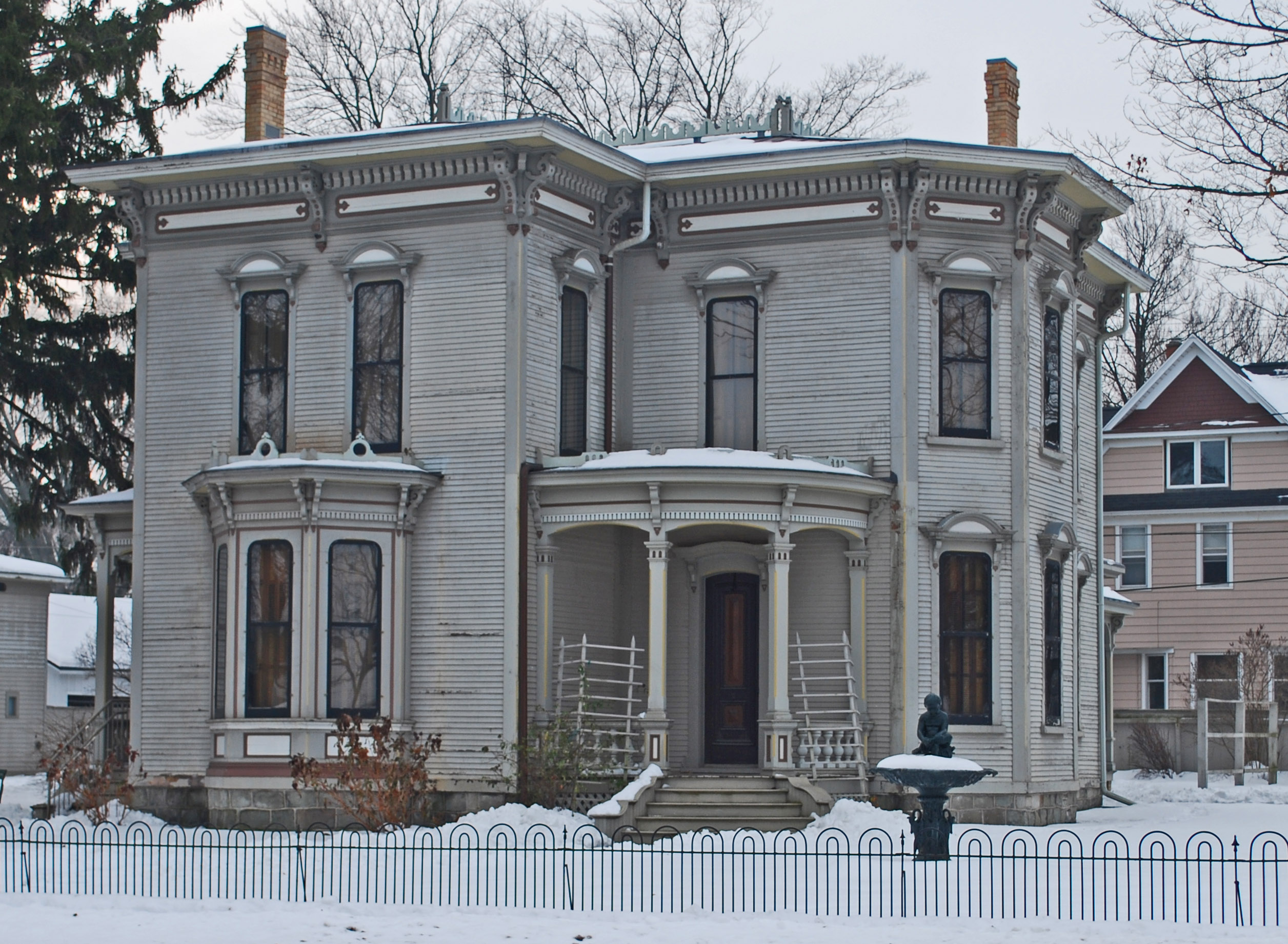
- Isaac Cappon House, operated by the Holland Museum
- Established: 1897
- Location: Holland, Michigan
- Coordinates: 42.78864°N 86.10872°W
- Type: History museum
- Public transit access: MAX
- Website: www.hollandmuseum.org

Holland Museum in Holland, Michigan is a local historical museum. Located in a landmark, neo-classical former Post Office building next to Centennial Park. The Holland Museum also operates two historic house museums: the Cappon House and the Settlers House museums.

The Holland Museum features, on its main floor, permanent exhibits on Holland's history "From Settlement to City," reflecting Holland's diverse history and multi-ethnic population. Temporary and traveling exhibits are shown in the Wichers Gallery. The new Dutch Galleries, encompassing the second floor, feature 600 years of Dutch art and culture: 17th-19th-century paintings, fine furniture, delftware, silver and original Dutch costumes. The Archives and Research Library on the lower level houses the museum's collection of books, papers and photographs related to Holland's history.

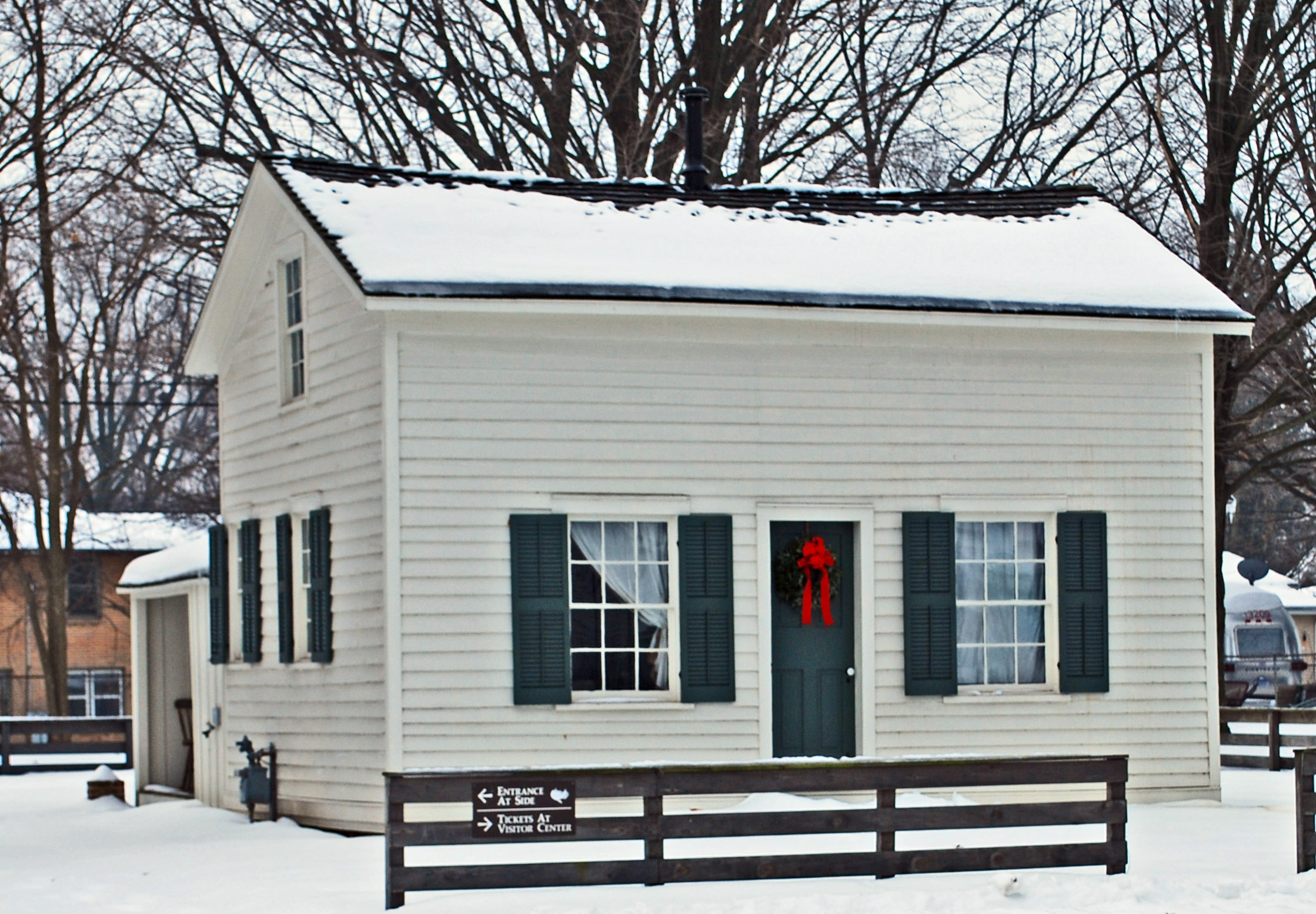
Thomas and Anna Morrissey House, known as the Settlers House

The Cappon House and Settlers House, a few blocks to the west, tell the story of Holland's early settlers with the beautifully preserved and restored living environments of Holland's first mayor and a common worker's family.
