= Pioneer Log Cabin Museum =

Historical log cabin and museum in Cassopolis, Michigan, USA

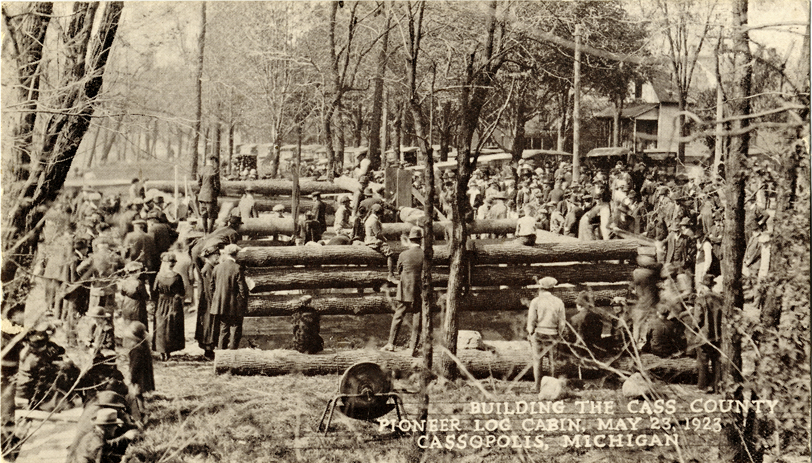
- Men building the cabin, May 1923
- Established: June 18, 1924; 102 years ago
- Location: Cassopolis, Cass County, Michigan
- Coordinates: 41.9065°N 86.0126°W
- Type: Historical log cabin
- Founder: Charles Harmon
- Website: Official website

The Cass County Pioneer Log Cabin Museum is a historical log cabin and local history museum located in Cassopolis, Michigan on Stone Lake. Built in 1923 as a temporary structure for a town picnic, the cabin is now home to a variety of furniture, toys, and tools that illustrate what life was like in the 1800s.

== Overview ==
Attorney Charles Harmon, then Secretary of the Cass County Pioneer Society, originally conceived the idea of the cabin as a place to hold the Pioneer Day Picnic. The logs used were donated by locals from their properties; each of the 144 logs was numbered. This number corresponds with a list detailing the family name, town, and the type of tree the log came from. Construction began on May 23 with a crew of 46 and the cabin was dedicated on Pioneer Day, June 20.

Members of the community made furniture and donated items to furnish the log cabin. Andirons, crane and lug hooks were donated for the fireplace. A museum collection located in the lobby of the court house was moved to the log cabin and incorporated into the display there. The museum opened on June 17, 1924. To pay off the debt for its establishment, Charles Harmon sold 1 by 3 foot "lots" on the cabin grounds for one dollar each (equivalent to $19.00 today). The lots were then donated back to the Pioneer Society. In 1972-1973, an addition was built on the rear of cabin to provide more display space.

The museum is open every Sunday between Memorial Day and Labor Day. It opens for special events throughout the rest of the year. The museum contains old tools, household items, dollhouses, and Civil War memorabilia, as well as a collection of stuffed birds from the 1860s, including the now-extinct passenger pigeon. It is free to enter and is supported by donations, the gift shop, the local Chamber of Commerce, and the local government.
