= Roethke Houses =

- U.S. National Register of Historic Places
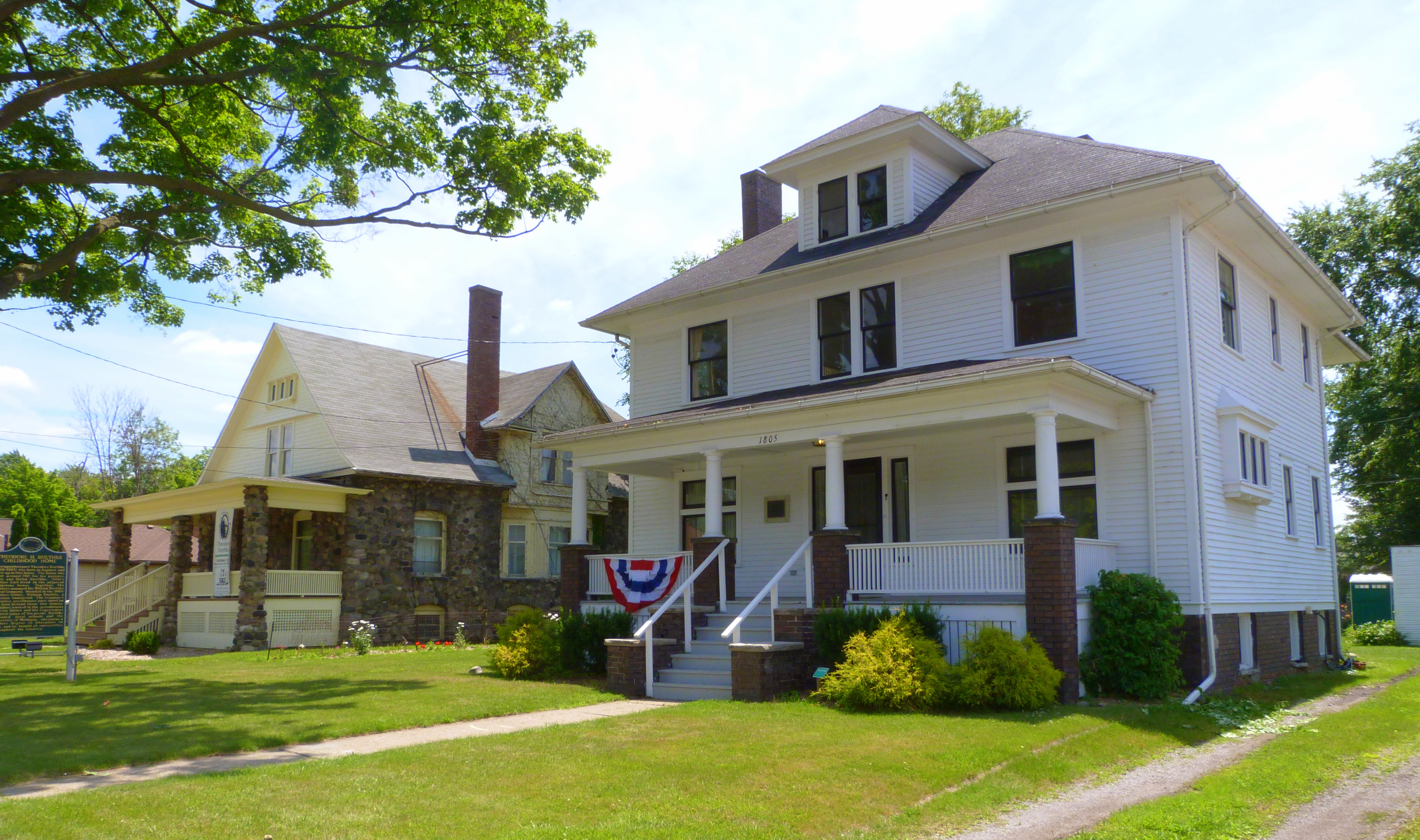
- Carl (left) and Otto Roethke houses

- Location within Michigan Location within the United States
- Interactive map
- Location: 1759 and 1805 Gratiot Ave., Saginaw, Michigan
- Coordinates: 43°25′00″N 83°59′14″W
- Area: 0.6 acres (0.24 ha)
- Built: 1904
- Architectural style: Shingle Style, Colonial Revival, Foursquare
- NRHP reference No.: 00001485
- Added to NRHP: June 8, 2001

The Roethke Houses are two side-by-side single family homes located at 1759 and 1805 Gratiot Avenue in Saginaw, Michigan. They were listed on the National Register of Historic Places in 2001.

== History ==
In the mid-1800s, Wilhelm Roethke served as the head forester on the estate of Otto von Bismarck's sister in Pomerania. He resigned in 1870 and move to Berlin, where he established a flower shop. In 1872 or 1873 he emigrated to the United States, along with his wife Bertha and their three sons, Emil, Carl, and Otto. Roethke settled in Saginaw, where he opened a market garden and florist shop. In 1882, he purchased the 20-acre parcel where these houses now stand, and constructed a series of greenhouses to support the business. By 1901, the business was much expanded, and Carl and Otto were running it. The entire family lived together on their property.

In 1904, Carl Roethke constructed a fieldstone-walled house (now 1759 Gratiot) near the greenhouses and moved into it with his family. Otto Roethke followed suit in 1911, constructing a hip-roof Colonial house (now 1805 Gratiot) for his family next to his brother's house. The elder Roethke died in 1911, leaving the florist business to Otto and Carl. By this time it was a large operation, employing 25 people. The brothers ran it until 1922, when Otto's heath began to fail. Carl bought out his brother, but died himself the next year, leaving his widow Margaret to run the business. The firm lasted into the 21st century.

The Otto Roethke house at 1801 Gratiot is particularly notable as the childhood home of Otto's son, poet Theodore Roethke. He lived in the house from 1911, when it was constructed, until he entered the University of Michigan in 1925.

== Description ==
The Roethke Houses are located side by side at 1759 and 1805 Gratiot Avenue, respectively.

=== Carl Roethke House ===
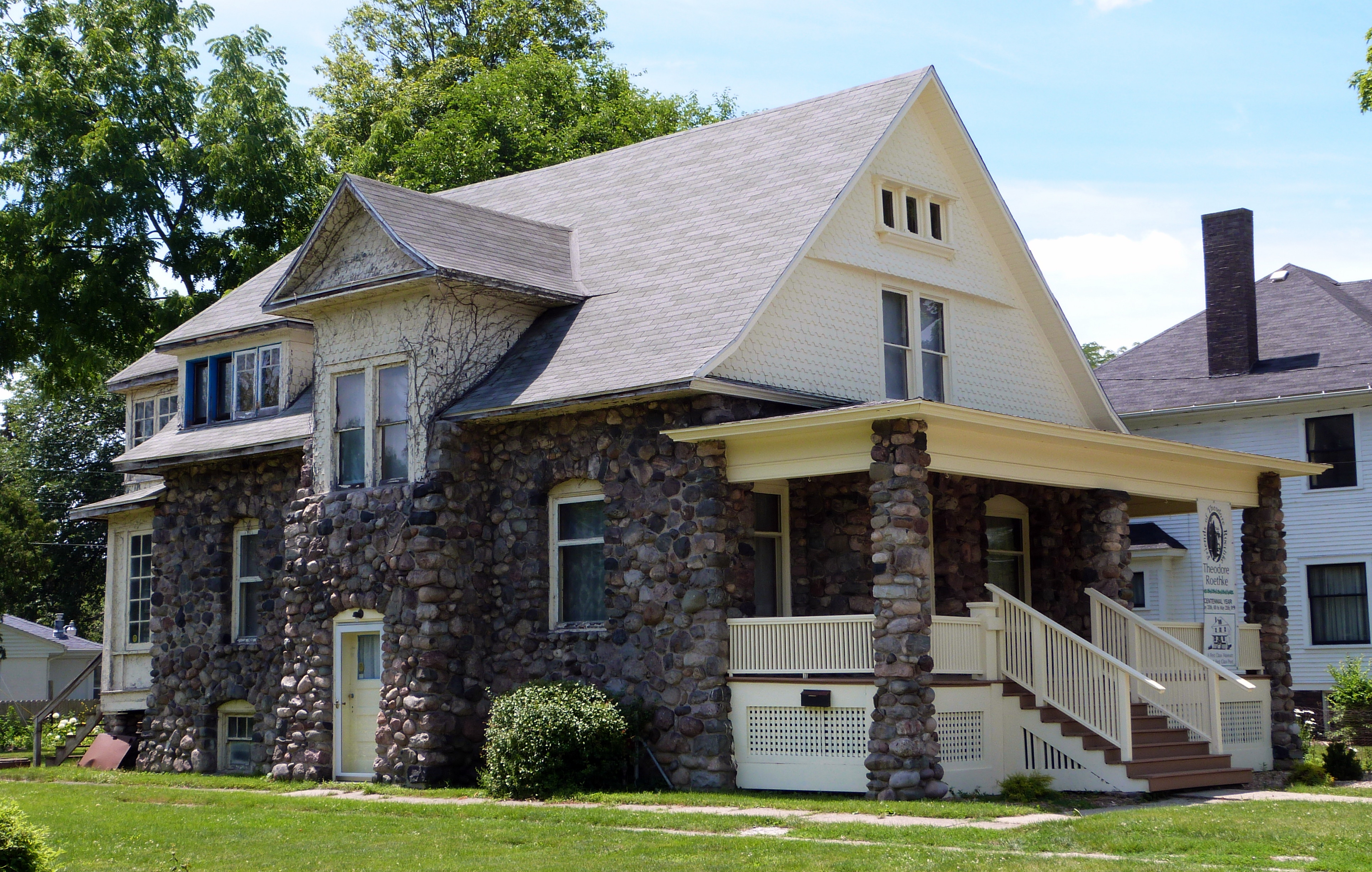
Carl Roethke House

The Carl Roethke House is a one-and-one-half-story gable-front building. The first floor is covered with uncoursed cobblestones; the gables on the second story are covered with patterned wood shingles. The house has two porches: one at the front and one at the rear. A gable dormer with flaring eaves is located on the west slope of the roof, with a three-sided bay window projecting below on the house's first floor. On the east side is a two-story bay, with a gable roof with flaring eaves above and an entrance on the first floor below.

The windows inf the house are asymmetrically placed. On the first floor, the windows and doors are set in segmentally arched frames. On the second floor, a row of three, single-pane windows separated by Tuscan columns is located in the peak of the front gable, above a pair of double-hung, one-over-one windows. Four multi-light windows in a small dormer are behind the gable roof of the two-story bay.

=== Otto Roethke House ===
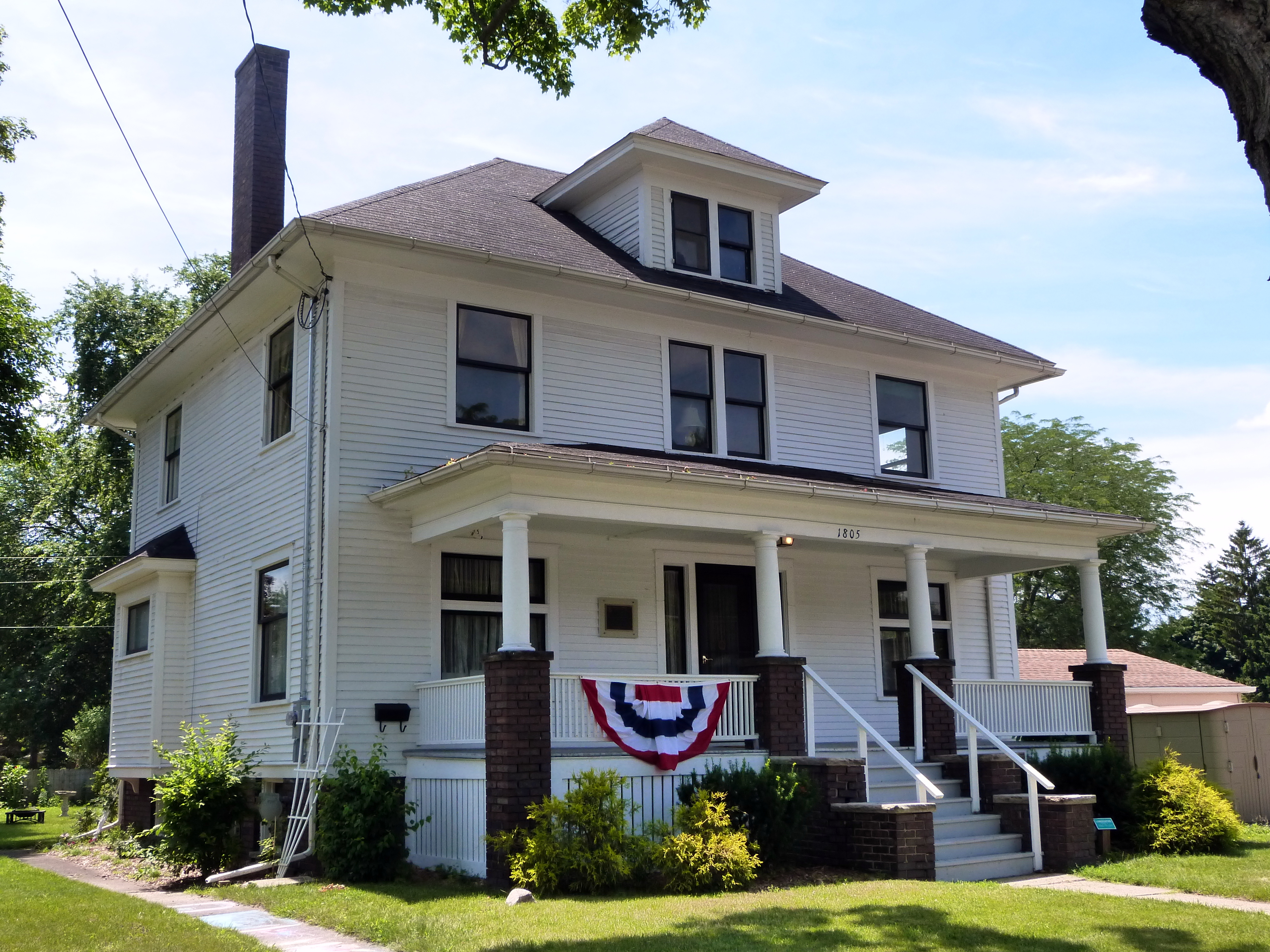
Otto Roethke House

The Otto Roethke House is a two-story hip-roof Colonial Revival structure with symmetrical, central entrance facade and clapboarded-covered walls. It has wide boxed eaves and a brick-clad foundation. On the front facade, a single hipped-roof dormer is located in the center of the roof. A porch on the first floor with Tuscan columns runs almost the entire width of the house. At the rear is a two-story enclosed porch topped with a hip roof. The overhanging second story of the porch is supported by three thin metal posts. The windows in the house are all single or paired one-over-one rectangular units, save for three single-light windows set in a small bay on one side of the house.
