= Elk Rapids First Methodist Episcopal Church =

Historic church in Michigan, United States

- U.S. National Register of Historic Places
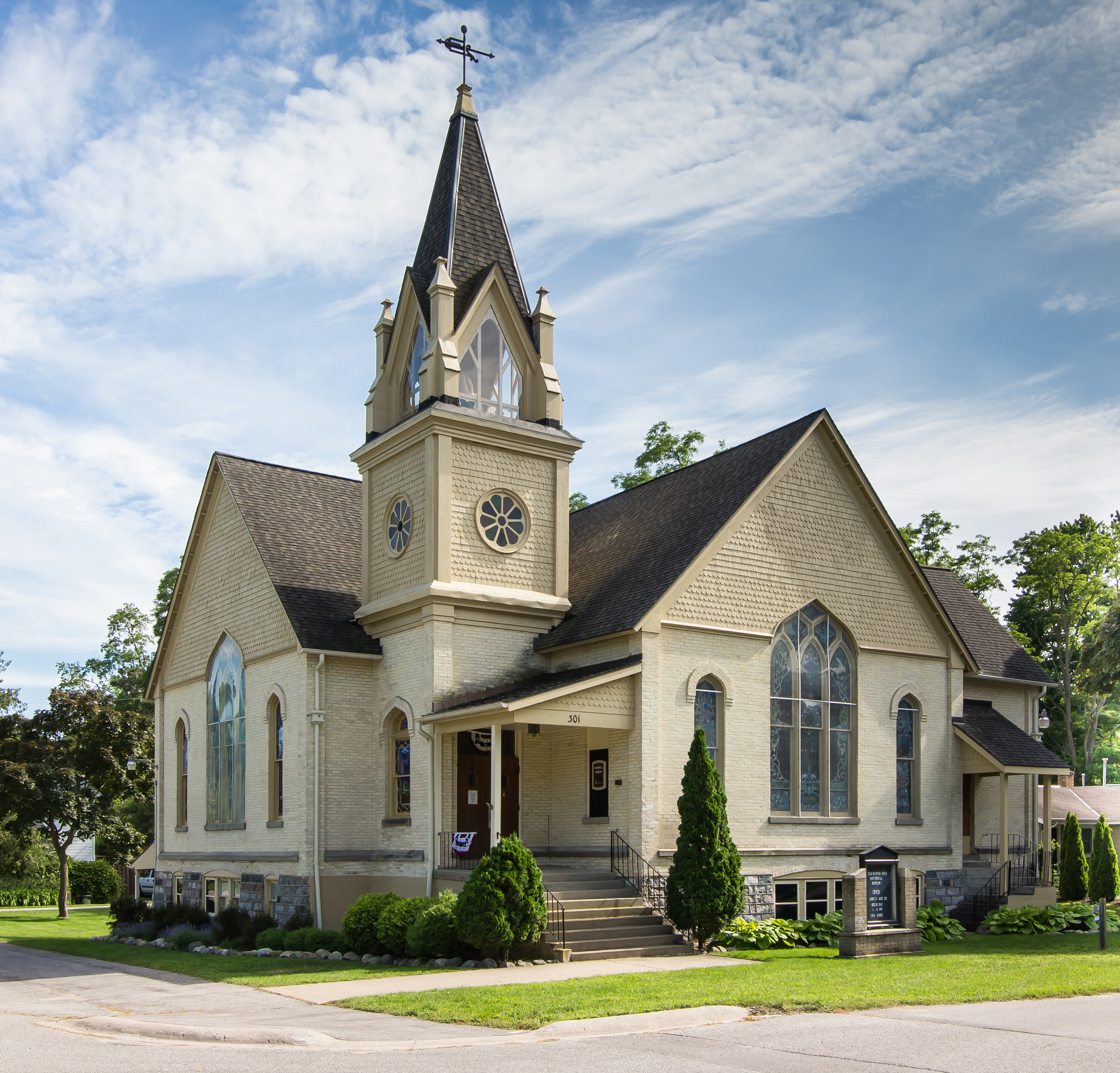

- Location within Michigan Location within the United States
- Interactive map
- Location: 301 Traverse St. Elk Rapids, Michigan
- Coordinates: 44°53′48″N 85°24′56″W
- Built: 1901
- Architect: Benjamin D. Price, Max C. Price
- Architectural style: Gothic-inspired Auditorium Church
- NRHP reference No.: 15000945
- Added to NRHP: December 29, 2015

The Elk Rapids First Methodist Episcopal Church is a former church located at 301 Traverse Street in Elk Rapids, Michigan. The building now houses Elk Rapids Area Historical Museum. It was listed on the National Register of Historic Places in 2015.

== History ==
The newly minted Methodist minister Reverend David R. Latham first visited Elk Rapids on June 21, 1857. He had intended to travel to Kansas, but was convinced to stay in the area. He soon was appointed to a preaching circuit that included Elk Rapids and other nearby towns. There were soon enough Methodists in Elk Rapids to establish a congregation, and the First Methodist Episcopal Church of Elk Rapids was formed in the early 1870s. In 1876, the congregation purchased a former schoolhouse for use as a church. In 1882, they moved to the former courthouse.

However, the church soon outgrew their quarters, and in 1901 they purchased the site for this building and began construction. The church was completed in 1902 at a cost of about $8500. The congregation continued to use the building until 2011, when the church was discontinued. The building was donated to the Elk Rapids Area Historical Society, who renovated the structure. It now serves as that group's headquarters and historical museum.

== Description ==
The former Elk Rapids First Methodist Episcopal Church is a brick and wood cross-gable-roof building faced in locally produced pale yellow brick, and standing on a foundation of rock-faced fieldstone. The gabled areas are faced with wood shingles. It has a single main story above a half-buried basement. The church is basically square in plan, with two short projecting wings. A square-plan tower containing the main entrance is located in the northeast corner between the wings, and projects nearly full depth from the front walls. The tower is topped with an open gabled belfry and a tall spire. The main entry has a large wood double door, reached by a flight of stairs. Three more entrances are paced around the building.

An important characteristic of the building is the distinctive Gothic-arch windows, placed in a variety of shapes and sizes. The main facades each have a broad three-part central Gothic window, with a single narrow Gothic window to each side. A third elevation has another three-part Gothic window with two single, separate, narrow Gothic windows to one side, and the remaining facade has three single narrow Gothic windows. The tower also has one window. Thirteen of the windows contain stained glass, eight of which are original to the initial construction of the building. The stained glass windows have pointed arch tops with wood molding. The eight windows depict dove, fleur-de-lis, water lily and other flower designs, crowns, crosses, bibles, oil lamps and other Christian symbols. The five windows installed at later dates (1948, 1949, 1952, 1977, and 1980) contain more depictions of religious scenes, including two modeled after paintings by German artist Johann Heinrich Hoffmann.

The main entrance leads to an entry vestibule and on into the main auditorium. The auditorium has an inclined floor leading toward the stage that once contained the pulpit and altar. Pews once ringed the auditorium, set in a semi-circle, but only one section of pews has been retained. The interior walls are of painted plaster over the exterior masonry. The ceiling above is covered with decorative pressed metal paneling. An opening off the auditorium leads to a front room, now used as a welcoming/meeting area. A stairway from the main level leads downward, where there is a large meeting space, and a smaller room housing mechanicals.
