= Byron Area Historic Museum =

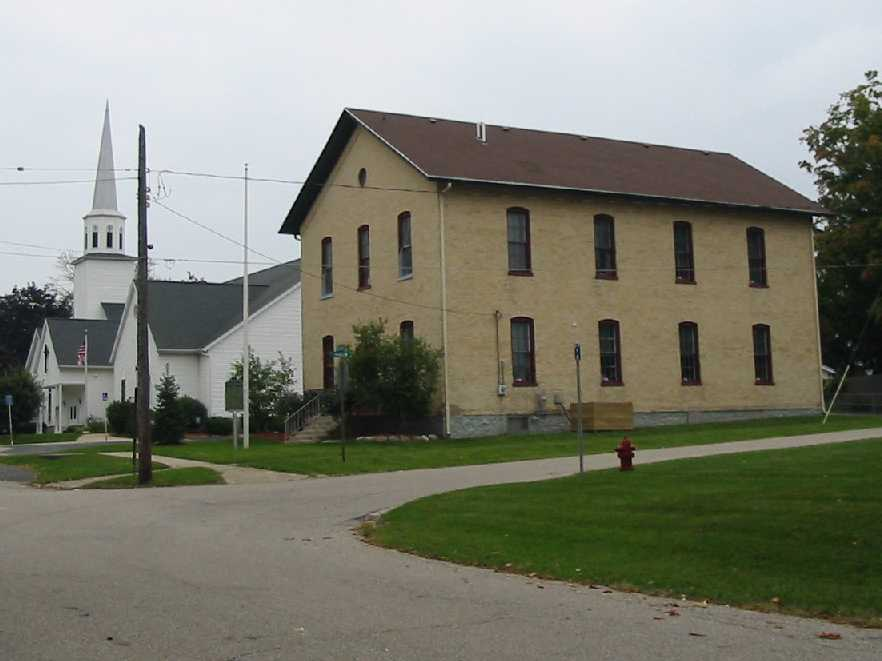
- Byron City Township Hall was built in 1875
- Established: 1978
- Location: Byron Center, Michigan
- Coordinates: 42.81095°N 85.72561°W
- Type: History museum
- Website: www.byroncenterhistory.com

Byron Area Historic Museum is a museum in Byron Center, Michigan, United States. The Byron Center Historical Society is a non profit organization and was originally formed in 1978 primarily for Genealogy research. In 1986 The Historical Society obtained the “Township Hall”, a State Historical Landmark, to utilize for a museum and to house the genealogy archives. Exhibits include period business displays including a general store, post office, doctor's office, a period house with different rooms, displays on logging and farming, area veterans, a church and a one-room schoolhouse.

Downstairs: General Store; Post Office; Doctor's Office; Large Farming Display; Logging Display
