= Waterloo Farm Museum =

- Siebold Farm/Ruehle (Realy) Farm
- U.S. National Register of Historic Places
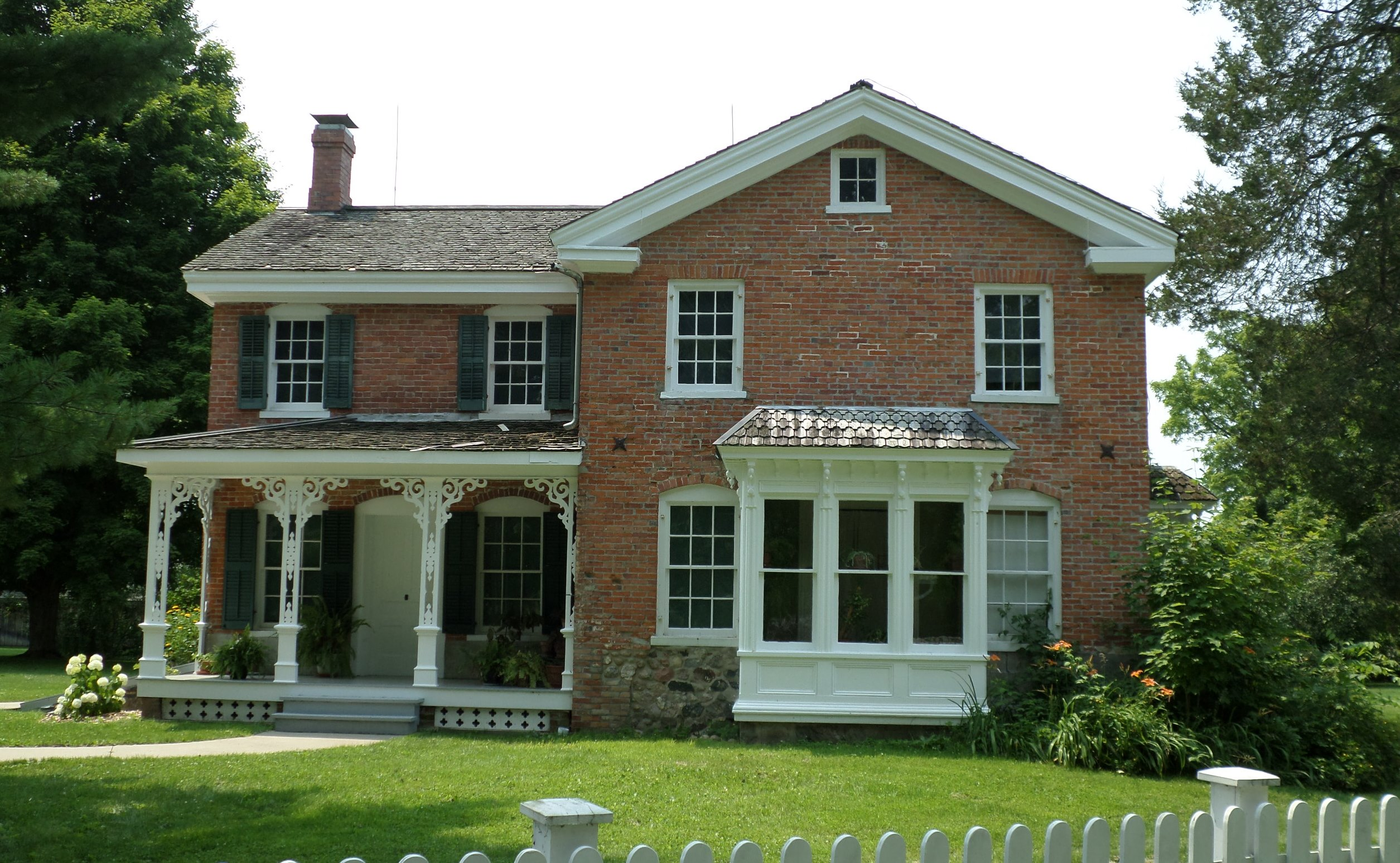
- Interactive map
- Location: 9998 Waterloo-Munith Rd., Waterloo Township, Michigan
- Coordinates: 42°22′46″N 84°10′48″W
- Area: 3 acres (1.2 ha)
- Built: 1855
- NRHP reference No.: 73000952
- Added to NRHP: March 30, 1973

The Waterloo Farm Museum is a museum located at 9998 Waterloo-Munith Road in Waterloo Township, Michigan. It was originally the Siebold Farm and then the Realy Farm. The farm was listed on the National Register of Historic Places in 1973.

== History ==
In 1844, Johannes Siebold emigrated to the United States from the town of Endersbach in Germany, along with his new wife Fredrika and her two children by an earlier marriage, Johannes Jacob and Katrinka Ruehle. The family briefly stayed in Ann Arbor before traveling to Jackson County, Waterloo Township, where they purchased this property in 1846 from James Goodwin, an immigrant from England. James Goodwin, his wife Sarah Goodwin and five children were already living in a log cabin on the property. Sarah and their youngest daughter, Emma, aged 4, died in 1842 (presumably from illness) and are buried on the farm.

Siebold began farming. The farm prospered, and in 1854, Siebold constructed a new house, which is now the northern section of the present farmhouse. Within a few years, the remainder of the farmhouse was built. At Siebold's death, the farm passed to his step-son, Johannes Jacob Ruehle. Ruehle married Catherine Archenbronn, then served in the Civil War, where his name was changed to "Realy." The Realys had seven children, five of whom remained unmarried and lived on the farm throughout their lives.

As the farm progressed into the twentieth century, it became known for its cider, processed in a cider mill that once stood across the street from the farmhouse. The Realy family lived on the farm until it was encompassed by the creation of the Waterloo State Recreation Area. When the last Realy brother died, the state of Michigan took possession of the property. The state demolished the barns and cider mill. In 1962, the Waterloo Area Historical Society was formed to save and restore the remainder of the farm. The Society arranged to lease three acres of land surrounding the farmyard from the state, on the condition they maintain the farm as a museum. The Society opened the farm as a museum, and it continues to be open to the public.

== Description ==
The Siebold farmhouse is a two-story brick structure built in two sections, distinguished by the gable roofs running at right angles to each other. Another L-shaped section on one side of the house is 1-1/2 stories high and is covered with clapboard siding. The house contains patches of fieldstone decorating the bricks. The house has a bay on the one side and three porches, all of which have Victorian style wood trim. One porch and the bay have wood shingle roofs.

On the interior, rooms include a pantry, dining room, sitting room, parlor, young girl's bedroom, weaving room, children's room, large front bedroom, parents' bedroom, and drying room. The clapboard section of the house was used as a work area, and contains a kitchen, hired man's quarters, and wood shed.

The farm also contains outbuildings, including a ten-foot Perkins windmill, a milk house, ice house, bake house, and a former hog barn (now a repair shop). The original barns and cider mill were demolished in the early 1960s.
