= Hadley Flour and Feed Mill =

- U.S. National Register of Historic Places
- Michigan State Historic Site
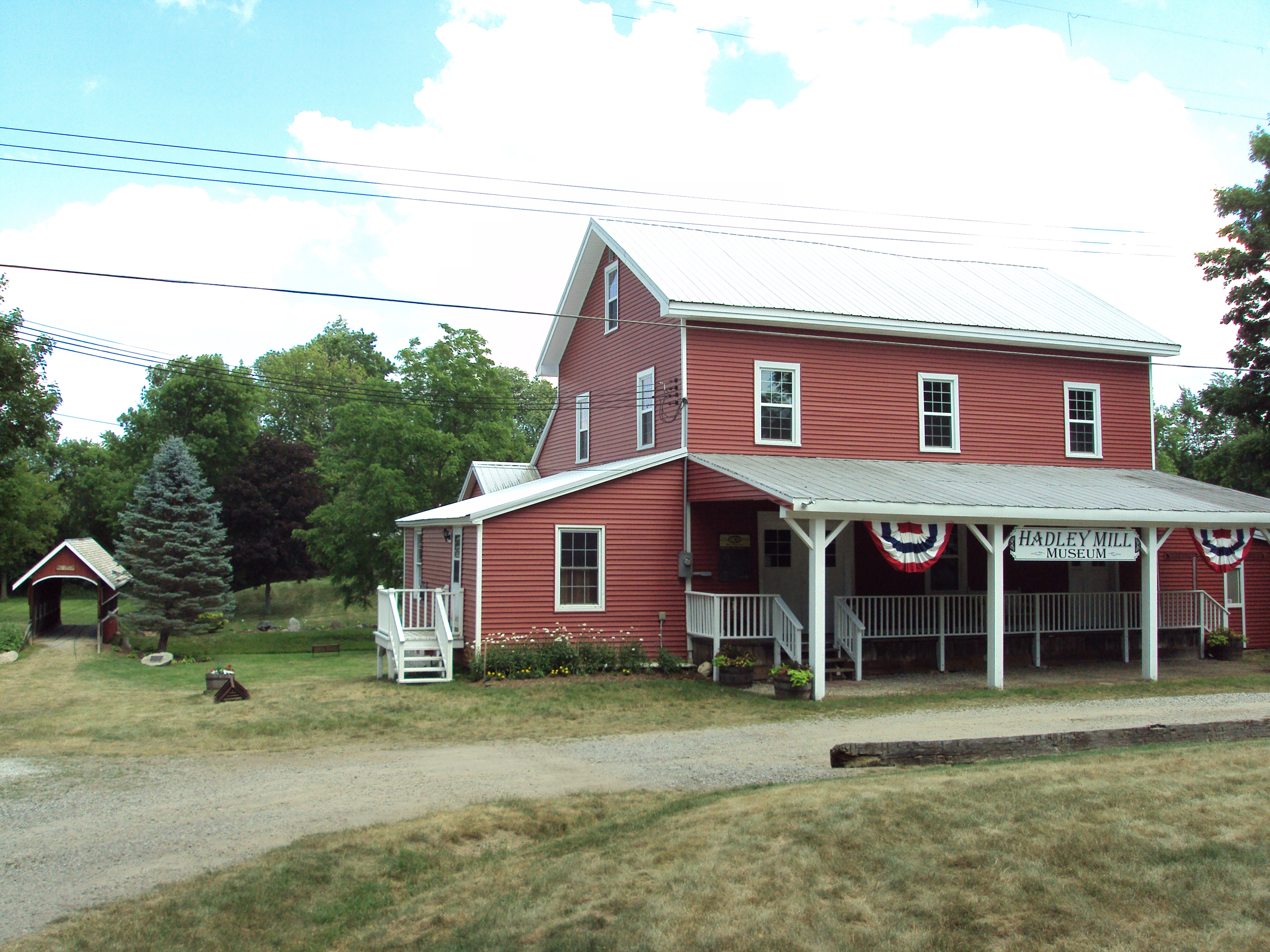

- Location within Michigan Location within the United States
- Interactive map
- Location: 3633 Hadley Road; Hadley Township, Michigan
- Coordinates: 42°57′03″N 83°24′10″W
- Built: 1874
- Architect: Peter Slimmer
- NRHP reference No.: 86002770

Significant dates
- Added to NRHP: September 25, 1986
- Designated MSHS: September 25, 1986

The Hadley Flour and Feed Mill is located at 3633 Hadley Road in rural Hadley Township in southwestern Lapeer County, Michigan. It was designated as a Michigan State Historic Site and also added to the National Register of Historic Places on September 25, 1986.

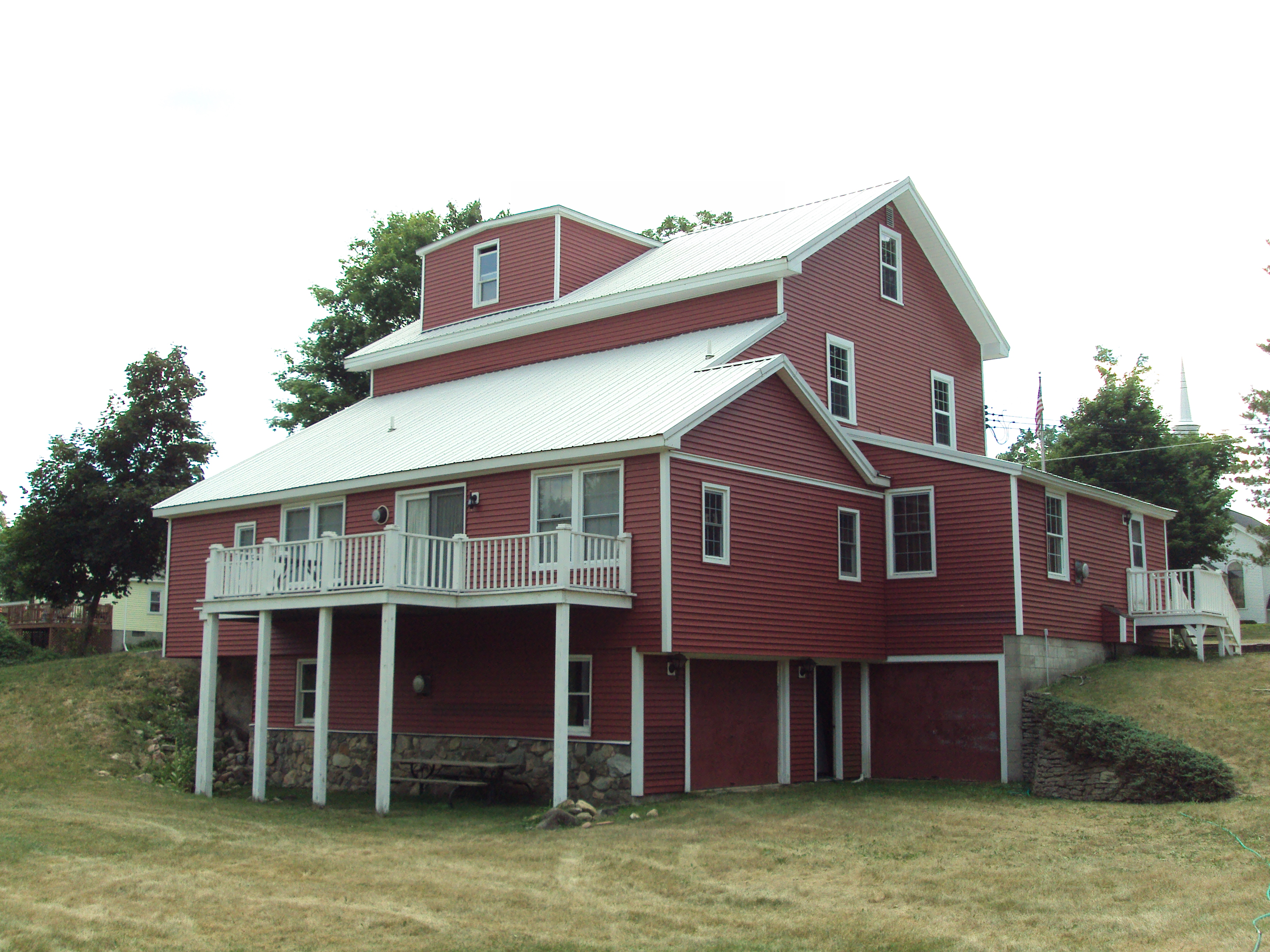
The back portion of the main structure

The site includes several structures, but the main building is a 2 1/2-story wooden gristmill with a full basement. The structure is painted white and red, which was characteristic of such structures at the time. It was a typical site constructed during the course of Lapeer County's booming agricultural growth, but today, it remains one of fewer than 60 remaining examples in the state. It was built in 1874 by Peter Slimmer along the small Mill Creek and has undergone numerous repairs over its history. It was the third such mill constructed on the site—the first being built in 1845 and the second in the early 1860s. The building once stood on stilts to allow water to pass beneath. These ponds were removed, along with the creek's dam when the structure was converted from a gristmill to produce electric power in 1924 to reflect growing changes in the twentieth century. After the site ceased operation in 1964, it was turned into an office and apartment building but was later converted into a park and museum known as the Hadley Mill Museum. The property was donated to the township in 2002. The covered bridge was added in recent years as part of the park's ambiance.
