= National Museum of Surveying =

Former museum in Springfield, Illinois, US

Coordinates: 39°48′7.3″N 89°38′54.1″W

The National Museum of Surveying was originally the Michigan Museum of Surveying, but in 2007, the museum moved to Springfield, Illinois, to become a national museum. The museum officially opened in Springfield on September 24, 2010 and closed in January, 2013. In the 10,000-square-foot (930 m^{2}) space, the museum housed many exhibits on surveying, a room sponsored by NCEES, and the Science on a Sphere. The museum was on the Old State Capitol Plaza, just north of the Old State Capitol.

== Exhibits ==
The museum had three exhibit rooms:

- The first exhibit room was funded by NCEES. The demographics of surveyors show an aging workforce, and the goal of this exhibit was to inspire students to become surveyors. The donation was $75,000 which was used to construct a 45-seat theater. The theater showed videos on the history and evolution of surveying.
- The second exhibit was on the history of surveying.
- The last exhibit was the Science on a Sphere, which was funded by NOAA

== See also ==
- Surveying in early America
