= Basement 414 =

Coordinates: 42.733°N 84.547°W

Basement 414 or 'B414' was a venue for various forms of artistic expression located in Lansing, Michigan. The venue hosted a variety of art exhibitions of any medium including paintings, musical acts, video and performance art, and other crafts including things such as napkin art. Artists such as Andrew W.K., Dead Prez and the Peppermint Creek Theatre Company, among others, have performed there.

Some well known 'Basement Bands' are Straight From the Fridge, Jason Spangler, Edible Intention, and Ouch! Me Arse. B414 is also where the band A Fatal Masquerade started playing before changing their name to This Day Means Nothing.

It closed in May 2012.
