= Macomb Area Conference =

Sports league

The Macomb Area Conference (abbreviated to MAC) (formerly known as the Macomb Athletic Conference) is a high school sports league located in Southeastern Michigan. It is a member of the Michigan High School Athletic Association (MHSAA). There are currently 36 members, spread across Macomb County, St. Clair County, Oakland County, and Wayne County.

The MAC offers sports for both boys and girls, including boys and girls cross country, boys football, boys and girls basketball, boys baseball, and girls softball, boys and girls soccer, boys and girls swimming, girls volleyball, boys and girls track and field, wrestling, boys hockey, and boys and girls tennis.

== League History ==
The MAC was formed in 1986 through the merger of the Macomb Conference and the Bi-County Conference, and began competition in September 1987.

=== Charter members ===
Charter Members
Previous league	School
Macomb Conference	Clinton Township Chippewa Valley, Fraser, Romeo, Sterling Heights, Sterling Heights Stevenson, Utica, Utica Eisenhower, Utica Ford, Warren Cousino, Warren Woods-Tower
Bi-County Conference	Clinton Township Clintondale, Grosse Pointe North, Harrison Township L'Anse Creuse, Roseville Brablec, St. Clair Shores Lake Shore, St. Clair Shores Lakeview, St. Clair Shores South Lake

=== Expansion ===
First Expansion
Brablec was closed and consolidated with Roseville High School in 1989. Roseville then joined the MAC the same year in place of Brablec.

Second Expansion
In 1990 the Eastern Michigan League was disbanded and all its former members joined the MAC.

- Eastpointe
- Grosse Pointe South
- Macomb L'Anse Creuse North
- Mt. Clemens
- New Baltimore Anchor Bay
- Port Huron
- Port Huron Northern

Third Expansion
In 1992, Warren High and C. S. Mott High consolidated and became Warren Mott High School, which joined the MAC in place of South Lake, which left to join the Macomb-Oakland Athletic Conference the same year.

Fourth Expansion
In 1996, both the St. Clair Area League and the Macomb-Oakland Athletic Conference were disbanded. All six of the former members of the SCAL and four of the eight schools from the MOAC (specifically, all the schools located in Macomb County) joined the MAC that same year.

St. Clair Area League:

- Algonac‡
- Imlay City†
- Marine City
- Marysville
- Richmond†
- St. Clair

Macomb-Oakland Area Conference:

- Center Line
- Warren Fitzgerald
- Warren Lincoln
- St. Clair Shores South Lake*

In addition, Dakota High School also joined the MAC in 1996 after being built in Macomb Township the previous year, making for a total of 11 schools joining the conference that year.

† -Both Imlay City and Richmond left in 1999 to join the Southern Thumb Athletic Association
‡ -Algonac left in 2002 to join the newly formed Blue Water Area Conference
* -South Lake rejoined the MAC after leaving four years prior

Fifth Expansion
In 2004, Madison Heights Madison and Madison Heights Lamphere, from the Oakland Activities Association, and New Haven, which previously ran an independent schedule, joined the MAC.

Sixth Expansion
In 2008, Clawson, from the Metro Conference, joined the MAC.

In 2016, Mt. Clemens left the MAC to seek an independent affiliation.

Seventh Expansion
In 2019, Hazel Park, from the Oakland Activities Association, joined the MAC.

=== Current members ===
Macomb Area Conference Memberships
School	City	Enrollment (as of 2019)	Class	Nickname	Colors
Macomb Dakota	Macomb Township	3,034	A	Cougars	Forest Green/Navy/Gray
Utica Eisenhower	Shelby Township	2,617	A	Eagles	Blue & Silver
Sterling Heights Stevenson	Sterling Heights	2,498	A	Titans	Navy Blue & White
Clinton Township Chippewa Valley	Clinton Township	2,386	A	Big Reds	Red & White
New Baltimore Anchor Bay	Fair Haven	1,993	A	Tars	Red & White
Romeo	Romeo	1,692	A	Bulldogs	Red & White
Macomb L'Anse Creuse North	Macomb Township	1,957	A	Crusaders	Black & Vegas Gold
Grosse Pointe South	Grosse Pointe Farms	1,510	A	Blue Devils	Blue & Gold
Warren Mott	Warren	1,513	A	Marauders	Maroon/White/Gold
Utica	Utica	1,899	A	Chieftains	Orange & Black
Grosse Pointe North	Grosse Pointe Woods	1,295	A	Norsemen	Green & Gold
Utica Ford	Sterling Heights	1,812	A	Falcons	Maroon & White
St. Clair Shores Lakeview	St. Clair Shores	1,404	A	Huskies	Blue & Silver
Port Huron	Port Huron	1,309	A	Big Reds	Red & White
Warren Cousino	Warren	1,448	A	Patriots	Red/White/Blue
Fraser	Fraser	1,538	A	Ramblers	Navy Blue & Gold
Roseville	Roseville	1,252	A	Panthers	Red & Black
Port Huron Northern	Port Huron	1,284	A	Huskies	Blue & Gold
Sterling Heights	Sterling Heights	1,464	A	Stallions	Black & Gold
Harrison Township L'Anse Creuse	Harrison Township	1,434	A	Lancers	Royal Blue & White
St. Clair Shores Lake Shore	St. Clair Shores	1,237	A	Shorians	Red & White
Warren Woods-Tower	Warren	1,148	A	Titans	Royal Blue & Silver
Eastpointe	Eastpointe	926	A	Shamrocks	Green & White
Warren Fitzgerald	Warren	1,020	A	Spartans	Blue & Maize
Marine City	Marine City	521	B	Mariners	Orange & Black
Hazel Park	Hazel Park	707	B	Vikings	Maroon & Grey
St. Clair	St. Clair	780	B	Saints	Red & Royal Blue
Madison Heights Madison	Madison Heights	307	C	Eagles	Purple & Gold
St. Clair Shores South Lake	St. Clair Shores	531	B	Cavaliers	Royal Blue & Gold
Marysville	Marysville	869	A	Vikings	Navy & White
Warren Lincoln	Warren	653	B	Abes	Red & Black
Clinton Township Clintondale	Clinton Township	392	C	Dragons	Blue & Gold
Clawson	Clawson	515	B	Trojans	Blue & Gold
Madison Heights Lamphere	Madison Heights	775	B	Rams	Blue & White
Center Line	Center Line	696	B	Panthers	Orange & Black
New Haven	New Haven	346	C	Rockets	Green & White

=== Former Members ===
Former MAC Members
School	City	Nickname	Colors	Departed	Successive Conference
Roseville Brablec	Roseville	Cougars	Purple & White	1989	None (consolidated with Roseville High)
Imlay City	Imlay City	Spartans	Blue & Yellow	1999	Southern Thumb Athletic Association
Richmond	Richmond	Blue Devils	Blue and White	1999	Southern Thumb Athletic Association
Algonac	Algonac	Muskrats	Blue & Gold	2002	Blue Water Area Conference
Mt. Clemens	Mt. Clemens	Battling Bathers	Red & Gray	2016	Independent

=== Membership Timeline with Football Divisions ===
MAC Red MAC White MAC Blue MAC Gold MAC Silver MAC Bronze MAC St. Clair MAC Macomb-Oakland

== Football ==
NOTE: Statistics are as of the end of the 2020 season.

=== Red Division ===
School	2020 Enrollment	Class	Red Titles	White Titles	Blue Titles	Gold Titles	Silver Titles	Bronze Titles	First Season in current division	Most recent Division Title
Macomb Dakota	3,007	A	10	1	-	-	-	-	2001	2022
Utica Eisenhower	2,599	A	15	-	-	-	-	-	1987	2023
Sterling Heights Stevenson	2,545	A	12	-	-	-	-	-	1987	2021
Clinton Township Chippewa Valley	2,347	A	6	-	-	-	-	-	1995	2023
Anchor Bay	1,950	A	-	3	2	1	-	-	2022	2021 (White Division)
Romeo	1,713	A	2	9	2	-	-	-	2016	2021

=== White Division ===
School	2020 Enrollment	Class	Red Titles	White Titles	Blue Titles	Gold Titles	Silver Titles	Bronze Titles	First Season in current division	Most recent Division Title
Harrison Township L'Anse Creuse	1,383	A	-	-	1	2	-	-	2022	2019 (Gold Division)
Grosse Pointe South	1,477	A	-	6	4	1	-	-	2022	2024
Roseville	1,497	A	-	-	2	-	-	-	2022	2017 (Blue Division)
Utica	1,916	A	-	2	-	-	-	-	2004	2010
St. Clair Shores Lakeview	1,390	A	-	-	-	-	1	-	2020	2010 (Silver Division)
Utica Ford	1,830	A	1	2	-	-	-	-	2014	2003

=== Blue Division ===
School	2020 Enrollment	Class	Red Titles	White Titles	Blue Titles	Gold Titles	Silver Titles	Bronze Titles	First Season in current division	Most recent Division Title
Macomb L’anse Creuse North	1,866	A	-	-	2	1	-	-	2022	2013
Port Huron	1,234	A	-	4	9	-	-	-	2012	2023
Warren Mott	1,497	A	-	4	3	-	-	-	2022	2020
Fraser	1,538	A	-	6	-	-	-	-	2018	1998 (White Division)
Sterling Heights	1,486	A	1	1	2	1	-	-	2020	2019 (Gold Division)
Port Huron Northern	1,198	A	-	1	3	-	-	-	2018	2022

=== Gold Division ===
School	2020 Enrollment	Class	Red Titles	White Titles	Blue Titles	Gold Titles	Silver Titles	Bronze Titles	First Season in current division	Most recent Division Title
St. Clair Shores Lakeshore	1,152	A	-	-	-	-	-	-	2022	-
Warren Cousino	1,306	A	-	-	4	9	-	-	2018	2023
St. Clair	782	B	-	-	-	2	-	-	2020	2021
Warren Woods Tower	1,137	A	-	-	-	2	2	-	2014	2018
Eastpointe	828	B	-	-	1	2	-	-	2018	2020
Grosse Pointe North	1,237	A	-	4	5	1	-	-	2020	2023

=== Silver Division ===
School	2020 Enrollment	Class	Red Titles	White Titles	Blue Titles	Gold Titles	Silver Titles	Bronze Titles	First Season in current division	Most recent Division Title
Marine City	538	B	-	-	-	17	5	-	2018	2022
Hazel Park	659	B	-	-	-	-	-	-	2019	-
Warren Fitzgerald	908	A	-	-	-	-	5	-	2020	2016
Madison Heights Madison	361	C	-	-	-	1	11	-	2004	2018
Clinton Township Clintondale	365	C	-	-	2	-	6	3	2020	2016 (Bronze Division)
Marysville	862	A	-	-	-	6	1	-	2018	2016 (Gold Division)

=== Bronze Division ===
School	2020 Enrollment	Class	Red Titles	White Titles	Blue Titles	Gold Titles	Silver Titles	Bronze Titles	First Season in current division	Most recent Division Title
Warren Lincoln	590	B	-	-	-	-	-	3	2008	2008
St. Clair Shores South Lake	485	B	-	-	-	-	1	2	2020	2016 (Silver Division)
Clawson	464	B	-	-	-	-	-	3	2018	2015
Madison Heights Lamphere	775	B	-	-	-	-	1	3	2014	2021
Center Line	639	B	-	-	-	-	-	2	2010	2022
New Haven	344	C	-	-	-	-	1	1	2008	2004 (Silver Division)

=== MAC Championships ===
Red Division Champions
Year	School	Conference	Overall
1987	Sterling Heights	6-0	10-1
1988	Utica Eisenhower	6-0	11-1
1989	Sterling Heights Stevenson; Utica Eisenhower	3-1; 3-1	7-2; 7-2
1990	Clinton Township Chippewa Valley; Utica Eisenhower	6-1; 6-1	8-2; 9-2
1991	Utica Eisenhower	7-0	9-1
1992	Utica Eisenhower	7-0	11-1
1993	Utica Eisenhower	4-0	10-1
1994	Utica Ford	5-0	9-1
1995	Sterling Heights Stevenson	4-0	11-1
1996	Sterling Heights Stevenson	4-0	12-1
1997	Sterling Heights Stevenson	5-0	11-1
1998	Sterling Heights Stevenson	5-0	11-1
1999	Sterling Heights Stevenson	5-0	9-2
2000	Utica Eisenhower	5-0	13-1
2001	Utica Eisenhower; Sterling Heights Stevenson; Clinton Township Chippewa Valley	4-1; 4-1; 4-1	12-2; 8-2; 12-2
2002	Utica Eisenhower; Macomb Dakota; Clinton Township Chippewa Valley	4-1; 4-1; 4-1	8-3; 11-2; 7-3
2003	Utica Eisenhower	5-0	13-1
2004	Utica Eisenhower	5-0	10-1
2005	Sterling Heights Stevenson	5-0	10-1
2006	Macomb Dakota	4-1	13-1
2007	Macomb Dakota	5-0	14-0
2008	Sterling Heights Stevenson; Macomb Dakota	4-1; 4-1	10-2; 9-2
2009	Sterling Heights Stevenson	5-0	13-1
2010	Romeo	5-0	9-2
2011	Utica Eisenhower	5-0	11-2
2012	Macomb Dakota	5-0	10-2
2013	Macomb Dakota	5-0	11-1
2014	Macomb Dakota	4-1	8-3
2015	Macomb Dakota	4-1	9-3
2016	Utica Eisenhower	5-0	12-1
2017	Utica Eisenhower	5-0	11-1
2018	Clinton Township Chippewa Valley	5-0	14-0**
2019	Clinton Township Chippewa Valley	5-0	9-1
2020	Sterling Heights Stevenson Macomb Dakota	4-1 4-1	7-2 6-2
2021	Sterling Heights Stevenson Romeo	4-1 4-1	10-3 9-2

White Division Champions
Year	School	Conference	Overall
1987	Romeo; Grosse Pointe North; Warren Cousino	3-1; 3-1; 3-1	6-3; 6-3; 5-4
1988	Romeo	4-0	7-2
1989	Romeo; Grosse Pointe North	4-1; 4-1	7-2; 5-4
1990	Romeo	6-1	6-3
1991	Fraser	6-1	8-3
1992	Fraser	7-0	10-1
1993	Fraser	6-0	10-2
1994	Fraser	5-0	7-3
1995	Port Huron	4-0	5-4
1996	Port Huron	4-0	7-2
1997	Fraser	5-1	6-3
1998	Fraser	6-0	9-1
1999	Macomb Dakota	6-0	10-2
2000	Utica	6-0	8-2
2001	Sterling Heights	6-0	8-3
2002	New Baltimore Anchor Bay; Port Huron Northern; Romeo; Utica Ford	4-2; 4-2; 4-2; 4-2	5-4; 5-4; 7-4; 6-4
2003	Utica Ford	6-0	6-4
2004	Grosse Pointe North	6-0	9-2
2005	Romeo	6-0	8-2
2006	Warren Cousino; Grosse Pointe North; Romeo	5-1; 5-1; 5-1	11-1; 8-3; 7-3
2007	Warren Cousino	6-0	11-1
2008	Warren Mott	5-0	6-4
2009	Warren Mott	5-0	8-2
2010	Utica	5-0	7-3
2011	Warren Cousino	5-0	6-4
2012	Port Huron	5-0	7-3
2013	Warren Mott	5-0	10-1
2014	Port Huron; Romeo	4-1; 4-1	7-3; 6-4
2015	Romeo	5-0	13-1
2016	Grosse Pointe South	5-0	8-4
2017	Grosse Pointe South	5-0	5-5
2018	Grosse Pointe South	5-0	8-2
2019	Grosse Pointe South	5-0	7-3
2020	Anchor Bay Warren Mott	3-1 3-1	4-3 8-2
2021	Anchor Bay	5-0	7-3

Blue Division Champions
Year	School	Conference	Overall
1987	Harrison Township L'Anse Creuse	4-0	7-2
1988	Harrison Township L'Anse Creuse	4-0	8-1
1989	Warren Cousino	5-0	7-2
1990	Clinton Township Clintondale	7-0	8-2
1991	Clinton Township Clintondale	7-0	8-1
1992	Grosse Pointe North; Mt. Clemens	6-1; 6-1	7-2; 8-3
1993	Warren Cousino	4-0	7-2
1994	Warren Cousino; Grosse Pointe North; Roseville	4-1; 4-1; 4-1	6-3; 5-4; 6-3
1995	Grosse Pointe North	4-0	7-3
1996	Warren Mott	4-0	7-2
1997	Romeo	6-0	7-2
1998	Sterling Heights	6-0	7-3
1999	Eastpointe	5-1	5-4
2000	Harrison Township L'Anse Creuse; New Baltimore Anchor Bay	5-1; 5-1	8-3; 7-2
2001	Harrison Township L'Anse Creuse; Romeo; Warren Cousino	5-1; 5-1; 5-1	7-3; 9-2; 9-2
2002	Warren Mott	5-1	6-4
2003	Grosse Pointe South; Port Huron	5-1; 5-1	7-4; 6-4
2004	Warren Cousino; Port Huron	5-1; 5-1	6-4; 7-3
2005	Warren Cousino	6-0	7-3
2006	Warren Mott	6-0	7-3
2007	Macomb L'Anse Creuse North; Port Huron	5-1; 5-1	6-3; 7-3
2008	Sterling Heights	5-0	5-4
2009	Grosse Pointe South	5-0	7-3
2010	New Baltimore Anchor Bay	5-0	7-3
2011	Port Huron	5-0	10-2
2012	Grosse Pointe South	5-0	8-2
2013	Grosse Pointe South; Macomb L'Anse Creuse North	4-1; 4-1	6-4; 8-2
2014	Warren Cousino	5-0	5-5
2015	Grosse Pointe North; Warren Cousino	4-1; 4-1	5-4; 5-4
2016	Warren Cousino	5-0	8-2
2017	Grosse Pointe North; Roseville; Port Huron	4-1; 4-1; 4-1	6-3; 6-4; 4-5
2018	Port Huron Northern	5-0	10-2
2019	Port Huron Northern	5-0	8-2
2020	Port Huron	5-0	8-1
2021	Port Huron	5-0	6-4

Gold Division Champions
Year	School	Conference	Overall
1993	Mt. Clemens	6-0	7-3
1994	Mt. Clemens	5-0	7-2
1995	Harrison Township L'Anse Creuse; Macomb L'Anse Creuse North	2-1; 2-1	6-3; 5-4
1996	New Baltimore Anchor Bay	4-0	6-3
1997	Marysville; Warren Woods Tower	5-1; 5-1	7-3; 7-3
1998	Marine City	6-0	8-2
1999	Marine City	5-0	10-1
2000	Marysville	5-0	10-1
2001	Marine City	5-0	11-1
2002	Marine City	5-0	11-1
2003	Marysville	5-0	9-1
2004	Marine City	7-0	11-1
2005	Marine City; Marysville	6-1; 6-1	10-2; 8-2
2006	Marine City	6-0	11-1
2007	Marine City	6-0	13-1**
2008	Marine City	5-0	10-1
2009	Marine City	5-0	12-1
2010	Madison Heights Madison; Marine City	4-1; 4-1	9-3; 10-2
2011	Marine City	5-0	13-1
2012	Marine City	5-0	8-2
2013	St. Clair	5-0	11-2
2014	Marine City	5-0	10-1
2015	Marine City; Marysville; Sterling Heights	4-1; 4-1; 4-1	6-4; 7-3; 7-3
2016	Marysville	5-0	10-1
2017	Marine City	5-0	8-3
2018	Warren Woods-Tower	5-0	9-2
2019	Eastpointe L’anse Creuse Sterling Heights	4-1 4-1 4-1	6-4 6-4 6-4
2020	Eastpointe	5-0	8-1
2021	St. Clair	5-0	8-3

Silver Division Champions
Year	School	Conference	Overall
1995	Clinton Township Clintondale	4-0	6-3
1996	Warren Woods-Tower	4-0	7-2
1997	Mt. Clemens; Warren Fitzgerald	6-1; 6-1	6-3; 6-3
1998	Warren Fitzgerald	7-0	8-1
1999	Clinton Township Clintondale	6-0	8-2
2000	Clinton Township Clintondale	6-0	11-1
2001	Warren Woods-Tower	6-0	10-1
2002	Clinton Township Clintondale	5-0	8-3
2003	Clinton Township Clintondale	5-0	10-2
2004	New Haven	6-0	8-2
2005	Madison Heights Madison	6-0	8-2
2006	Madison Heights Madison	7-0	13-1
2007	Madison Heights Madison	7-0	12-1**
2008	Warren Fitzgerald	5-0	11-1
2009	Madison Heights Madison	5-0	11-1
2010	Clinton Township Clintondale; St. Clair Shores Lakeview; Madison Heights Lamphere; Warren Fitzgerald	3-2; 3-2; 3-2; 3-2	6-4; 7-4; 6-4; 7-4
2011	Marysville	5-0	8-2
2012	Madison Heights Madison	4-1	8-2
2013	Madison Heights Madison	5-0	11-1
2014	Madison Heights Madison	5-0	9-3
2015	Madison Heights Madison	5-0	9-2
2016	Madison Heights Madison; St. Clair Shores South Lake; Warren Fitzgerald	4-1; 4-1; 4-1	6-4; 7-3; 8-2
2017	Madison Heights Madison	5-0	12-1
2018	Madison Heights Madison	5-0	13-1
2019	Marine City	5-0	10-1
2020	Marine City	5-0	8-2
2021	Marine City	5-0	13-1

Bronze Division Champions
Year	School	Conference	Overall
2008	Warren Lincoln	5-0	8-2
2009	Clawson	5-0	5-4
2010	St. Clair Shores South Lake	5-0	8-2
2011	St. Clair Shores South Lake	5-0	8-2
2012	Clinton Township Clintondale	5-0	9-1
2013	Clinton Township Clintondale	5-0	9-1
2014	Clawson	5-0	6-4
2015	Clawson; Warren Lincoln	4-1; 4-1	6-4; 5-4
2016	Clintondale; New Haven; Warren Lincoln	3-1; 3-1; 3-1	4-5; 4-5; 4-5
2017	Madison Heights Lamphere	4-0	5-5
2018	Center Line	4-0	6-4
2019	Clawson	5-0	7-4
2020	Madison Heights Lamphere	5-0	8-1
2021	Madison Heights Lamphere	5-0	7-3

St. Clair Division Champions
Year	School	Conference	Overall
1996	Marine City; Marysville; Richmond	4-1; 4-1; 4-1	9-2; 7-3; 7-2

Macomb-Oakland Division Champions
Year	School	Conference	Overall
1996	Center Line; St. Clair Shores South Lake; Warren Lincoln	2-1; 2-1; 2-1	4-4; 6-2; 6-3

**- denotes that the team won a state championship title that year

== Sources ==
- MAC official website
- MHSAA official website
- Michigan High School Football
