= Oakland Schools =

School district in Michigan, United States

Oakland Schools (OS) is the intermediate school district serving Oakland County, Michigan. The intermediate district serves 28 local school districts in the suburbs of Detroit, and is headquartered in Waterford Township.

== History ==
In 1962 Oakland Schools was established.

In October 2003 the lawyer for the intermediate school district began handling Freedom of Information Act instead of the communications department of the district. This occurred after the district received criticism accusing it of withholding documents from the public. Later that month the Oakland Schools board of education removed James Redmond from his position of superintendent because he had used district funds to pay for personal flying lessons and for arranging $680,000 in buyouts. The board installed Dan Austin as acting superintendent.

Due to decreased property values, in 2009 the district announced that furloughs, layoffs, and wage freezes would occur.

== Districts ==
- Avondale School District
- Berkley School District
- Birmingham Public Schools
- Bloomfield Hills School District
- Brandon School District
- Clarenceville School District
- Clarkston Community Schools
- Clawson Public Schools
- Farmington Public Schools
- Ferndale Public Schools
- Hazel Park Schools
- Holly Area Schools
- Huron Valley School District
- Lake Orion Community Schools
- Lamphere Public Schools
- Madison District Public Schools
- Novi Community School District
- Oak Park School District
- Oxford Community Schools
- School District of the City of Pontiac
- Rochester Community Schools
- Royal Oak Schools
- South Lyon Community Schools
- Southfield Public Schools
- Troy School District
- Walled Lake Consolidated Schools
- Waterford School District
- West Bloomfield School District
