= Memorial Recreation Park =

Athletic and recreation complex in Port Huron, Michigan

Coordinates: 42.9736634°N 82.4485946°W

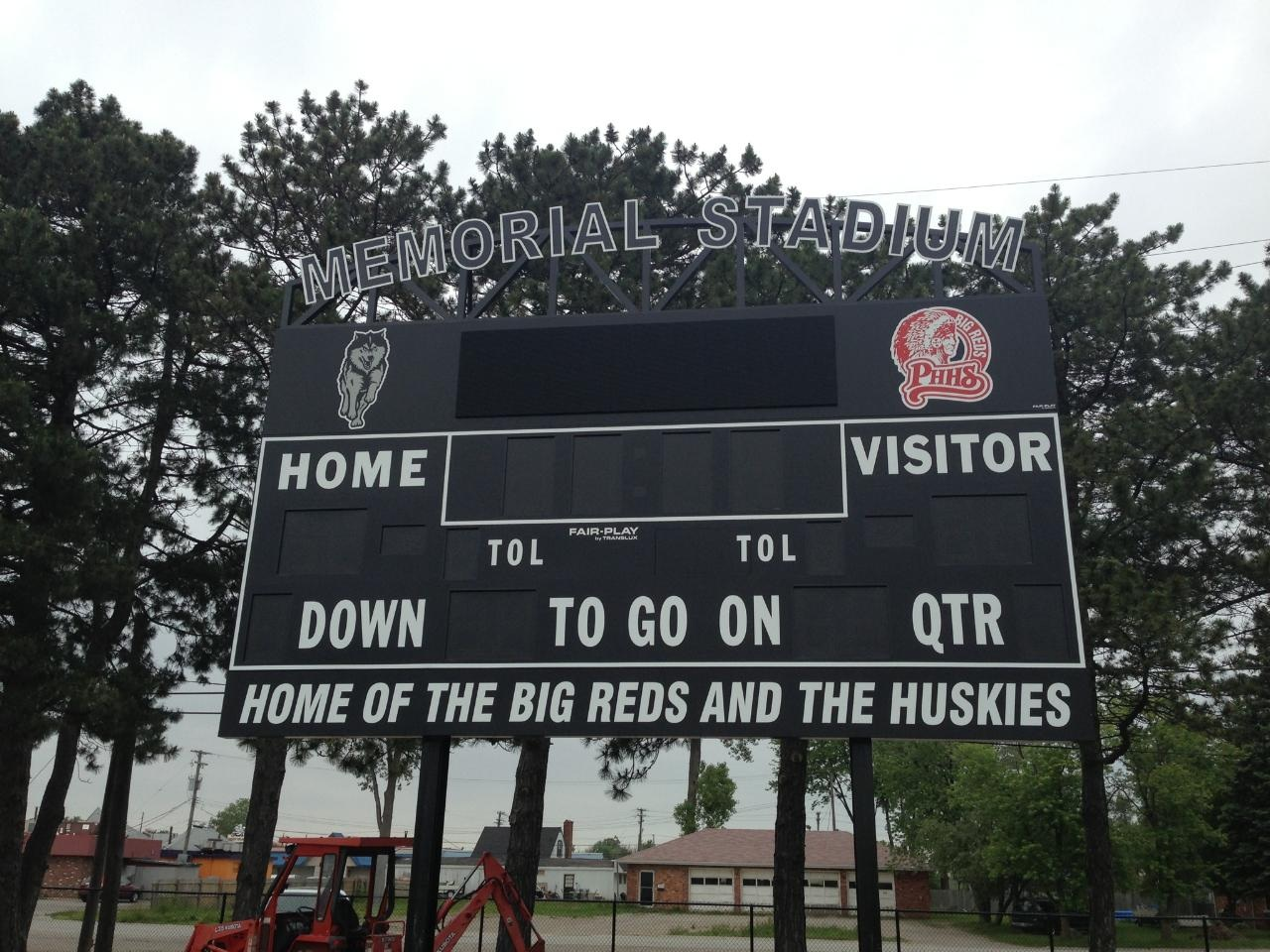
New scoreboard

Memorial Recreation Park is an athletic and recreation complex in Port Huron, Michigan. The main facility of the complex is a 5,500-seat stadium, home to the Port Huron Northern High School and Port Huron High School football teams. In addition, there are in the 27-acre (11 ha) complex tennis courts, four baseball fields, four softball fields, several football fields, and a quarter-mile track.

The complex was built in 1945 and is dedicated to the men and women of Port Huron who served in World War II.
