= Lakeview High School (St. Clair Shores, Michigan) =

Lakeview High School (LHS)
- Husky Emblem

Location
- 21100 East 11 Mile Rd; St. Clair Shores, Macomb, Michigan 48081; United States; 42°29′43″N 82°54′13″W

Information
- Type: Public High School
- Established: Established = c. 1927-1931 (present building opened 1955)
- School district: Lakeview Public Schools
- NCES District ID: 2620700
- Superintendent: Karl D. Paulson
- NCES School ID: 262088005759
- Principal: Scott Kapla
- Teaching staff: 61.61 (FTE) (2023–2024)
- Grades: 9-12
- Enrollment: 1,441 (2023–2024)
- Student to teacher ratio: 23.39 (2023–2024)
- Schedule: 7:45-2:40
- Hours in school day: 6h:05m
- Campus: Suburb, large
- Colors: Silver & Blue
- Fight song: "The Silver & The Blue"
- Athletics: Lakeview competes in the Macomb Area Conference (MAC) across multiple sports: Fall: Cross country, football, golf, soccer, swimming & diving (girls), tennis (boys), volleyball; Winter: Basketball, bowling, cheerleading, ice hockey, swimming & diving (boys), wrestling; Spring: Baseball, golf (boys), lacrosse, soccer (girls), softball, tennis (girls), track & field
- Athletics conference: Macomb Area Conference
- Mascot: Harper The Husky
- Nickname: Huskies
- Team name: Lakeview Huskies
- Rival: Lake Shore Shorians, South Lake Cavaliers
- Website: lakeviewhs.lakeviewpublicschools.org

Lakeview High School is a public secondary school located in St. Clair Shores, Michigan, serving students in grades 9 through 12 within Lakeview Public Schools .

== History and district background ==
Lakeview High School was established during the mid-20th century to accommodate post-war suburban growth along Lake St. Clair in Macomb County. As residential expansion increased local enrollment, Lakeview Public Schools centralized its secondary education programs on East Eleven Mile Road.

The city of St. Clair Shores is unique in that it is served by three separate public school systems: Lakeview Public Schools in the central area, Lake Shore Public Schools to the north, and South Lake Schools to the south. Each district operates independently with its own high school facility, administration, and elected board of education.

== Campus and facilities ==
The main campus layout comprises multi-wing academic structures, specialized science laboratories, administrative offices, and dedicated guidance suites.

=== Educational and cultural facilities ===
- Schaublin Auditorium (pronounced SHOH-blin; /ˈʃoʊblɪn/): A premier 1,528-seat performing arts center and local landmark, widely recognized as one of the largest and most technically equipped high school venues in Macomb County. The facility features professional-grade production infrastructure, including an ETC Ion lighting control console, Shure QLXD digital wireless microphone systems, high-powered followspots, and specialized theatrical performance flooring. As a major regional cultural hub, the auditorium regularly hosts prominent organizations, including the Detroit Symphony Orchestra (DSO) and the Michigan School Band and Orchestra Association (MSBOA) District 16 Festivals.
- Media Center: A centralized digital library providing research databases, computer labs, and collaborative study spaces.
- Cafeteria and Commons: A modern student dining hall and central commons area redesign.

=== Athletic grounds ===
- Stadium Complex:

Richard D. Black Field serves as the primary outdoor stadium for the Huskies' football, soccer, track and field, and lacrosse programs. The field features an artificial turf surface with alternating grey and green play areas, bordered by royal blue end zones with bold white block lettering displaying "LAKEVIEW" and "HUSKIES". At the center field line, the playing surface features a large Husky head logo rendered in white, black, and royal blue. Enclosing the field is a multi-lane, all-weather black running track, accompanied by elevated aluminum bleachers, field lighting, and a multi-story press box.

- Gymnasiums:

Indoor facilities supporting varsity basketball, volleyball, cheerleading, wrestling, and physical education courses.

- Diamond Sports Complex: Dedicated varsity and sub-varsity baseball and softball fields adjacent to main campus grounds.

== Academics ==
The daily instructional schedule operates on a standard bell timetable from 7:45 a.m. to 2:40 p.m. The curriculum aligns with Michigan Merit Curriculum standards while offering college preparation, vocational training, and fine arts options.

=== Departmental structure ===
- Mathematics and Sciences: Coursework ranging from Algebra and Biology to Advanced Placement (AP) Chemistry, Physics, and Calculus.
- Humanities: Literature composition, World History, United States History, Civics, and Economics.
- World Languages: Multi-year language programs in Spanish and French.
- Career Technical Education (CTE): Applied technology, business management, digital media, and industrial arts.
- Dual Enrollment: Opportunities for qualifying upperclassmen to earn concurrent college credit through regional institutions such as Macomb Community College.

== Student life and culture ==
=== Music and performing arts ===
The school maintains an active performing arts division consisting of marching band, concert band, jazz ensemble, and choir. The Lakeview High School Marching Band regularly performs at varsity football games, regional competitions, and community parades throughout St. Clair Shores.

=== School fight song ===
The official fight song of Lakeview High School is titled "The Silver & The Blue". Unlike many secondary institutions that adapt musical arrangements from major universities, "The Silver & The Blue" is an original in-house composition featuring custom lyrics written specifically for Lakeview High School.

"The Silver & the Blue"

Cheers for the Silver and the Blue, Shining for Lakeview, Colors of Victory, Loyalty, and Everything that sets us singing. A song for the glory of the game. Fight! Team, we're for you, Loyal to Lakeview High and the Silver and the Blue!

RAH! RAH! RAH!

Rah! Rah! for Lakeview, Lakeview must win. Fight to the finish, Never give in...

Rah! Rah! for Lakeview, You do your best, boys! (Team!) We'll do the rest, boys! (Team!) Rah! Rah! for Lakeview High!

=== Extracurricular organizations ===
Students participate in various academic honor societies, service groups, and interest clubs:

- National Honor Society (NHS)
- Student Council and Class Leadership
- VEX Robotics Team
- Yearbook and Student Journalism Staff
- Art Club and Community Service Coalitions
- Auto Club

== Athletics ==
The Lakeview Huskies field teams across multiple sports as a member institution of the Macomb Area Conference (MAC). Official school athletic colors are blue and silver.

=== Interscholastic sports offered ===
Season	Boys' Athletics	Girls' Athletics
Fall	Cross Country, Football, Golf, Soccer, Tennis	Cross Country, Golf, Soccer, Swimming & Diving, Volleyball
Winter	Basketball, Bowling, Ice Hockey, Swimming & Diving, Wrestling	Basketball, Bowling, Cheerleading, Gymnastics
Spring	Baseball, Golf, Lacrosse, Track & Field	Golf, Lacrosse, Softball, Soccer, Tennis, Track & Field

=== City rivalries ===
Lakeview maintains long-standing city athletic rivalries with St. Clair Shores' two other public high schools: the Lake Shore High School Shorians and the South Lake High School Cavaliers.
