= Lake Shore High School =

Location
- 22980 East Thirteen Mile Road; Saint Clair Shores, Michigan 48082; United States; 42°31′20″N 82°52′52″W

Information
- Type: Public high school
- Founded: 1923
- School district: Lake Shore Public Schools
- Superintendent: Joe DiPonio
- Principal: Janelle Bross
- Teaching staff: 51.31 (FTE)
- Grades: 9–12
- Enrollment: 914 (2024–2025)
- Student to teacher ratio: 17.81
- Campus type: Suburb
- Colors: Red; Black
- Athletics conference: Macomb Area Conference
- Mascot: Shorie
- Nickname: Shorians
- Rival: Lakeview High School
- Newspaper: The Shoreline
- Feeder schools: John F. Kennedy Middle School
- Website: lshs.lakeshoreschools.org

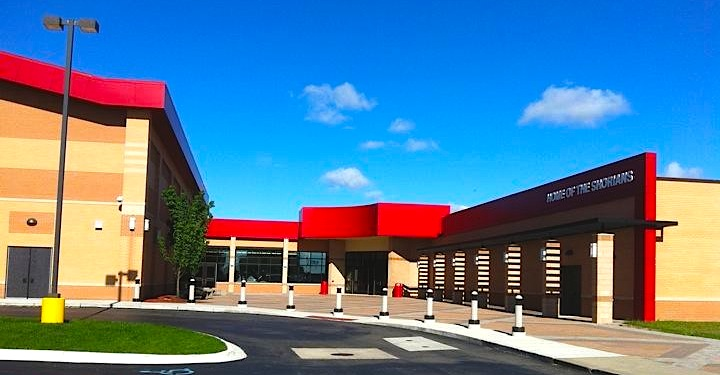
Lake Shore High School in 2013

Lake Shore High School is a high school located in the lakefront community of St. Clair Shores, Michigan, United States. The school, a part of Lake Shore Public Schools, serves grades 9–12. The nickname for Lake Shore is the Shorians. Lake Shore High School offers training in CAD, dental (no longer offered), web design and video production along with college advanced placement classes and dual enrollment. Janelle Bross is the current principal.

== Extracurriculars ==
=== Sports ===
Lake Shore is best known, athletically, for the 1993 and 1994 boys' basketball team that went 26–1 and 28–0, respectively, and winning the Class B State Championship in 1994. As of December 2013 they were the only boys' basketball team in Macomb County to ever win the state championship. The 1974 Lake Shore hockey team also won their only state championship, with the final game being played at Yost Arena in Ann Arbor, Michigan.

=== Music ===
The school hosts three band classes: Jazz Band, Symphonic Band and Wind Ensemble. For concerts, graduation ceremony, and competition at MSBOA, Symphonic Band and Wind Ensemble are combined into Wind Symphony.

The choral program includes the Concert Choir, and Fusion Show Choir. The choirs combine each spring to produce a musical; they performed their first musical in 1973.

== Notable alumni ==
- George Allen (1937) – American football coach in the National Football League and United States Football League; member of the Pro Football Hall of Fame
- Anne Fletcher (1984) – dancer, choreographer and film director
- Faye Grant (1975) – actress
- Donald Patrick Harvey (1978) – actor (Die Hard 2, Walker, Texas Ranger)
- Candice S. Miller (1972) – Michigan Secretary of State, United States House of Representatives
- Alto Reed (1966) – saxophonist, member of Bob Seger and the Silver Bullet Band
- Mark Wells (1975) – member of the 1980 Miracle on Ice U.S. Men's Olympic ice hockey team
- Rachelle Wilkos (1989) – television producer
- Thomas J. Wilson (1975) – chairman and chief executive officer, the Allstate Corporation
- John Ziegler, Jr. (1952) – president of the National Hockey League (1977–1992) and member of the Hockey Hall of Fame (1987)
