= WORW =

High school radio station at Port Huron Northern High School in Port Huron, Michigan

Coordinates: 43.025°N 82.436°W

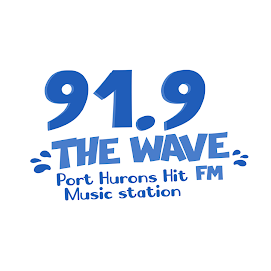
- Port Huron, Michigan; United States
- Frequency: 91.9 MHz
- Branding: 919 The Wave FM

Programming
- Format: Contemporary Hit Radio–Top 40

Ownership
- Owner: Port Huron Area School District

History
- First air date: September 30, 1981; 45 years ago

Technical information
- Licensing authority: FCC
- Facility ID: 53032
- Class: A
- ERP: 170 watts horizontal polarization only
- HAAT: 6 meters (20 ft)

Links
- Public license information: Public file; LMS
- Website: Official Radio Site, Official TV Site

WORW (91.9 FM, "The Wave") is a high school radio station located in Port Huron Northern High School broadcasting a CHR/Top 40 format. Licensed to Port Huron, Michigan, it first began broadcasting on September 30, 1981.

In fall of 2005, Faculty Advisor Carrie Maggs updated the high school radio station's studio with an automation system allowing the station to begin broadcasting 24 hours a day, 7 days a week. Today the current Faculty Advisor is Ronald Neal and is also a speech teacher and broadcasting teacher.

The current transmission range for the station is approximately 13 miles from the tower at 150watts (located at Port Huron Northern High School).

WORW TV is 91.9FM's student-run and produced TV station also located in Port Huron, Michigan. They started producing news, sports, and community news packages in 2016.
