= South Lake High School (Michigan) =

Location
- 21900 East 9 Mile Rd; St. Clair Shores, Michigan 48080; United States; 42°27′57″N 82°54′07″W

Information
- Type: Public high school
- School district: South Lake Schools
- Principal: Dr. Andrew Rousselo
- Teaching staff: 28.26 (on an FTE basis)
- Grades: 9-12
- Enrollment: 474 (2023-2024)
- Student to teacher ratio: 16.77
- Campus: Suburb, large
- Colors: Royal blue & gold
- Athletics conference: Macomb Area Conference
- Nickname: Cavaliers
- Website: slhs.solake.org

South Lake High School is a high school in St. Clair Shores, Michigan in the Metro Detroit area, and serves grades 9-12. It is the only high school in the South Lake Schools district.

The school district, of which this is the sole comprehensive high school, includes southern St. Clair Shores and portions of Eastpointe and Grosse Pointe Shores.

== Demographics ==
The demographic breakdown of the 615 students enrolled in 2015-2016 was:

- Male - 51.5%
- Female - 48.5%
- Native American/Alaskan - 0%
- Asian/Pacific islanders - 1%
- Black - 55%
- Hispanic - 1.8%
- White - 37.4%
- Multiracial - 4.9%

64.1% of the students were eligible for free or reduced-cost lunch.
