= Lakeview Public Schools (Michigan) =

School district in Michigan

Address
- 27575 Harper Avenue Saint Clair Shores, Macomb, Michigan, 48081; United States

District information
- Type: Public
- Grades: PreK–12
- Superintendent: Karl Paulsen
- Budget: $77,155,000 expenditures (2022-2023)
- NCES District ID: 2620880

Students and staff
- Students: 4,156 (2024–2025)
- Teachers: 229.37 (on an FTE basis) (2024-2025)
- Staff: 414.32 (on an FTE basis) (2024-2025)
- Student–teacher ratio: 18.12 (2024-2025)

Other information
- Website: www.lakeviewpublicschools.org

Lakeview Public Schools is a public school district in the Metro Detroit area. It serves the central part of St. Clair Shores, Michigan.

== History ==
The first class graduated from Lakeview High School in 1931. The present high school opened during the 1955-1956 school year.

== Schools ==
Schools in the Lakeview Public Schools district
School	Address	Notes
Lakeview High School	21100 East Eleven Mile, Saint Clair Shores	Grades 9-12
Jefferson Middle School	27900 Rockwood, Saint Clair Shores	Grades 6-8
Ardmore Elementary School	27001 Greater Mack, Saint Clair Shores	Grades K-5
Greenwood Elementary School	27900 Joan, Saint Clair Shores	Grades K-5
Harmon Elementary School	24800 Harmon, Saint Clair Shores	Grades K-5
Princeton Elementary School	20300 Statler, Saint Clair Shores	Grades K-5
Wheat Early Childhood Center	27575 Harper Avenue, Saint Clair Shores	Preschool
