= Braiden McGregor =

American football player (born 2001)

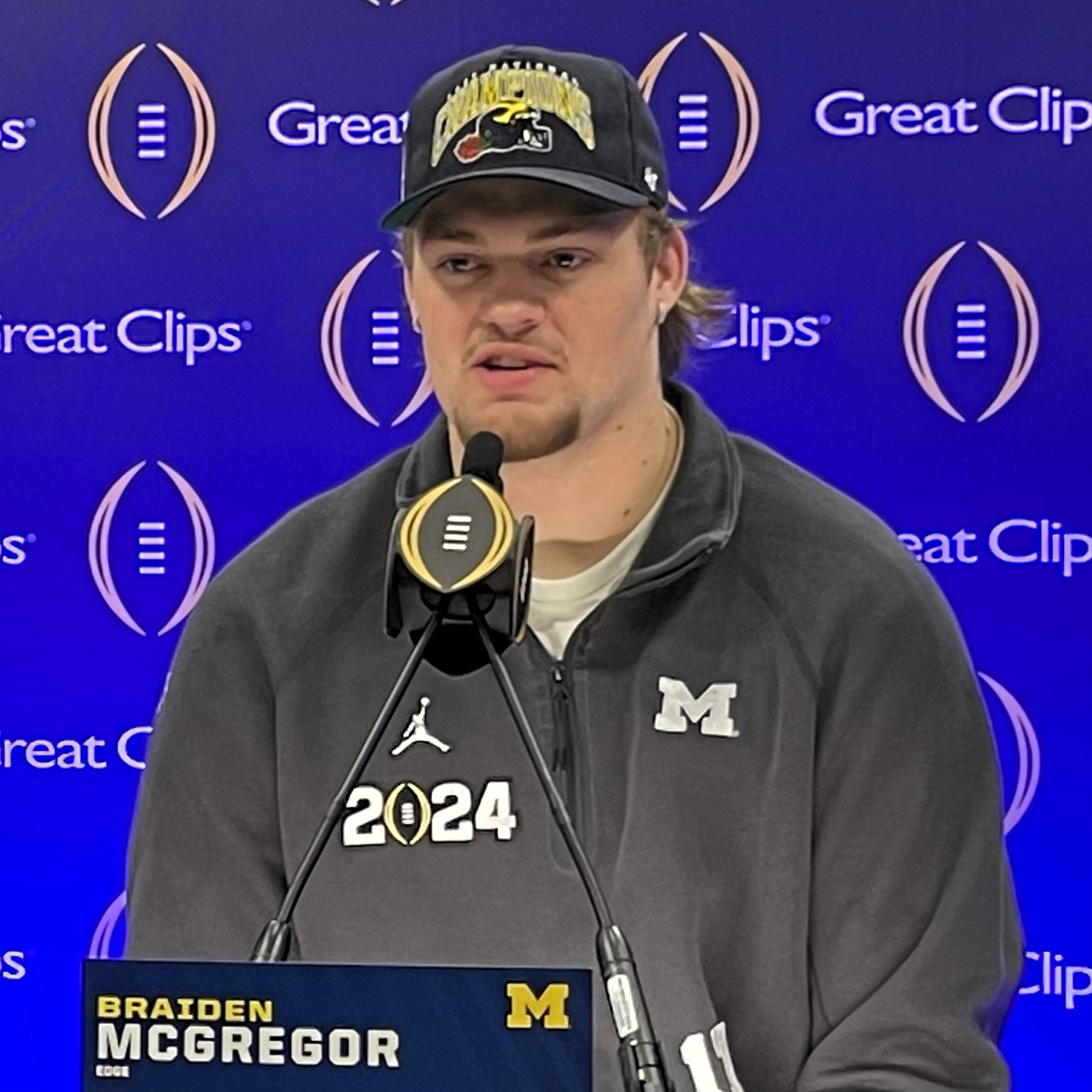
- McGregor with Michigan in 2024.

No. 55 – New York Jets
- Position: Defensive end
- Roster status: Injured reserve

Personal information
- Born: July 12, 2001 (age 25); Port Huron, Michigan, U.S.
- Listed height: 6 ft 6 in (1.98 m)
- Listed weight: 267 lb (121 kg)

Career information
- High school: Port Huron Northern (Port Huron, Michigan)
- College: Michigan (2020–2023)
- NFL draft: 2024: undrafted

Career history
- New York Jets (2024–present)

Awards and highlights
- CFP national champion (2023)

Career NFL statistics as of 2025
- Total tackles: 21
- Sacks: 1
- Pass deflections: 1
- Stats at Pro Football Reference

Braiden McGregor (born July 12, 2001) is an American professional football defensive end for the New York Jets of the National Football League (NFL). He played college football for the Michigan Wolverines, winning three consecutive Big Ten Conference titles and a national championship in 2023.

== Early life ==
McGregor was born on July 12, 2001, in Port Huron, Michigan. He attended Port Huron Northern High School, and was a three-time All-State and All-Conference selection as a football player.

As a junior, McGregror recorded 99 tackles, 13 tackles for loss, eight sacks, two forced fumbles and two interceptions. As a senior, he played in the first seven games of the season before injuring his knee and missing the remainder of the season. He registered 32 tackles, 10 tackles for loss and two sacks. He set a school record with 227 career tackles.

McGregor was ranked as the #1 high school football player in the state of Michigan in 2020, and rated as the #32 overall ranked player in the country in ESPN’s Top 300. He received scholarship offers from 36 schools, including Alabama, Clemson, Ohio State, and Notre Dame. On May 24, 2019, McGregor committed to the University of Michigan.

== College career ==
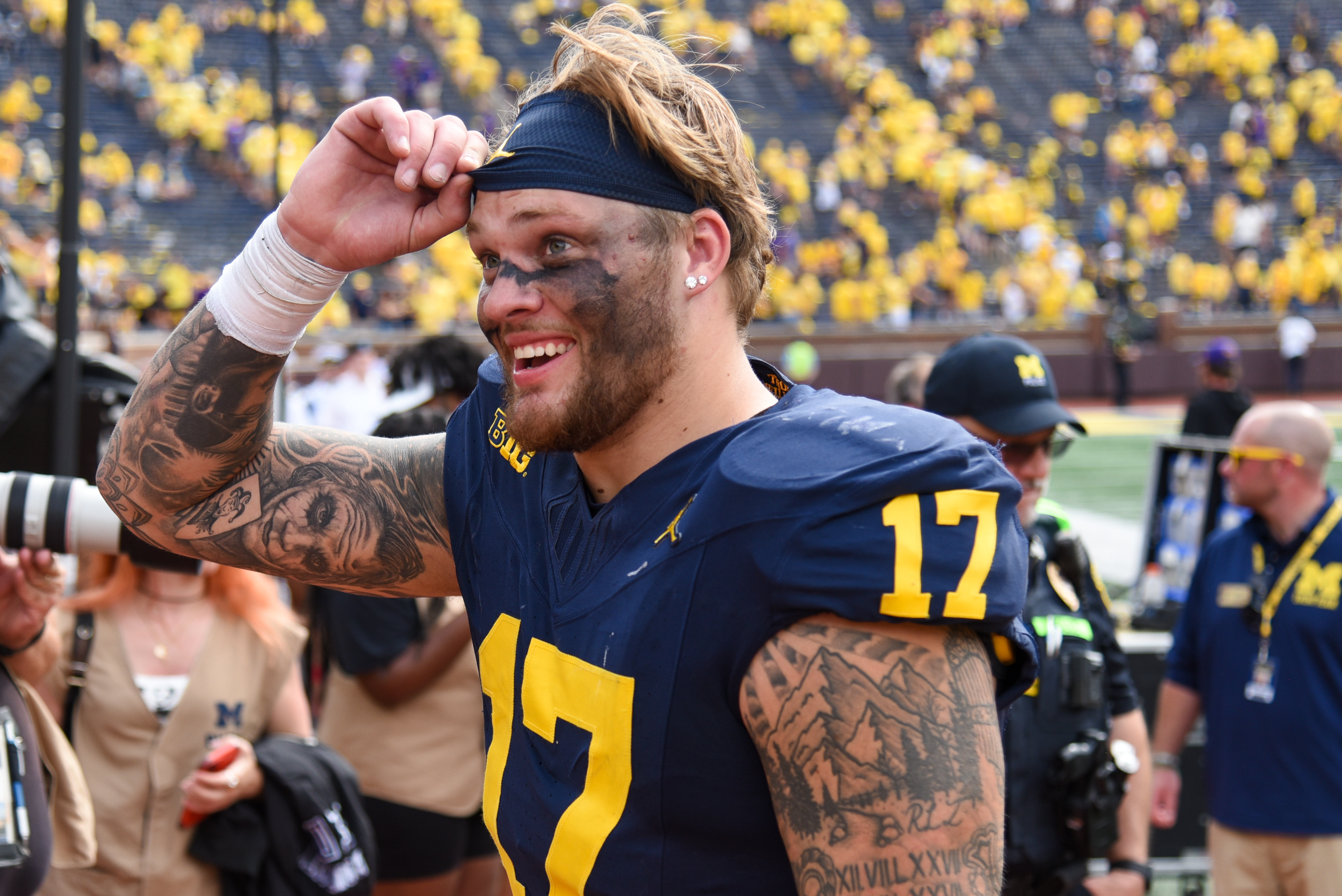
McGregor with Michigan following the 2023 season opening game

McGregor enrolled at the University of Michigan in 2020. After tearing his MCL, PCL, and meniscus in his right knee during his senior year in high school, McGregor did not play while rehabilitating the knee during his freshman year.

In 2021, as a sophomore, he appeared in nine games as a backup defensive end and special teams member and recorded five tackles.

As a junior in 2022, he appeared in all 14 games and started three games. On September 17, 2022, McGregor started in his first game against UConn. McGregor totaled 17 tackles, five tackles for a loss and 2.5 sacks. His first career sack came on a shared sack in the season opener against Colorado State, on September 3.

As a senior in 2023, McGregor became a full time starter at defensive end, starting all 15 games and winning a national championship with Michigan. He contributed 26 tackles, 9 tackles for loss and 4.5 sacks on the season. On January 1, 2024, in the Rose Bowl, McGregor had two sacks on Alabama’s Jalen Milroe. Following the season, he was named All-Big Ten honorable mention.

== Professional career ==
Pre-draft measurables
Height	Weight	Arm length	Hand span	Wingspan	40-yard dash	10-yard split	20-yard split	20-yard shuttle	Vertical jump	Broad jump	Bench press
6 ft 5 1/4 in (1.96 m)	257 lb (117 kg)	33 1/8 in (0.84 m)	10 in (0.25 m)	6 ft 8 1/4 in (2.04 m)	4.77 s	1.63 s	2.75 s	4.63 s	33.0 in (0.84 m)	9 ft 8 in (2.95 m)	20 reps
All values from NFL Combine/Pro Day

On April 27, 2024, McGregor signed with the New York Jets as an undrafted free agent. McGregor made the Jets' initial 53 man roster out of training camp.
