= The Order of Myths =

- Theatrical release poster
- Directed by: Margaret Brown
- Written by: Margaret Brown
- Produced by: Margaret Brown; Sara Cross; Steve Bannatyne
- Cinematography: Michael Simmonds
- Edited by: Michael Taylor; Margaret Brown; Geoffrey Richman
- Distributed by: The Cinema Guild
- Release dates: January 19, 2008 (Sundance Film Festival); July 25, 2008 (United States)
- Running time: 79 minutes
- Country: United States
- Language: English

The Order of Myths is a 2008 documentary film directed by Margaret Brown. It focuses on the Mardi Gras celebrations in Mobile, Alabama, the oldest in the United States. It reveals the separate mystic societies established and maintained by Black and White groups, and acknowledges the complex racial history of a city with a slaveholding past.

While showing the mystic societies' ties to economic, class and racial stratification, the film showed the beginnings of interaction between the Black and White courts. It tells some of the history of Africatown, a community formed north of Mobile in 1860 by Africans from Ghana, transported illegally as slaves to Mobile decades after the end of the slave trade.

The film competed in the Documentary Competition at the 2008 Sundance Film Festival. It had a limited release in New York in July 2008, and ran on Independent Lens, a PBS series featuring independent films, in 2009. It was distributed by The Cinema Guild.

== Critical reception ==
The film appeared on several critics' top-ten lists of the best films of 2008. Andrew O'Hehir of Salon named it the 9th-best film of 2008, as did Ella Taylor of LA Weekly (along with Moving Midway) and Wesley Morris of The Boston Globe. It also won a Peabody Award in 2010.
