= Steve Bannatyne =

American film producer

- Born: 1970 (age 54–55); Muskegon, Michigan
- Citizenship: United States of America
- Education: Grand Valley State University
- Occupation: Film producer
- Years active: 1995-present
- Notable work: If a Tree Falls; Z for Zachariah

Steve Bannatyne (born 1970) is an American film producer, best known for his work on the films If a Tree Falls: A Story of the Earth Liberation Front and Z for Zachariah.

== Early life ==
Steve Bannatyne was born to Jim and Sue Bannatyne in Muskegon, Michigan in 1970 and graduated from Port Huron High School. He attended film school at Grand Valley State University and then moved to Toronto in 1995 to pursue a career in film. He later moved to San Francisco and got his first significant job as a production assistant on the 1999 film, Bicentennial Man.

== Career ==
After working in film in San Francisco, Bannatyne co-formed a production company, Lucky Hat Entertainment, in 2007. In 2008, he co-executive produced The Order of Myths, which earned Bannatyne a Peabody Award in 2009. That year, Lucky Hat and IndiePix Films also entered an agreement to produce six films over three years. The first two, P-Star Rising and Entre Nos, premiered that year at the Tribeca Film Festival.

Through Lucky Hat, Bannatyne produced the 2011 film, If a Tree Falls: A Story of the Earth Liberation Front. The film premiered at the 2011 Sundance Film Festival, winning " Best Documentary Editing" and was nominated for an Oscar for Best Documentary.

In 2015, Z for Zachariah premiered at Sundance, although Bannatyne had been developing the film since 2009. It was the largest budget film he had worked on at that point. Bannatyne was also a producer on the 2015 film Manson Family Vacation. In 2016, he produced the documentary Night School, which premiered at the Tribeca Film Festival.

Bannatyne has produced multiple documentaries about his home state of Michigan. The Russian Five (2019) told the story of the first five Russians to play hockey together in the NHL for the Detroit Red Wings. Boblo Boats (2022) covers the history of the Boblo Island Amusement Park. Bannatyne's grandfather was the captain of the SS Columbia, the ship that carried passengers to the island.

Bannatye has also worked in film distribution. In addition to distribution for The Russian Five, Lucky Hat Entertainment was one of two companies that handled distribution for the 2020 documentary Runner. In 2022, they distributed Boblo Boats with a regional release to 20 theaters in the Midwest, followed by a release on streaming platforms.

== Filmography ==
Year	Title	Role	Director	Notes
1999	Bicentennial Man	Production Assistant	Chris Columbus	
2001	Sweet November	Production Assistant	Pat O'Connor	
2008	The Order of Myths	Co-Executive Producer	Margaret Brown	
2009	Everything Strange and New	Executive Producer	Frazer Bradshaw	
2009	P-Star Rising	Executive Producer		
2009	Entre Nos	Executive Producer		
2011	If a Tree Falls: A Story of the Earth Liberation Front	Executive Producer	Marshall Curry	
2012	Informant	Producer	Jamie Meltzer	
2014	Ping-Pong Summer	Producer	Michael Tuly	
2015	Z for Zachariah	Executive Producer	Craig Zobel	
2015	Manson Family Vacation	Producer	J. Davis	
2019	The Russian Five	Producer/Distributor	Joshua Riehl	
2020	Runner	Distributor	Bill Gallagher	
2022	Boblo Boats	Producer/Distributor	Aaron Shillinger	
