= Clintondale Community Schools =

School district in Michigan

Address
- 31500 Little Mack Avenue Clinton Township, Macomb County, Michigan, 48035; United States

District information
- Grades: PreKindergarten–12
- Schools: 6
- Budget: $35,975,000 2022–2023 expenditures
- NCES District ID: 2610080

Students and staff
- Students: 1,677 (2024–2025)
- Teachers: 89.8 (on an FTE basis) (2024–2025)
- Staff: 195.84 FTE (2024–2025)
- Student–teacher ratio: 18.67 (2024–2025)
- District mascot: Dragons

Other information
- Website: www.clintondaleschools.net

Clintondale Community Schools is a public school district in Macomb County, Michigan, in the Metro Detroit area. It serves part of Clinton Township.

== History ==
The first section of Clintondale Middle/High School was completed in April 1957. An addition, designed by architect Linn Smith and Associates, was built around 1966.

Around 2011, Clintondale High School adopted a flipped classroom curriculum school wide. In a flipped classroom, schoolwork and assignments traditionally done as homework are done in class, and students view lectures and lessons online at home.

== Schools ==
Schools in Clintondale Community Schools
School	Address	Notes
Clintondale High School	32500 Little Mack Avenue, Clinton Township	Grades 9–12
Clintondale Middle School	35200 Little Mack Avenue, Clinton Township	Grades 6-8
McGlinnen Elementary	21415 Sunnyview, Clinton Township	Grades K-5
Parker Elementary	22055 Quinn Road, Clinton Township	Grades K-5
Icampus Virtual Learning School		Online learning option for grades 6-12.
Rainbow Early Childhood Center	33749 Wurfel, Clinton Township	PreK-K
