= Port Huron Area School District =

School district

Address
- 2720 Riverside Dr. Port Huron, St. Clair, Michigan, 48060; United States

District information
- Type: Public school district
- Grades: Prekindergarten-12
- Superintendent: Theo Kerhoulas
- Schools: 16
- Budget: $118,752,000 2022-2023 expenditures
- NCES District ID: 2628830

Students and staff
- Students: 6,983 (2024-2025)
- Teachers: 463.72 FTE (2024-2025)
- Staff: 894.69 FTE (2024-2025)
- Student–teacher ratio: 15.06 (2024-2025)

Other information
- Website: www.phasd.us

The Port Huron Area School District is a public school district in the U.S. state of Michigan, serving the city of Port Huron, and parts of Burtchville Township, Clyde Township, Grant Township, Fort Gratiot Township, Kimball Township, Port Huron Township, and Wales Township.

== Schools ==
School	Address	Notes
Elementary schools
Cleveland	2801 Vanness Street, Port Huron	
Crull	2615 Hancock, Port Huron	
Garfield	1221 Garfield, Port Huron	
Indian Woods	4975 West Water, Kimball Township	
Keewahdin	4801 Lakeshore Road, Fort Gratiot Township	
Michigamme	2855 Michigan Road, Port Huron	
Roosevelt	1112 20th Street, Port Huron	
Thomas Edison	3559 Pollina Avenue, Fort Gratiot Township	
Woodrow Wilson	834 Chestnut, Port Huron	
Middle schools
Central	200 32nd Street, Port Huron	
Fort Gratiot	3985 Keewahdin, Fort Gratiot Township	
Holland Woods	1617 Holland Avenue, Port Huron	
High schools
Port Huron	2215 Court, Port Huron	Built 1957
Port Huron Northern	1799 Krafft, Port Huron	
Centers
Early Childhood Center	2400 Garfield Street, Port Huron	
Phoenix Academy	1109 20th Street, Port Huron	Shares a building with Port Huron High School
Adult Education Center	55 15th Street - Entrance F, Port Huron	

=== Closed Schools ===
- Kimball Elementary closed 2019
- Lakeport Elementary closed 2014
- Sparlingville Elementary closed 2010
- Chippewa Middle School 2011
- Jefferson Adult Learning Center closed 2009
- Grant Learning Center Closed 2010
- Washington Junior High closed 1980
- Central High School closed 1980
