= Port Huron Northern High School =

Location
- 1799 Krafft Road; Port Huron, Michigan 48060; United States; 43°1′27″N 82°26′41″W

Information
- School type: Public
- Founded: 1965
- School district: Port Huron Area School District
- Principal: Alycia Shagena
- Teaching staff: 52.50 (FTE)
- Grades: 9-12
- Enrollment: 1,089 (2024-2025)
- Student to teacher ratio: 20.74
- Area: Suburban
- Colors: blue and gold
- Athletics conference: Macomb Area Conference
- Nickname: Huskies
- Website: www.phasd.us/o/phnhs

Port Huron Northern High School (PHN; Northern) is a high school located in Port Huron, Michigan, United States. It is part of the Port Huron Area School District and serves grades 9–12.

== Demographics ==
The demographic breakdown of the 1,264 students enrolled in 2014-2015 was:

- Male - 50.2%
- Female - 49.8%
- Native American/Alaskan - 1.1%
- Asian/Pacific islanders - 1.9%
- Black - 4.3%
- Hispanic - 2.9%
- White - 88.7%
- Multiracial - 1.4%

22.5% of the students were eligible for free lunch.

== Athletics ==
The Port Huron Northern Huskies colors are blue and gold. They compete in the Macomb Area Conference. The following MHSAA sanctioned sports are offered:

- Baseball (boys')
- Basketball (girls' and boys')
- Bowling (girls' and boys')
  - Boys' state championship - 2007
- Competitive cheer (girls' and boys')
- Cross country (girls' and boys')
- Football (girls' and boys')
- Golf (girls' and boys')
- Gymnastics (girls' and boys')
- Ice hockey (boys')
- Lacrosse (boys')
- Soccer (girls' and boys')
- Softball (girls')
- Swim and dive (girls' and boys')
- Tennis (girls' and boys')
  - Girls' state championship - 1996, 1997, 1999, 2000, 2002, 2013
- Track and field (girls' and boys')
- Volleyball (girls' and boys')
- Wrestling (girls' and boys')

== Facilities ==
=== Performing arts center ===
The school auditorium was rebuilt in 2005 and rededicated as a performing arts center. The expansion cost $7 million, and the expanded center can seat 650 people. The performing arts center is almost identical to the one at Port Huron High School, but the interior colors are different.

=== Radio station ===
The school radio station is WORW, which broadcasts on the FM band at 91.9 MHz.

== Notable alumni ==
- Braiden McGregor (class of 2020) — NFL defensive end
- Gayle Wright (class of 1969) — former member of the Pennsylvania House of Representatives (2001–2002)
