= Sterling Heights High School =

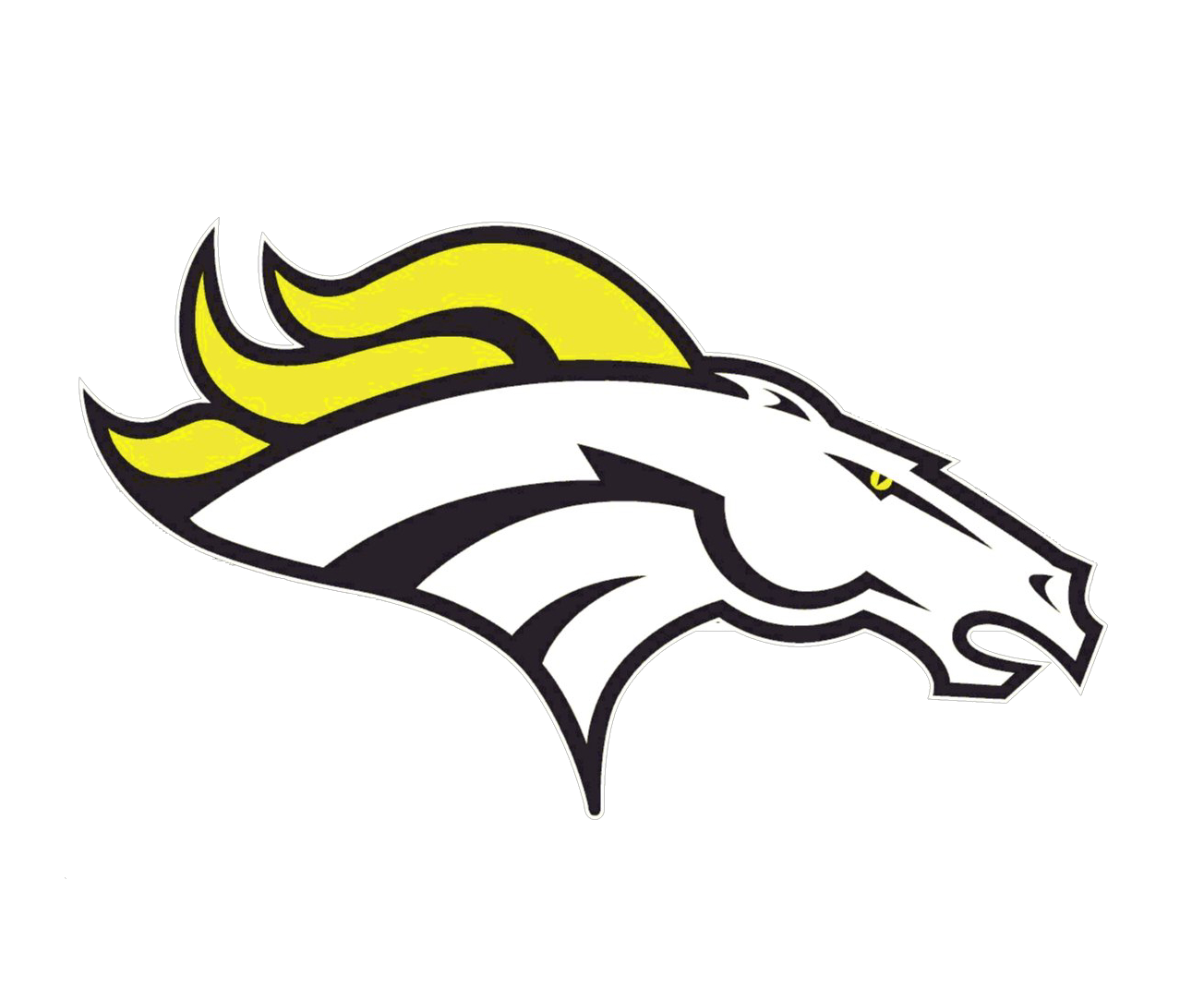

Location
- 12901 15 Mile Road; Sterling Heights, Michigan 48312; United States; 42°33′14″N 82°59′49″W

Information
- Type: Public high school
- Established: 1971
- School district: Warren Consolidated Schools
- NCES District ID: 2635190
- NCES School ID: 263519007112
- Principal: Craig Miller
- Teaching staff: 66.60 (on an FTE basis)
- Grades: 9-12
- Enrollment: 1,327 (2023–2024)
- Student to teacher ratio: 19.92
- Colors: Black and gold
- Athletics conference: Macomb Area Conference
- Nickname: Stallions
- Website: shhs.wcskids.com//

Sterling Heights High School (SHHS) is a public high school in Sterling Heights, Michigan, United States.

== Academics ==
The 2020 U.S. News & World Report survey of high schools ranked Sterling Heights 6,162nd nationally and 214th in Michigan.

As of 2026, the school is teaching Geometry, Biography, Math, and Economics. The School also house's the District's Special Education Program Mild Cognitive Impairment (MICI).

== Awards ==
In 2015 Sterling Heights High School was one of 68 schools in Michigan to be given the silver medal designation by US News and World Report.

== Demographics ==
The demographic breakdown of the 1,472 students enrolled for 2018-19 was:

- Male - 50.7%
- Female - 49.3%
- Native American/Alaskan - 0.1%
- Asian - 9.8%
- Black - 10.9%
- Hispanic - 2.0%
- Native Hawaiian/Pacific islanders - >0.1%
- White - 76.2%
- Multiracial - 0.8%

69.1% of the students were eligible for free or reduced-cost lunch.

== Athletics ==
The Sterling Heights Stallions compete in the Macomb Area Conference. School colors are black and gold. The following Michigan High School Athletic Association (MHSAA) sanctioned sports are offered:

- Baseball (boys)
- Basketball (girls and boys)
- Bowling (girls and boys)
- Competitive cheerleading (girls)
- Cross country (girls and boys)
- Football (boys)
- Golf (boys)
- Lacrosse (boys)
- Soccer (girls and boys)
- Softball (girls)
- Swim and dive (girls and boys)
- Tennis (girls and boys)
- Track and field (girls and boys)
- Volleyball (girls)
- Wrestling (boys)

== Notable alumni ==
- Dave Borkowski, Major League Baseball (MLB) pitcher
- Mark Hackel, politician
- Karen A. Page, Jame Beard Award-winning author
- Tom Stanton, New York Times-bestselling author
