= Hazel Park High School =

High school in Michigan, United States

Coordinates: 42.465°N 83.0903°W

Location
- 23400 Hughes Avenue; Hazel Park, (Oakland County), Michigan 48030; United States

Information
- Type: Public high school
- Principal: Tammy Scholz
- Staff: 32.97 (FTE)
- Enrollment: 567 (2024-2025)
- Student to teacher ratio: 17.20
- Colors: Maroon and gray
- Athletics conference: Macomb Area Conference
- Nickname: Vikings
- Website: www.hazelparkschools.org/schools/secondary/hazel-park-high-school

Hazel Park High School is a public high school in Hazel Park, Michigan, United States. The school serves grades 9–12 and is a part of the Hazel Park Schools District. It opened in 1929 at the current site of the junior high school and moved to its current location in 1961. The school has been named a Reward School by the Michigan Department of Education.

== Notable alumni ==
- Bob Welch, Major League Baseball (MLB) pitcher for the Los Angeles Dodgers (1978–87) and Oakland Athletics (1988–94). 1990 AL CY Young Award Winner.
- Danny Smick (1915–1975), professional basketball and minor league baseball player
- Frank Anthony Polito, author and playwright
- Steve Fraser, American Olympic Gold Medalist athlete wrestler and coach
- Joe Roa, former Major League Baseball right-handed pitcher
- Myles Jury, American mixed martial artist
