= Thomas J. Wilson =

American businessman

Thomas Wilson
- Born: 1957 or 1958 (age c. 67); St. Clair Shores, Michigan, United States
- Education: University of Michigan (BBA); Northwestern University (MBA)
- Occupations: (CEO), The Allstate Corporation

Thomas J. Wilson (born 1957 or 1958) is chairman, chief executive officer, and president of The Allstate Corporation. Wilson is also a member of the corporation's board of directors.

== Early life ==
Wilson was born in St. Clair Shores, Michigan. He graduated from Lake Shore High School in 1975. He subsequently earned a Bachelor of Science in Business Administration from the University of Michigan and later earned an MBA from Northwestern University's Kellogg School of Management in 1980.

== Career ==
Wilson held various financial positions at Amoco, where he worked from 1980 to 1986. He was managing director of mergers and acquisitions at Dean Witter Reynolds from 1986 to 1993.

Wilson was formerly chairman and president of Allstate Financial, where he led expansion of financial retirement services. Prior to this role Wilson was Allstate's chief financial officer. Before joining Allstate in 1995 he worked for Sears, Roebuck & Company, where he was vice president of strategy and analysis. He was responsible for strategic planning, financial planning and analysis, and special projects for the corporation. From 2005 to 2006, Wilson was president and chief operating officer of Allstate Corporation, and from 2002 to 2006 he was also president of Allstate Protection. According to salary.com, Wilson received $17.1 million in fiscal year 2017. In 2024, Wilson's total compensation was $26.1 million, up from $16.5 million in 2023.

Wilson is on the boards of the Property Casualty Insurers Association of America and serves as the chairman of the US Chamber of Commerce and is a past chairman of the U.S. Chamber of Commerce board of directors. He is a former board member of World Business Chicago.

== Philanthropy ==
Wilson serves as chairman of the U.S. Chamber of Commerce Foundation and is a past chairman of the U.S. Chamber of Commerce board of directors. He is involved with numerous civic organizations including P33, an initiative focused on accelerating Chicago's leadership in the digital economy; OneTen, a corporate initiative to upskill, hire and promote one million people into family-sustaining jobs; and he co-founded the Get IN Chicago Foundation. to reduce youth violence. He is also a member of the Business Roundtable, CEO Roundtable and the Aspen Economic Strategy Group. He previously served as chair of the Financial Services Roundtable, Property-liability CEO Roundtable, deputy chair of the Federal Reserve Bank of Chicago, and director of State Street Corporation.

He is a member of the board of trustees of Rush University Medical Center as well as a former board member of Francis W. Parker School. He is also a member of the Young Presidents' Organization. Wilson is a Civic Committee member of the Commercial Club of Chicago.

== Personal life ==
In 2017, Wilson and his wife sold their Lincoln Park home of more than two decades for $2.5 million.
