= Madison High School (Michigan) =

High school in Michigan, United States

Coordinates: 42.4917°N 83.0968°W

Location
- 915 East 11 Mile Road; Madison Heights, (Oakland County), Michigan 48071; United States

Information
- Type: Public high school
- Principal: Patricia Perry
- Staff: 15.56 (FTE)
- Enrollment: 244 (2023-2024)
- Student to teacher ratio: 15.68
- Colors: Purple and gold
- Athletics conference: Macomb Area Conference
- Nickname: Eagles
- Website: www.madisondistrict.org/schools/madison-high-school

Student assessments
- 2021–22 school year Change vs. prior year

M-STEP 11th grade proficiency rates (Science / Social Studies)
- Advanced %: ≤5 / ≤5
- Proficient %: ≤5 / –
- PR. Proficient %: ≤5 / 52.7
- Not Proficient %: – / 39.2

Average test scores
- SAT Total: 788.5 (▼ −87.1)

Madison High School is a public high school located in Madison Heights, Oakland County, Michigan, United States. Its mascot is the Eagle. It is a part of Madison District Public Schools.

The original high school was built in 1924 to serve students who had attended the one-room school houses in the southern half of what is now Madison Heights. Its first graduating class, in 1929, consisted of two students. The Madison School District became a graded district in 1925.

The original high school's gymnasium had its first electric scoreboard in 1941, the result of a magazine sale conducted by the Eagles basketball team.

In 1958 the current Madison High School was built; the former high school is now Wilkinson Middle School.

== Notable alumni and faculty ==
- Grady Alderman, former NFL offensive tackle for the Minnesota Vikings
- Renee Ellmers (1982), Republican U.S. Representative of North Carolina's 2nd congressional district
- William James Myers (1937-2017), aka George "The Animal" Steele, professional wrestler, actor, teacher, coach.
