= Clintondale High School =

Location
- 35100 Little Mack Ave. Clinton Township, Michigan 48035; United States
- Coordinates: 42°33′27″N 82°54′31″W

Information
- Type: Public high school
- School district: Clintondale Community Schools
- Principal: Daniel Berry
- Teaching staff: 17.70 (on an FTE basis)
- Grades: 9-12
- Enrollment: 360 (2024-2025)
- Student to teacher ratio: 20.34
- Campus: Suburb, large
- Colors: Blue and gold
- Athletics conference: Macomb Area Conference
- Nickname: Dragons
- Website: highschool.clintondaleschools.net

Clintondale High School is a public school in Clinton Township, Macomb County, Michigan, United States. It is part of Clintondale Community Schools.

The school has 390 students in grades 9–12, with a student-teacher ratio of 17 to 1.
