= Lamphere Public Schools =

School district in Michigan

Address
- 31201 Dorchester Madison Heights, Oakland, Michigan, 48071; United States

District information
- Type: Public school district
- Grades: Prekindergarten-12
- Superintendent: Dale Steen
- Schools: 7
- Budget: $50,409,000 2022-2023 expenditures
- NCES District ID: 2621120

Students and staff
- Students: 2,452 (2024-2025)
- Teachers: 162.3 FTE (2024-2025)
- Staff: 448.13 (FTE) (2024-2025)
- Student–teacher ratio: 15.11 (2024-2025)

Other information
- Website: lamphereschools.org

Lamphere Public Schools is a public school district in Metro Detroit in the U.S. state of Michigan, serving portions of Madison Heights and Troy. It serves the portion of Madison Heights roughly north or Gardenia Avenue, while Madison District Public Schools serves the southern portion.

== History ==
The first Lamphere School was built in 1928 to serve kindergarten through 12th grades.

The school made headlines in fall 1937, when it refused to accept 40 unhoused students who were living in a tent city at the corner of Thirteen Mile Rd. and John R. Rd. The tent city was created by Oakland County as disaster relief for families suffering from the Great Depression. The district claimed it had no resources to accommodate the students and requested three funding proposals to voters, which were denied. The situation was somewhat resolved by the county finding housing for some of the families.

The Lamphere School would be expanded in 1945 with the addition of four new rooms. Because of the relocation of many Detroiters to the suburbs, Lamphere went on a half-day schedule in order to ease overcrowding in 1955, the year Madison Heights incorporated as a city. The next year, Edmonson Elementary was built, and Lamphere School became a junior-senior high school. However, due to a lack of funds needed to hire 17 teachers, both Edmonson Elementary and Lamphere High School went on a half day schedules in 1957. Lamphere High School relocated to the present site of Page Middle School later that year, and two new elementary schools were added: Hiller Elementary occupied the former Lamphere School that year, while Lessenger Elementary, a new building, opened. In 1959, Simonds and Woodland Elementary Schools were built, followed the next year by Sixma Elementary. East Elementary school was built in 1961. The third, and present, Lamphere High School opened in 1961 after only several months of construction, leaving the 6th-through-8th graders as sole occupants of the now-renamed Page Middle School. Lamphere High School would be expanded in 1969 at a cost of $8.5 million with the addition of a performing arts complex consisting of an auditorium and little theater, a swimming pool, greenhouse, a band room, a multipurpose room, additional lockers, three shops and additional classrooms. The high school's library was also expanded. The swimming pool's walls would be adorned in 1994 with a whale mural by its most famous graduate, Robert Wyland.

As Madison Heights' population passed its peak in the 1970s, changes began to be made in the district. Sixma Elementary School closed in 1976 and is now a community center. Woodland Elementary School closed in 1982 and was mostly razed for a public park. Lamphere ended the decade as a participant in the JASON Project, which by 1996 drew 20,000 students from across Michigan. The schools that remained open would undergo renovations and modernizations totaling $35.5 million in 1997, which also brought improved playgrounds to the elementary schools and new technology.

== Schools ==
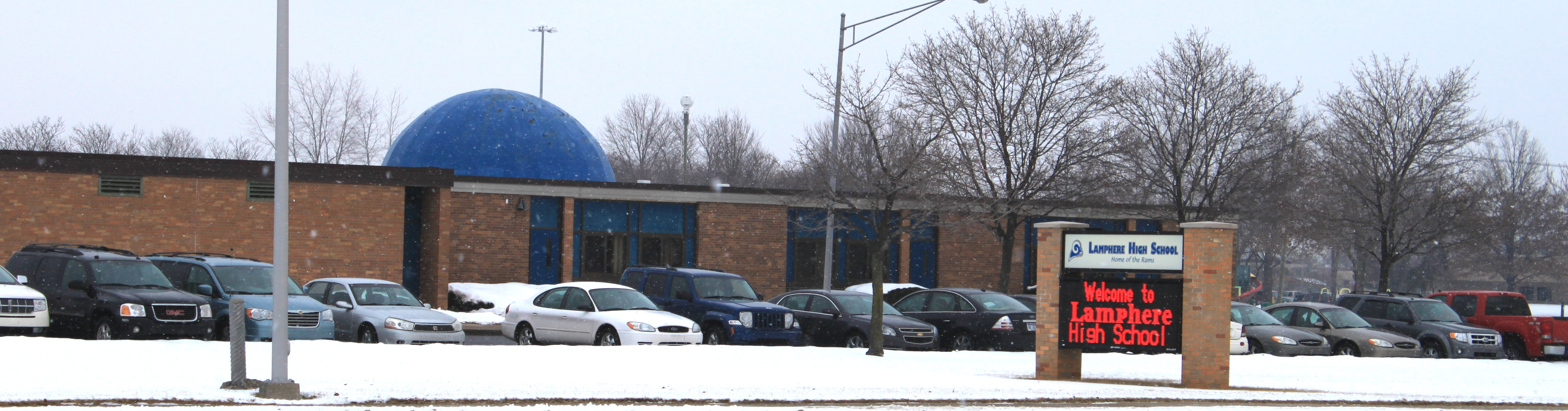
Lamphere High School

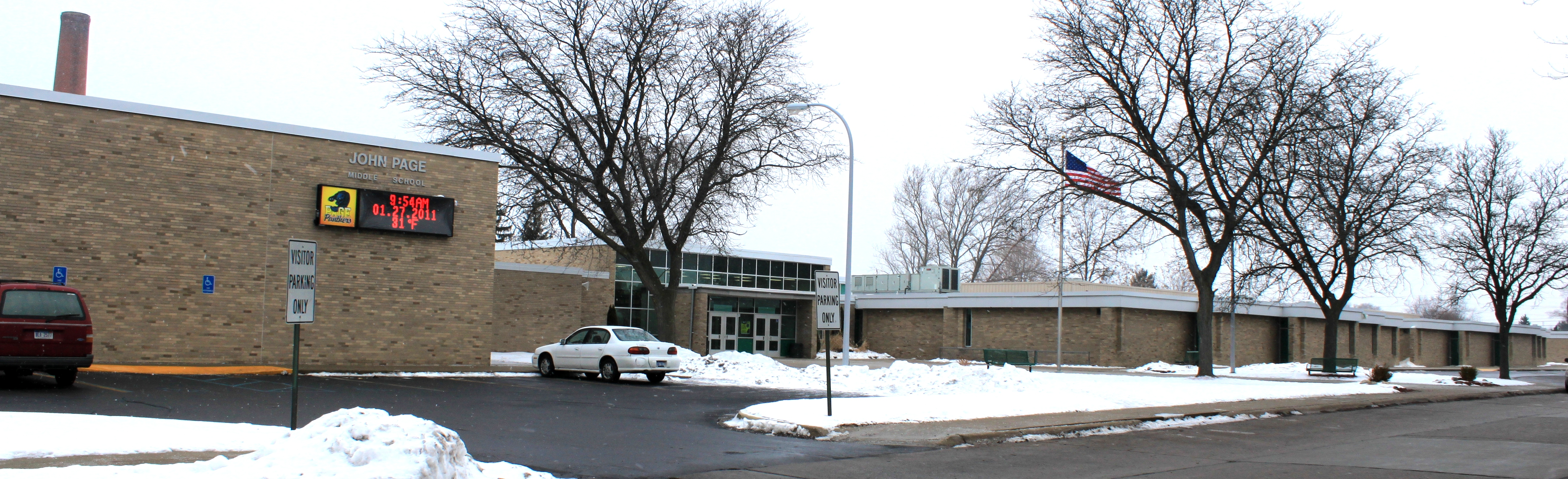
John Page Middle School

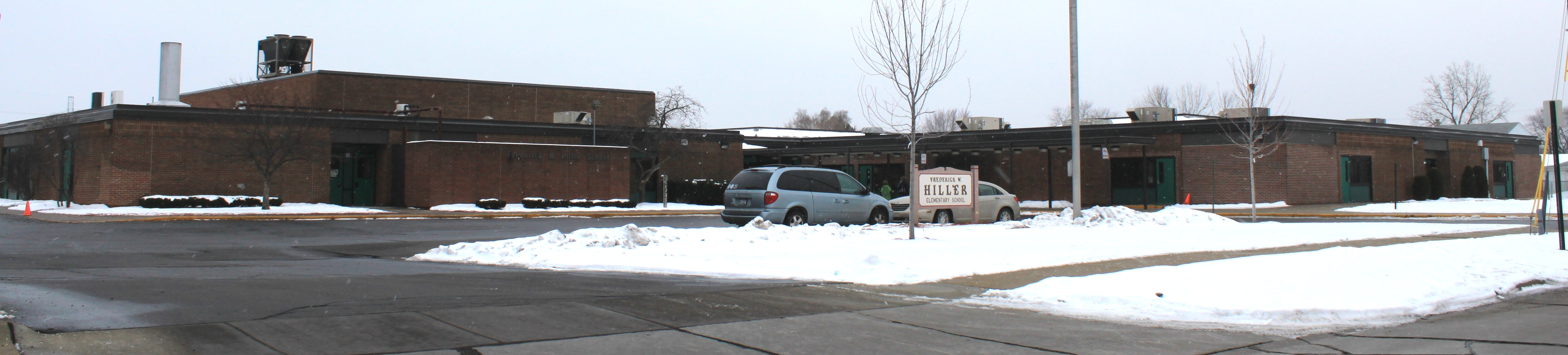
Hiller Elementary School

Schools List
School	Address	Built	Notes
Edmonson Elementary School	621 E Katherine	1956	Elementary school
Hiller Elementary School	400 LeSalle	1969	Elementary school, replaced original Lamphere school built in 1928.
John Page Middle School	29615 Tawas	1957	Middle school
Lamphere Center	29685 Tawas	1957	Special education school, shares a building with John Page Middle School
Lamphere High School	610 W 13 Mile Rd.	1961	High school
Lamphere Learning Ladder	31201 Dorchester		Preschool/daycare program. Shares a building with district administration center
Lessenger Elementary School	30150 Campbell Rd.	1957	Elementary school
Simonds Elementary School	30000 Rose Ave.	1959	Elementary school
