= Grosse Pointe Shores, Michigan =

- City
- Village of Grosse Pointe Shores
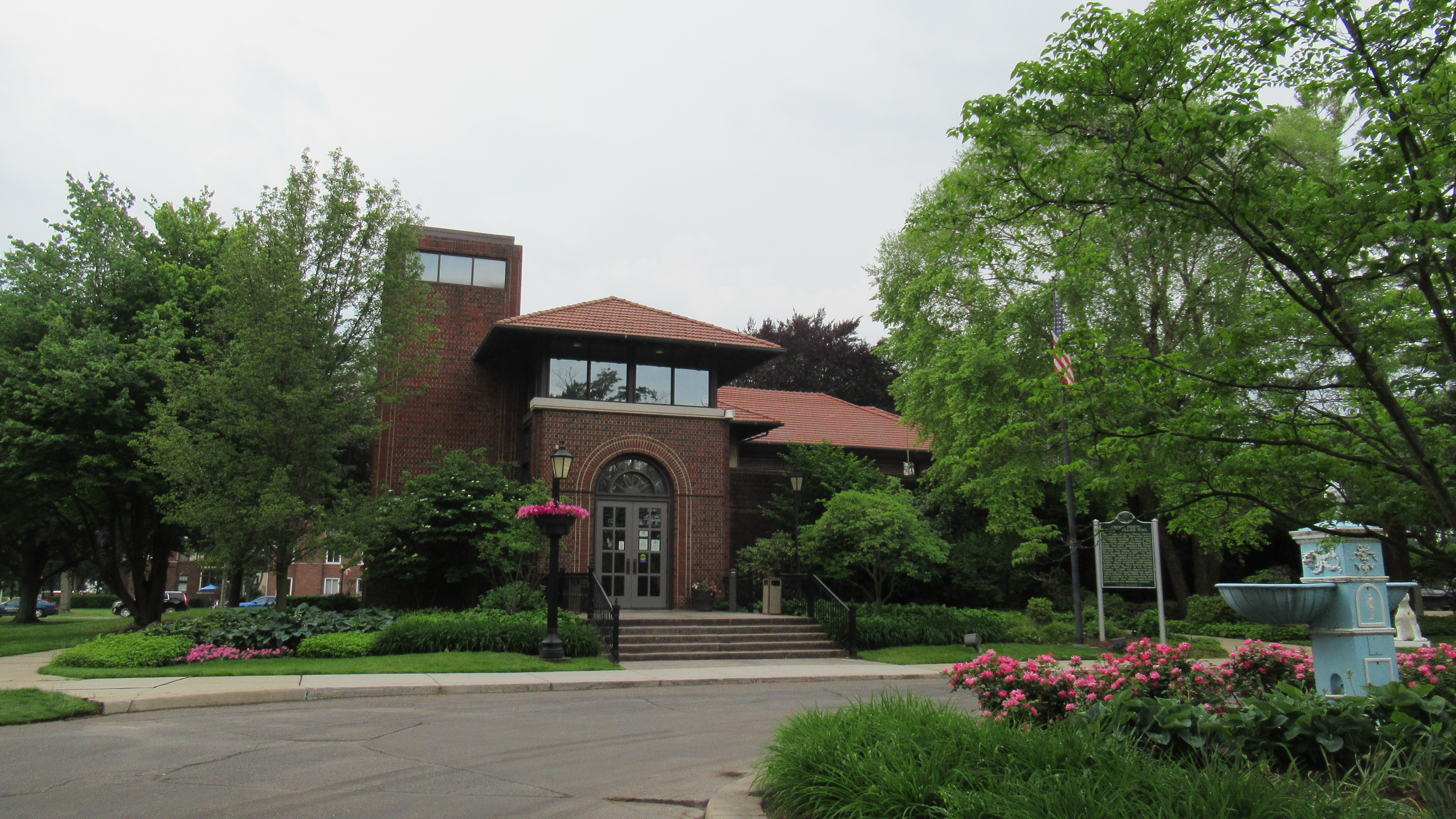
- Grosse Pointe Shores City Hall

- Seal

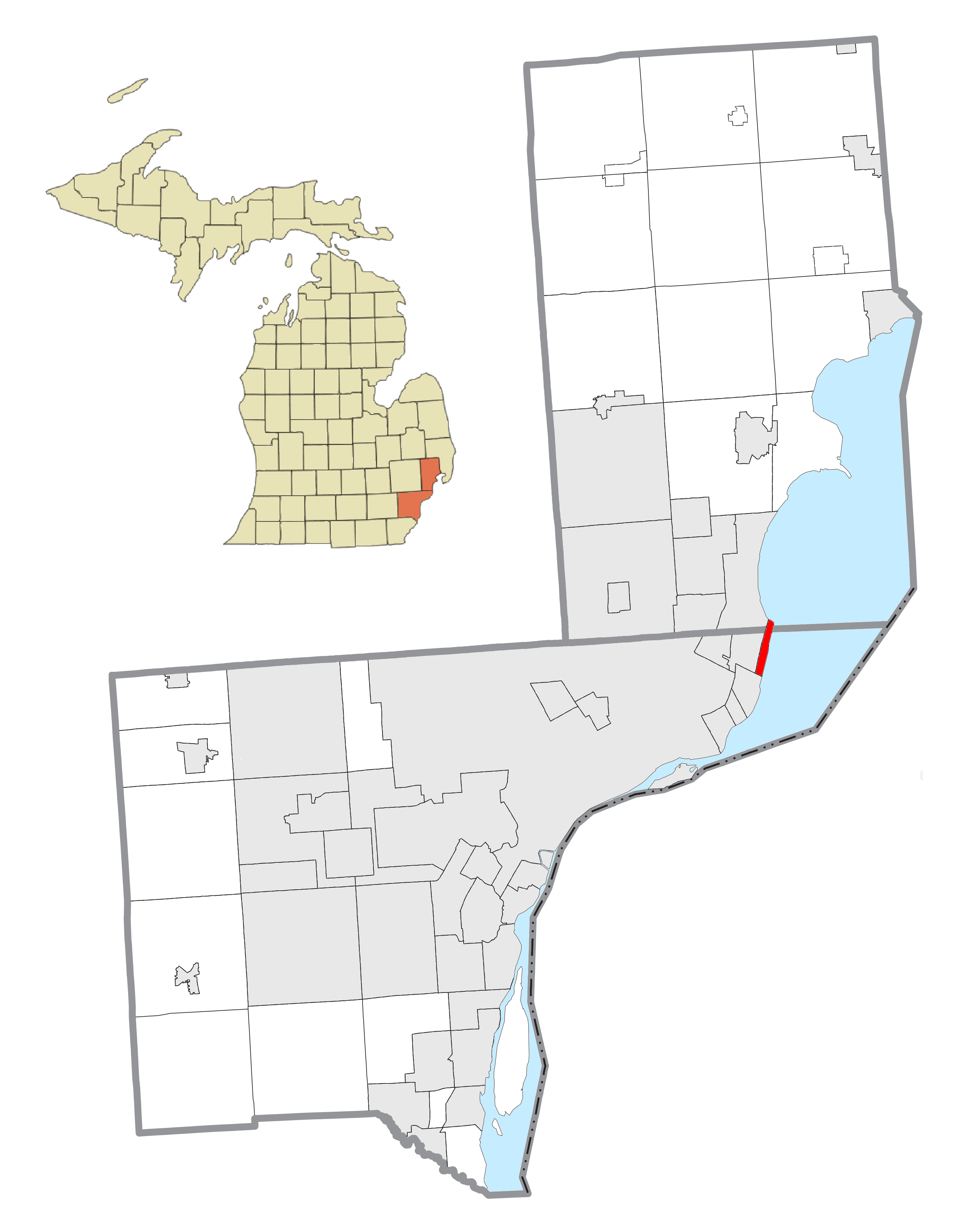
- Location within Macomb County (top) and Wayne County (bottom)

- Location within Michigan Location within the United States
- Coordinates: 42°26′12″N 82°52′36″W
- Country: United States
- State: Michigan
- Counties: Macomb and Wayne
- Incorporated: 1911 (village); 2009 (city)

Government
  - Type: Mayor–council
  - Mayor: Thaddeus Kedzierski
  - Manager: Stephen Poloni
  - Clerk: Bruce Nichols

Area
  - City: 19.08 sq mi (49.41 km^{2})
  - Land: 1.11 sq mi (2.88 km^{2})
  - Water: 17.97 sq mi (46.53 km^{2})
- Elevation: 581 ft (177 m)

Population (2020)
  - City: 2,647
  - Density: 2,380/sq mi (919.1/km^{2})
  - Metro: 4,285,832 (Metro Detroit)
- Time zone: UTC-5 (EST)
  - Summer (DST): UTC-4 (EDT)
- ZIP Code: 48236
- Area code: 313
- FIPS code: 26-82453
- Website: www.gpshoresmi.gov

Grosse Pointe Shores (officially named the Village of Grosse Pointe Shores, a Michigan City) is a city in Wayne and Macomb counties in the U.S. state of Michigan. One of the five "Grosse Pointe" suburbs of Detroit, Grosse Pointe Shores is located on the shore of Lake St. Clair, roughly 13 miles (20.9 km) northeast of downtown Detroit. As of the 2020 census, Grosse Pointe Shores had a population of 2,647, down from 3,008 in 2010.

Grosse Pointe Shores was incorporated as a village in 1911 and was part of Grosse Pointe Township in Wayne County and Lake Township in Macomb County. Both townships became defunct with the village incorporated as a city in 2009. It is a northeastern suburb of Metro Detroit and is the northernmost city included into the Grosse Pointe area, and the only one of the five Grosse Pointes to not border the city of Detroit. Located along the shores of Lake St. Clair, the city is well known as the location of the Edsel and Eleanor Ford House and the Grosse Pointe Yacht Club.

== History ==
Grosse Pointe Shores was incorporated as a village in 1911. The village incorporated as a city in 2009. In 2011, the city government stated that it was considering trying to move all of the city into Macomb County, since Macomb has lower taxes than Wayne.

== Geography ==
Grosse Pointe Shores is in the northeast corner of Wayne County and the southeast corner of Macomb County, with the majority of its land area in Wayne County. The city limits extend east to the center of Lake St. Clair, where it follows the Canadian border. It is bordered to the south by Grosse Pointe Farms and to the west by Grosse Pointe Woods, both in Wayne County, and to the northwest by St. Clair Shores in Macomb County. According to the U.S. Census Bureau, the city has a total area of 19.08 square miles (49.42 km^{2}), of which 1.11 square miles (2.87 km^{2}) are land and 17.97 square miles (46.54 km^{2}), or 94.17%, are water (part of Lake St. Clair).

The city is 12 miles (19 km) northeast of downtown Detroit and the same distance south of Mount Clemens, the Macomb county seat.

== Demographics ==
Village of Grosse Pointe Shores city, Michigan – Racial and ethnic composition Note: the US Census treats Hispanic/Latino as an ethnic category. This table excludes Latinos from the racial categories and assigns them to a separate category. Hispanics/Latinos may be of any race.
Race / Ethnicity (NH = Non-Hispanic)	Pop 2010	Pop 2020	% 2010	% 2020
White alone (NH)	2,747	2,360	91.32%	89.16%
Black or African American alone (NH)	57	30	1.89%	1.13%
Native American or Alaska Native alone (NH)	5	2	0.17%	0.08%
Asian alone (NH)	113	126	3.76%	4.76%
Native Hawaiian or Pacific Islander alone (NH)	0	0	0.00%	0.00%
Other race alone (NH)	2	5	0.07%	0.19%
Mixed race or Multiracial (NH)	28	64	0.93%	2.42%
Hispanic or Latino (any race)	56	60	1.86%	2.27%
Total	3,008	2,647	100.00%	100.00%

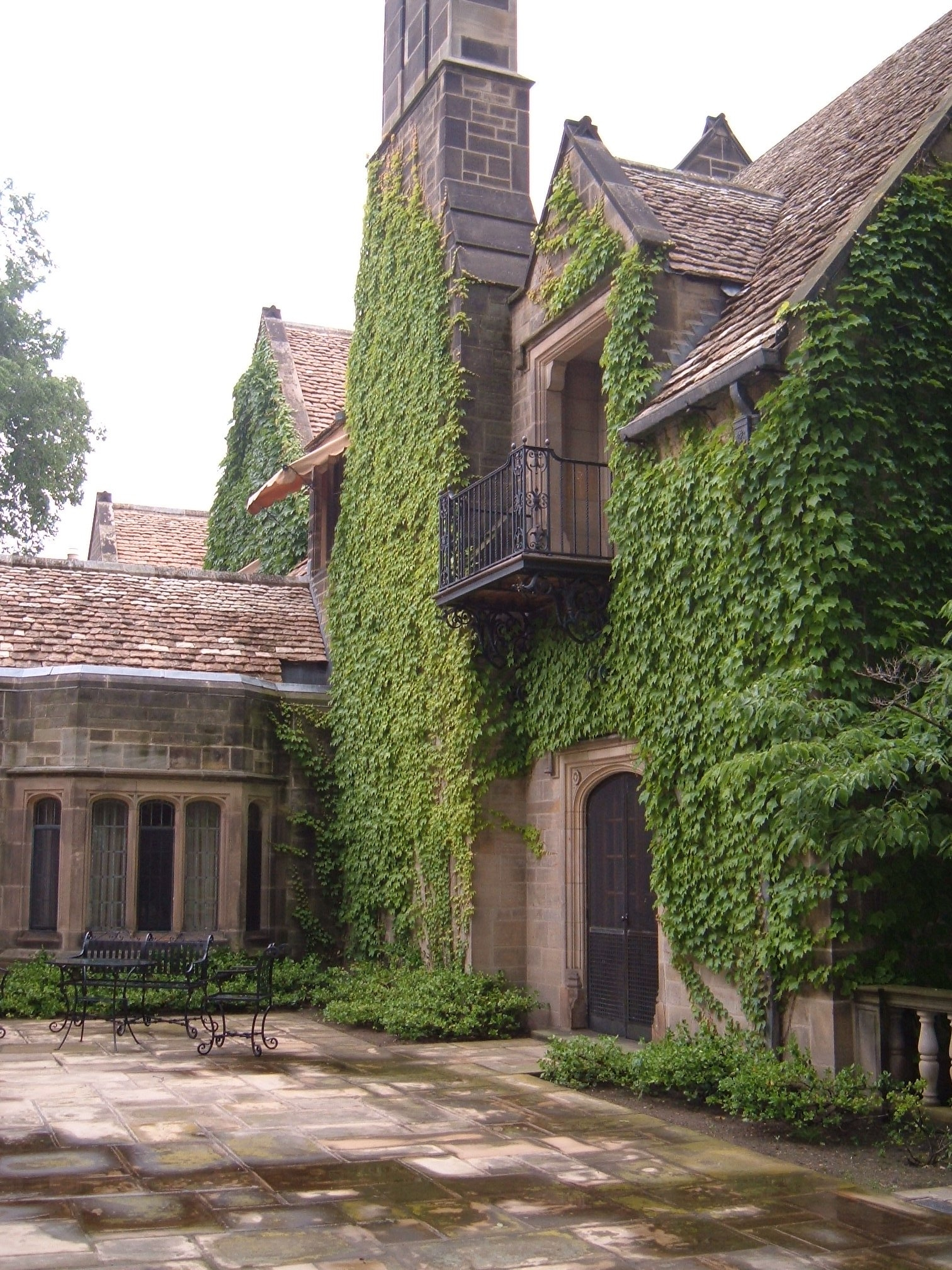
The Edsel and Eleanor Ford House on Lake St. Clair

Historical population
Census	Pop.	Note	%±
1920	519		—
1930	621		19.7%
1940	801		29.0%
1950	1,032		28.8%
1960	2,301		123.0%
1970	3,042		32.2%
1980	3,122		2.6%
1990	2,955		−5.3%
2000	2,823		−4.5%
2010	3,008		6.6%
2020	2,647		−12.0%
U.S. Decennial Census

=== 2010 census ===
As of the census of 2010, there were 3,008 people, 1,201 households, and 911 families residing in the city. The population density was 2,615.7 inhabitants per square mile (1,009.9/km^{2}). There were 1,350 housing units at an average density of 1,173.9 per square mile (453.2/km^{2}). The racial makeup of the city was 92.8% White, 1.9% African American, 0.3% Native American, 3.8% Asian, 0.2% from other races, and 1.0% from two or more races. Hispanic or Latino of any race were 1.9% of the population.

There were 1,201 households, of which 24.6% had children under the age of 18 living with them, 68.0% were married couples living together, 4.8% had a female householder with no husband present, 3.0% had a male householder with no wife present, and 24.1% were non-families. 21.1% of all households were made up of individuals, and 13.6% had someone living alone who was 65 years of age or older. The average household size was 2.50 and the average family size was 2.92.

The median age in the city was 52.2 years. 19.6% of residents were under the age of 18; 5.1% were between the ages of 18 and 24; 14.2% were from 25 to 44; 33.5% were from 45 to 64; and 27.6% were 65 years of age or older. The gender makeup of the city was 50.1% male and 49.9% female.

=== 2000 census ===
As of the census of 2000, there were 2,823 people, 1,058 households, and 859 families residing in the village. The population density was 2,470.6 inhabitants per square mile (953.9/km^{2}). There were 1,096 housing units at an average density of 959.2 per square mile (370.3/km^{2}). The racial makeup of the village was 93.80% White, 0.60% African American, 0.25% Native American, 4.07% Asian, 0.43% from other races, and 0.85% from two or more races. Hispanic or Latino of any race were 1.74% of the population.

There were 1,058 households, out of which 28.1% had children under the age of 18 living with them, 74.5% were married couples living together, 4.6% had a female householder with no husband present, and 18.8% were non-families. 17.1% of all households were made up of individuals, and 12.5% had someone living alone who was 65 years of age or older. The average household size was 2.67 and the average family size was 3.01.

The median income for a household in the village was $222,882, and the median income for a family was $289,680. This makes Grosse Pointe Shores the twenty-first wealthiest city in the United States and the wealthiest in the State of Michigan, for towns with over 1000 residents. Males had a median income of $100,000 versus $59,375 for females. The per capita income for the village was $197,639. About 2.7% of families and 3.0% of the population were below the poverty line, including 4.6% of those under age 18 and 3.4% of those age 65 or over.

== Education ==
The city lies within two separate school districts.

The portion in Wayne County is within the Grosse Pointe Public School System. Residents of the GPPSS area are divided between Ferry Elementary School and Monteith Elementary School, and all residents of that section are zoned to Parcells Middle School and Grosse Pointe North High School; all of these schools are in Grosse Pointe Woods.

The portion of the community in Macomb County is within the South Lake School District.

== Notable people ==
- Edsel Ford, son of Henry Ford, and president of Ford Motor Company
- William Clay Ford Sr., grandson of Henry Ford, son of Edsel Ford
- Marilyn Fisher Lundy, businesswoman and philanthropist
- Manuel Moroun, billionaire businessman, owner of the Ambassador Bridge
- Art Van Elslander, founder of Art Van and philanthropist, lived there for over 20 years.
- Ralph Wilson, founder, owner, and president of the Buffalo Bills
