= Hazel Park Schools =

School district in Michigan

Address
- 1620 E. Elza Hazel Park, Oakland, Michigan, 48030; United States

District information
- Type: Public
- Grades: PreK–12
- Superintendent: Dr. Amy Wilcox
- Schools: 11 schools
- Budget: $67,072,000 expenditures 2022-2023
- NCES District ID: 2618030

Students and staff
- Students: 2,932 (2024–2025)
- Teachers: 200.01 (on an FTE basis) (2024-2025)
- Staff: 549.8 (on an FTE basis) (2024-2025)
- Student–teacher ratio: 14.66 (2024-2025)

Other information
- Website: www.hazelparkschools.org

Hazel Park Schools is a public school district in Metro Detroit in the U.S. state of Michigan, serving Hazel Park and a portion of Ferndale.

== History ==
Hazel Park Schools, then known as Royal Oak Township School District No. 8, was founded in 1884. A one-room schoolhouse was located at the corner of John R. Road and Nine Mile Road. It remained the only school in the district in 1920. The district then began to grow rapidly, building five schools by 1925. That year, the Detroit Free Press profiled the district:

That portion of Detroit's environs which lies north of the Eight-Mile road and east of Woodward Avenue has had the most rapid educational growth in point of enrollment and facilities of any school district in the country, with the exception of one Massachusetts district... Enrollment for 1924 reached a total of 1,476, while the total for 1925 is estimated at 2,500... Hazel Park High School, at the intersection of North John R., Stephenson superhighway and the Nine-Mile road, is a four-year school and is on the accredited list of the state universities.

— Detroit Free Press, May 10, 1925

At the site of Hazel Park Junior High, a high school was built in 1929. It became Beecher Junior High when the current high school opened in March 1960. In 1961, Michigan Attorney General Paul L. Adams stated that the district could not charge fees to rent textbooks, which the district sought to do to ease a budget crisis.

In January 2004, Webb and Beecher Junior Highs merged within the new junior high school building. It was built with funds from a 2002 bond issue, which also paid for the replacement of United Oaks Elementary, the demolition of Clark Elementary and Beecher Junior High, the conversion of Webb Junior High into Webb Elementary, and other renovation projects.

As part of that bond issue, the entrance gate of the football stadium was rebuilt using the stone lintel and clock from the 1929 high school, which was designed by the architectural firm Burrowes and Eurich.

== Schools ==
List of Schools
School	Address	Notes
Edison School	1650 Mapledale, Ferndale	Center-based program for emotional or behavioral disabilities. Renovated 2019
Hazel Park High School	23400 Hughes St., Hazel Park	Grades 9-12. Opened March 1960.
Hazel Park Junior High School	22770 Highland Ave., Hazel Park	Grades 6-8. Opened January 2004.
Hoover Elementary School	23720 Hoover Ave., Hazel Park	Elementary
INVEST Roosevelt Alternative High School	24131 S. Chrysler Dr., Hazel Park	Alternative high school
Jardon Vocational School	2200 Woodward Heights, Ferndale	Post-secondary
United Oaks Elementary School	1001 East Harry Ave., Hazel Park	Elementary. Opened fall 2004.
Webb Elementary School	2100 Woodward Heights Ave., Ferndale	Elementary
Webster Early Childhood Center	431 W Jarvis Ave., Hazel Park	Preschool
