= South Lake Schools =

Public school in Michigan, United States

Address
- 23101 Stadium Boulevard St. Clair Shores, Macomb County, Michigan, 48080; United States

District information
- Motto: Learn today, lead tomorrow.
- Grades: Pre-Kindergarten-12
- Superintendent: Theodore VonHiltmayer
- Schools: 4
- Budget: $27,608,000 2022-2023 expenditures
- NCES District ID: 2632220

Students and staff
- Students: 1,406 (2024-2025)
- Teachers: 89.08 (on an FTE basis) (2024-2025)
- Staff: 236.51 FTE (2024-2025)
- Student–teacher ratio: 15.78 (2024-2025)

Other information
- Website: www.solake.org

South Lake Schools is a public school district in Metro Detroit. It serves the southern part of St. Clair Shores, the eastern part of Eastpointe, and the section of Grosse Pointe Shores within Macomb County.

== History ==
The first South Lake school opened in 1898. At the time, it was within the former Lake Township.

The district faced a crisis in 1944 when the Edsel and Eleanor Ford House estate, a major source of tax revenue for the district, was subdivided after the death of Edsel Ford.

On the night of December 28, 1953, three boys discovered a fire in the high school and put it out themselves, saving the building. They had come to the school to play in the gym, but the building was closed. They saw smoke coming from the building, broke in, and extinguished the flames in a custodial closet with an indoor fire hose. They were lauded by the fire fighters when they arrived.

South Lake High School was built in 1927 and designed by George Haas. The current high school, designed by Wakely Kushner Associates, was built around 1960, and the 1927 section was ultimately torn down.

== Schools ==
Schools in South Lake Schools district
School	Address	Notes
South Lake High School	21900 East Nine Mile Road, St. Clair Shores	Grades 9-12
South Lake Middle School	21621 California, St. Clair Shores	Grades 6-8
Avalon Elementary School	20000 Avalon, St. Clair Shores	Grades K-2
Elmwood Elementary School	22700 California, St. Clair Shores	Grades 3-5
Koepsell Early Childhood Center	Eastpointe	Preschool
