= Lake Shore Public Schools =

School district in Michigan

Address
- 23055 Masonic Blvd. St. Clair Shores, Macomb, Michigan, 48082; United States

District information
- Motto
- Grades: Pre-Kindergarten-12
- Superintendent: Dr. Joseph DiPonio
- Schools: 6
- Budget: $60,410,000 2022-2023 expenditures
- NCES District ID: 2632670

Students and staff
- Students: 3,262 (2024-2025)
- Teachers: 178.4 (on an FTE basis) (2024-2025)
- Staff: 425.07 FTE (2024-2025)
- Student–teacher ratio: 18.28 (2024-2025)

Other information
- Website: www.lakeshoreschools.org

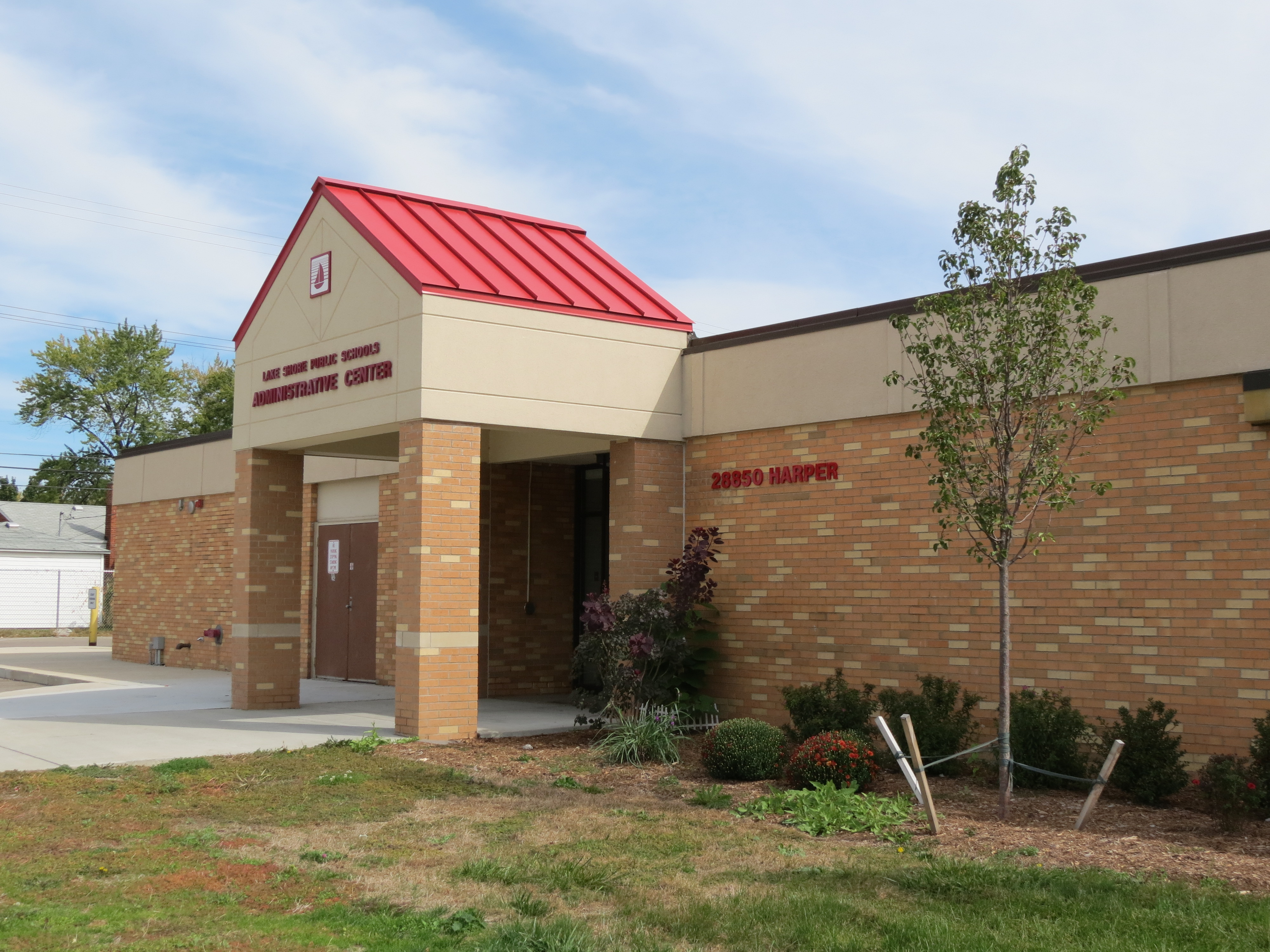
Lake Shore Public Schools Administrative Center

Lake Shore Public Schools is a public school district in the Metro Detroit area. It is one of three school districts in St. Clair Shores, Michigan. Lake Shore is the northernmost district in St. Clair Shores.

== History ==
In 1919, the district's board of education voted to add secondary education to the district. Lake Shore's first graduating class was in 1924. In 1925, a dedicated high school building was built. It quickly became overcrowded and a bond issue to fund expansion was requested two years later. The 1959 Lake Shore High School yearbook had a picture of a new high school.

== International student center ==
Through an agreement with Beijing Haidian Foreign Language Experimental School, a private school in China, the school district hosted Chinese foreign exchange students. In 2011 the private school and school district signed an agreement to work solely with each other lasting 21 years. In 2012 there were 70 Chinese students enrolled at Lake Shore High School. The district charged $13,000 per year for each Chinese student, with $8,411 funding tuition and about $4,000 for other expenses such as busing, lunches at school, field trips, and housing.

The Taylor Building International School and Dorm was used for after school Chinese curriculum classes taught by teachers from Beijing and a dormitory. The dormitory includes motion sensors used at night to separate boys and girls; the private school requested that these sensors be put in place. The Taylor building used a former elementary school that had been last renovated in the 1970s. The district spent $640,000 to convert and renovate the building.

== Schools ==
Schools in Lake Shore Public Schools District
School	Address	Notes
Lake Shore High School	22980 13 Mile Rd.	Grades 9-12
North Lake High School	23340 Elmira St.	Alternative high school. Grades 9-12.
John F. Kennedy Middle School	23101 Masonic Blvd.	Grades 6-8
Masonic Heights Elementary	22100 Masonic Blvd.	Grades K-5
Rodgers Elementary	21601 L'Anse St.	Grades K-5
Violet Elementary	22020 Violet St.	Grades K-5
Lake Shore Early Childhood Center	23340 Elmira St.	Preschool
