= Lake Township, Macomb County, Michigan =

Lake Township, Michigan
- Former civil township
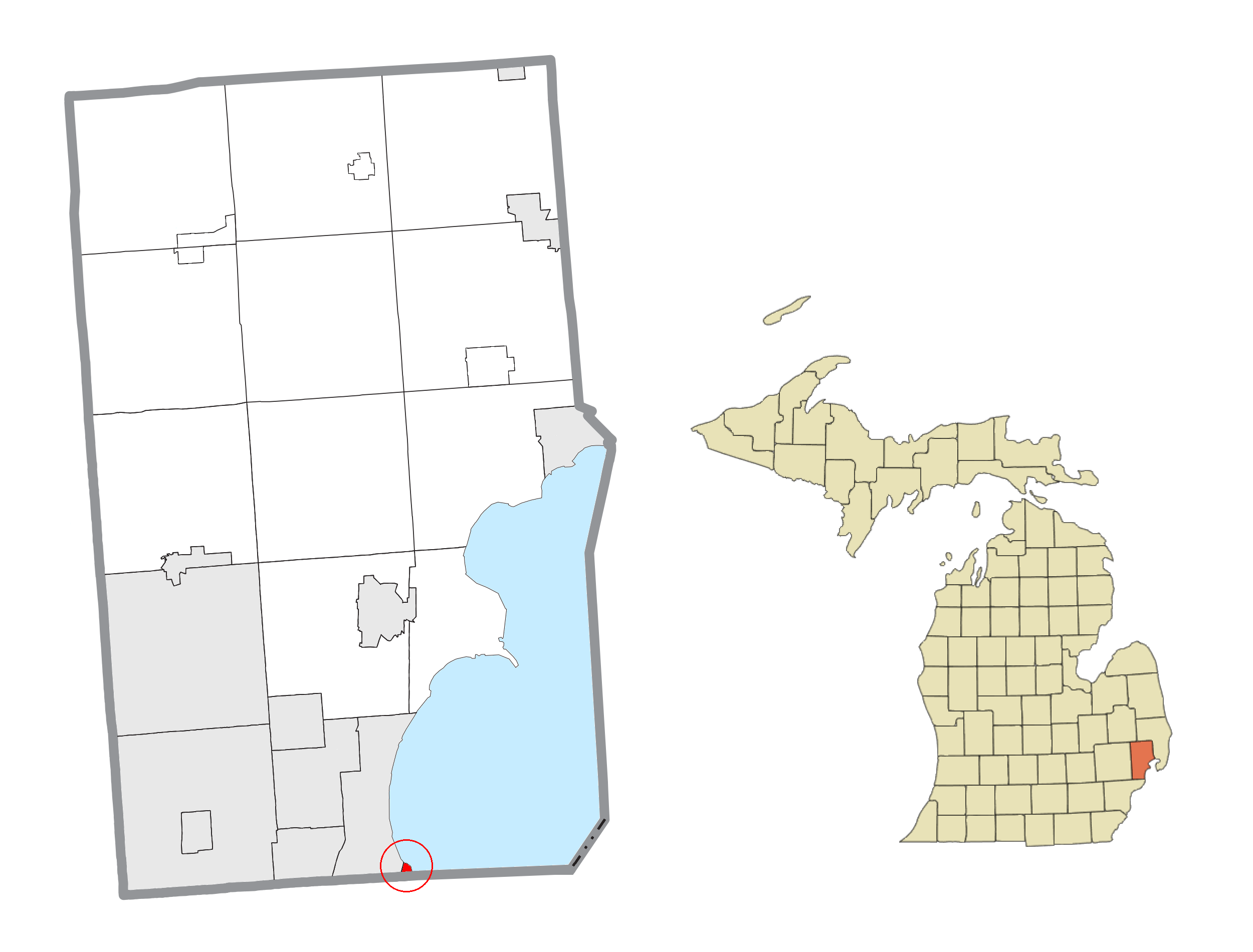
- Former location within Macomb County at the 2000 Census before incorporation as the city of Grosse Pointe Shores in 2009

- Location within the state of Michigan Location within the United States
- Coordinates: 42°27′18″N 82°52′19″W
- Country: United States
- State: Michigan
- County: Macomb
- Organized: 1837
- Disestablished: 2009

Area
  - Total: 0.66 sq mi (1.7 km^{2})
  - Land: 0.15 sq mi (0.4 km^{2})
  - Water: 0.50 sq mi (1.3 km^{2})
- Elevation: 574 ft (175 m)

Population (2000)
  - Total: 80
  - Density: 512/sq mi (197.5/km^{2})
- Time zone: UTC-5 (Eastern (EST))
  - Summer (DST): UTC-4 (EDT)
- FIPS code: 26-44340
- GNIS feature ID: 1626575

Lake Township is a former civil township located in Macomb County in the U.S. state of Michigan. The small township consisted of 0.6 mi^{2} (1.7 km^{2}) of the Macomb County portion of the village of Grosse Pointe Shores, which was part of Grosse Pointe Township and mostly located in Wayne County on the western shores of Lake Saint Clair. At the 2000 census, the township population was 80.

On February 24, 2009, the residents of the village of Grosse Pointe Shores voted to incorporate as a city, effectively disestablishing Lake and Grosse Pointe townships when the city was formally established on April 1, 2009.

At one point, the area of Lake Township was part of the former Erin Township.

== Geography ==
According to the United States Census Bureau, the township has a total area of 0.6 square miles (1.6 km^{2}), of which, 0.2 square miles (0.52 km^{2}) of it is land and 0.5 square miles (1.3 km^{2}) of it (76.56%) is water.

== Demographics ==
As of the census of 2000, there were 80 people, 40 households, and 24 families residing in the township. The population density was 511.5 inhabitants per square mile (197.5/km^{2}). There were 42 housing units at an average density of 268.6 per square mile (103.7/km^{2}). The racial makeup of the township was 88.75% White, 1.25% African American, 2.50% Native American and 7.50% Asian.

There were 40 households, out of which 10.0% had children under the age of 18 living with them, 45.0% were married couples living together, 7.5% had a female householder with no husband present, and 40.0% were non-families. 32.5% of all households were made up of individuals, and 20.0% had someone living alone who was 65 years of age or older. The average household size was 2.00 and the average family size was 2.54.

In the township the population was spread out, with 6.3% under the age of 18, 6.3% from 18 to 24, 12.5% from 25 to 44, 36.3% from 45 to 64, and 38.8% who were 65 years of age or older. The median age was 60 years. For every 100 females, there were 81.8 males. For every 100 females age 18 and over, there were 74.4 males.

The median income for a household in the township was $97,278, and the median income for a family was $117,025. Males had a median income of $100,000 versus $100,000 for females. The per capita income for the township was $64,812. There were no families and 3.8% of the population living below the poverty line, including no under eighteens and 8.7% of those over 64.

== Education ==
South Lake School District once served portions of the township. The district formerly served portions of Lake Township.
