= St. Clair Shores, Michigan =

- City
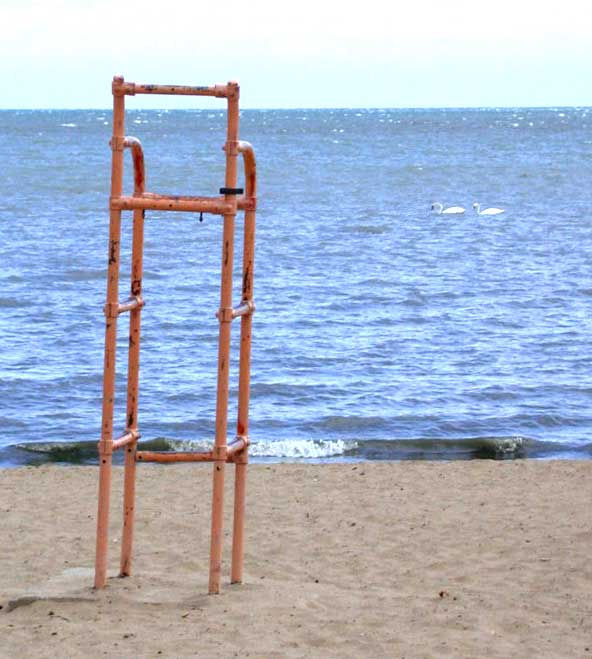
- Photo of a beach in St Clair Shores
- Nicknames: The Shores, SCS, St. Clair
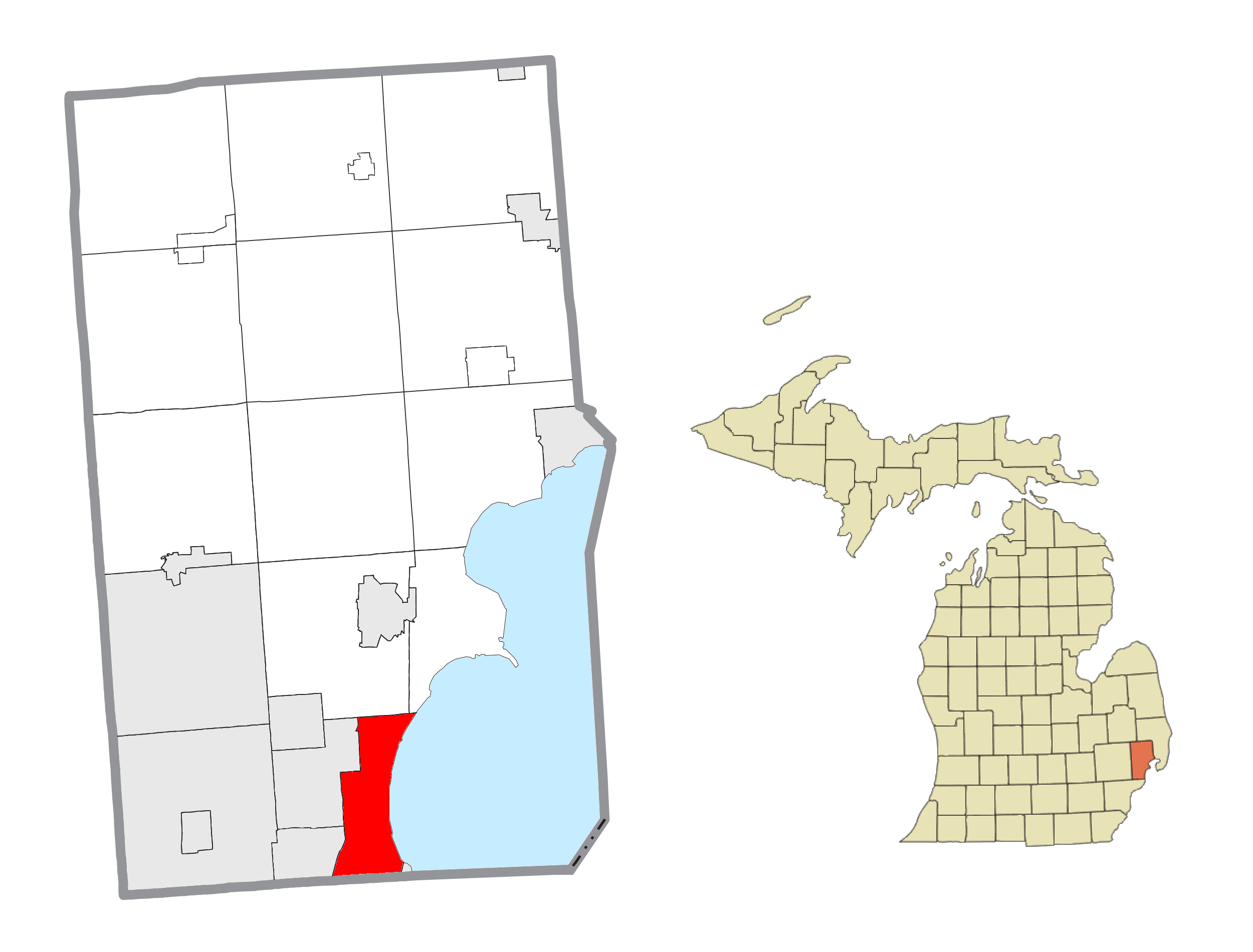
- Location within Macomb County

- Location within Michigan Location within the United States
- Coordinates: 42°29′16″N 82°53′48″W
- Country: United States
- State: Michigan
- County: Macomb

Government
  - Mayor: Kip C. Walby (R)
  - City manager: Dustin Lent

Area
  - Total: 14.40 sq mi (37.30 km^{2})
  - Land: 11.68 sq mi (30.25 km^{2})
  - Water: 2.72 sq mi (7.04 km^{2}) 18.63%
- Elevation: 577 ft (176 m)

Population (2020)
  - Total: 58,874
  - Density: 5,040.3/sq mi (1,946.06/km^{2})
- Time zone: UTC−5 (Eastern (EST))
  - Summer (DST): UTC−4 (EDT)
- ZIP Codes: 48080, 48081, 48082
- Area code: 586
- FIPS code: 26-70760
- GNIS feature ID: 0636601
- Website: scsmi.net

St. Clair Shores is a city in Macomb County in the U.S. state of Michigan. An inner-ring suburb of Detroit, St. Clair Shores is located roughly 14 miles (22.5 km) northeast of downtown Detroit. As of the 2020 census, the city had a population of 58,874.

== History ==
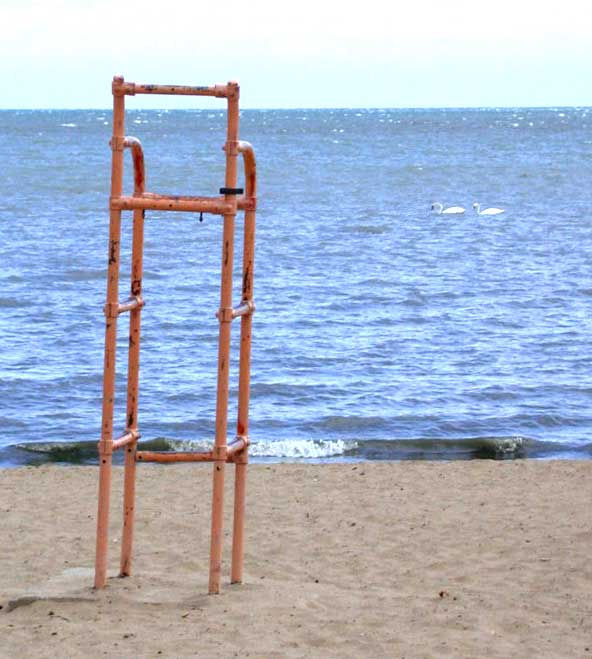
A public beach in St. Clair Shores

Located along the shores of Lake St. Clair and inhabited by French settlers as early as 1710, during which time the area was referred to as L'anse Creuse, the future St. Clair Shores would remain mainly a rural farming area populated by largely French and German immigrant families into the early 20th century. These local family surnames have survived into the 21st century and can be found in the surnames of current residents and among numerous residential street names.

From 1835 until 1843, the area was part of Orange Township, among the first townships platted in Michigan and part of Macomb County. In 1843, Orange Township was renamed Erin Township, in homage to the numerous Irish immigrants who had moved into the area and had begun to exert their political influence. From 1843 until 1911, what is now St. Clair Shores was a part of Erin Township, parts of which make up today's municipalities of Eastpointe, Roseville, and St. Clair Shores.

In 1911, the eastern portion of Erin Township was partitioned off to become Lake Township. St. Clair Shores was incorporated as a village in 1925 and remained a part of Lake Township until, after numerous failed attempts, its residents voted to incorporate as the city of St. Clair Shores in January 1951. Lake Township continued adjacent to the city until 2009, when residents of the village of Grosse Pointe Shores (that portion of Grosse Pointe Shores in Macomb County located within Lake Township) voted to incorporate as a city.

Beginning around the time of the First World War, St. Clair Shores became a favored playground for gamblers, rum runners, and lakefront tourists alike, culminating during Prohibition, but continuing through the Second World War era. During these years, the village was the home to many popular roadhouses, blind pigs, and gambling establishments, such as the Blossom Heath Inn. St. Clair Shores' lakefront location and proximity to Canada coupled with a receptive and often participative community made it an advantageous haven for rum runners, and the area was actively involved in the rum-running era of Prohibition. Local residents, politicians, and law enforcement of the era were known to sometimes conflict with both state and federal officials over their attempts to regulate these illegal, but economically vital, activities within the community.

The Eagle Pointe subdivision, one of many platted within the village of St. Clair Shores during the early 20th century, was platted along a part of the lake shore in 1916. During the next few decades, dozens of subdivisions were platted through the local farmland, but most were not developed in earnest until after the Second World War, when St. Clair Shores became the fastest-growing suburb of Detroit during the 1950s.

From 1927 until 1959, the community was the location of the Jefferson Beach Amusement Park, a major lakefront attraction for the Detroit area and beyond. Opened in 1927, it boasted the longest roller coaster in the United States and numerous other midway attractions, a large, ornate lakefront dance pavilion, and a large, sandy beach popular with swimmers and sun bathers. In 1955, a fire destroyed some of the attractions and buildings within the once-popular park, and this, coupled with changing public tastes, accelerated its demise. While the owners of Jefferson Beach Amusement Park considered rebuilding, by this time the park was not popular with local government officials, and the city council had begun exploring forcing the closure of the facility or purchasing it for public use. Instead, the park owners, who had previously started building an onsite marina facility, began to expand that part of the facility. By 1959, the remaining park amusements and buildings were demolished to make room for the greatly enlarged Jefferson Beach Marina. All that remained of the once grand amusement park was its large, ornate lakefront dance coliseum, which for years thereafter was relegated to use as a marina storage facility and marine supply store until it, too, was destroyed by fire.

== Geography ==
St. Clair Shores is in southern Macomb County, on the western side of Lake St. Clair. It is bordered to the west by the cities of Roseville and Eastpointe and to the south, in Wayne County, by Harper Woods, Grosse Pointe Woods, and Grosse Pointe Shores. Interstate 94 runs along the western edge of the city, with access from Exits 224 through 230. I-94 leads southwest 13 miles (21 km) to midtown Detroit and northeast 40 miles (64 km) to Port Huron.

According to the U.S. Census Bureau, St. Clair Shores has a total area of 14.40 square miles (37.30 km^{2}), of which 2.72 square miles (7.04 km^{2}), or 18.9%, are covered by water. The city has 14 miles (23 km) of canals. Most of these canals are found in the Nautical Mile, which is along Jefferson between 9 Mile and 10 Mile Roads.

St Clair shores is connected to the communities nearby using the SMART bus services, connecting St Clair shores to the nearby communities like Warren or downtown Detroit by using the SMART bus services which also work with the Detroit Department of transportation (DDOT) bus services in the city of Detroit and Highland Park

St Clair shores is connected to nearby communities by two freeways, interstate i-696 connects St Clair shores to the rest of Macomb county's Southern half and the western suburbs of Oakland County, St Clair shores also connects with I-94 bringing you to downtown Detroit or the Detroit metropolitan airport or take the freeway North to Port Huron or Canada.

== Attractions ==
The Nautical Mile, a mile-long, lakefront strip of Jefferson Avenue between 9 Mile Road and 10 Mile Road, features a nautical-themed streetscape, retail establishments, restaurants, boat dealers, and both private and civic marinas. This business district is dominated by the tallest structure in St. Clair Shores, the 28-story Shore Club Sky Tower, colloquially known as "9 Mile Tower", and located at the foot of Nine Mile Road and Jefferson Avenue on the lakefront. The residential tower has become a prominent nautical landmark, and its rooftop beacon can be seen for many miles.

St. Clair Shores is home to the longest-consecutively running preliminary program pageant of the Miss America Organization in Michigan and among the longest-running in the United States. Since 1953, the Miss St. Clair Shores Scholarship Program has offered scholarships to young women in the community ages 17–24. The pageant is held each July at the local South Lake High School Auditorium. Miss St. Clair Shores volunteers and serves her city during her preparation to compete at the Miss Michigan Pageant.

Dating back to its years as a popular lakefront entertainment destination, St. Clair Shores has a long connection to Detroit's musical history. In addition to the many past roadhouses that featured numerous national performing artists of the era, other notable music-related locations include the former Car City Records store, whose employees have included many from the Detroit music scene; the former Crows Nest East, a short-lived, but popular music venue of the late 1960s; and the former Shirley's Swinger Lounge. Individuals and groups who played at or frequented these venues went on to regional and national success, including Bob Seger, the MC5, Iggy Pop, and The Frost.

St. Clair Shores, one of a few communities to lay claim to the "Hockeytown USA" moniker before the Detroit Red Wings and the city of Detroit, is known in the US and Canada as a youth hockey center, related to its St. Clair Shores Hockey Association. Once the home to the United States' first privately owned indoor ice hockey arena, Gordie Howe Hockeyland, St. Clair Shores also has two municipal indoor ice arenas at its civic recreation center. Owing to its youth hockey association, local high school hockey was prominent in the 1970s, with all three local high schools participating. St. Clair Shores Lakeview High School went undefeated during its 1973 state high-school championship season. Although the Gordie Howe Hockeyland has since closed, youth hockey is still popular in St. Clair Shores and vintage references to "Hockeytown USA" can still be found inside the St. Clair Shores Civic Arena.

Although its population has dropped from its peak in the early 1970s due to end of the baby boomer era and continued urban sprawl, St. Clair Shores continues to be a popular suburb of Detroit, owing largely to its advantageous lakefront location, its municipal park system, its fine recreational sports programs and facilities, and its three public school districts.

== Demographics ==
Historical population
Census	Pop.	Note	%±
1930	6,745		—
1940	10,405		54.3%
1950	19,823		90.5%
1960	76,657		286.7%
1970	88,093		14.9%
1980	76,210		−13.5%
1990	68,107		−10.6%
2000	63,096		−7.4%
2010	59,715		−5.4%
2020	58,874		−1.4%
U.S. Decennial Census; 2018 Estimate

=== 2020 census ===
As of the 2020 census, St. Clair Shores had a population of 58,874. The median age was 44.8 years. 16.7% of residents were under the age of 18 and 21.0% of residents were 65 years of age or older. For every 100 females there were 93.9 males, and for every 100 females age 18 and over there were 92.0 males age 18 and over.

100.0% of residents lived in urban areas, while 0.0% lived in rural areas.

There were 27,264 households in St. Clair Shores, of which 21.2% had children under the age of 18 living in them. Of all households, 40.0% were married-couple households, 21.5% were households with a male householder and no spouse or partner present, and 31.1% were households with a female householder and no spouse or partner present. About 36.9% of all households were made up of individuals and 16.7% had someone living alone who was 65 years of age or older.

There were 28,507 housing units, of which 4.4% were vacant. The homeowner vacancy rate was 1.5% and the rental vacancy rate was 4.8%.

Racial composition as of the 2020 census
Race	Number	Percent
White	50,644	86.0%
Black or African American	3,773	6.4%
American Indian and Alaska Native	134	0.2%
Asian	634	1.1%
Native Hawaiian and Other Pacific Islander	15	0.0%
Some other race	427	0.7%
Two or more races	3,247	5.5%
Hispanic or Latino (of any race)	1,651	2.8%

=== 2010 census ===
As of the census of 2010, there were 59,715 people, 26,585 households, and 15,932 families living in the city. The population density was 5,139.0 inhabitants per square mile (1,984.2/km^{2}). There were 28,467 housing units at an average density of 2,449.8 per square mile (945.9/km^{2}). The racial makeup of the city was 92.7% White, 3.9% African American, 0.3% Native American, 1.0% Asian, 0.2% from other races, and 1.7% from two or more races. Hispanic or Latino residents of any race were 1.7% of the population.

Of the 26,585 households, 24.6% had children under 18 living with them, 43.6% were married couples living together, 11.9% had a female householder with no husband present, 4.4% had a male householder with no wife present, and 40.1% were not families. About 35.1% of all households were made up of individuals, and 15.5% had someone living alone who was 65 or older. The average household size was 2.24, and the average family size was 2.90.

The median age in the city was 44.2 years; 19% of residents were under 18; 7% were between18 and 24; 24.9% were from 25 to 44; 29.7% were from 45 to 64; and 19.2% were 65 or older. The gender makeup of the city was 47.8% male and 52.2% female.

=== 2000 census ===
As of the census of 2000, 63,096 people, 27,434 households, and 17,283 families were living in the city. The population density was 5,472.3 inhabitants per square mile (2,112.9/km^{2}). The 28,208 housing units had an average density of 2,446.5 per square mile (944.6/km^{2}). The racial makeup of the city was 96.89% White, 0.69% African American, 0.28% Native American, 0.84% Asian, 0.20% from other races, and 1.10% from two or more races. Hispanic or Latino residents of any race were 1.18% of the population.

Of the 27,434 households, 24.1% had children under 18 living with them, 49.5% were married couples living together, 10.0% had a female householder with no husband present, and 37.0% were not families. About 32.7% of all households were made up of individuals, and 16.3% had someone living alone who was 65 years of age or older. The average household size was 2.28 and the average family size was 2.92.

In the city, the age distribution was 20.2% under 18, 6.2% from 18 to 24, 28.8% from 25 to 44, 23.1% from 45 to 64, and 21.8% who were 65 or older. The median age was 42 years. For every 100 females, there were 90.9 males. For every 100 females 18 and over, there were 86.8 males.

The median income for a household in the city was $49,047, and for a family was $59,245. Males had a median income of $46,614 versus $31,192 for females. The per capita income for the city was $25,009. About 2.6% of families and 3.7% of the population were below the poverty line, including 4.4% of those under 18 and 4.9% of those 65 or over.

== Education ==
St. Clair Shores has three school districts: South Lake Schools, which serves the southern portion of the city, Lakeview Public Schools, which serves the central portion of the city, and Lake Shore Public Schools, which serves the northern portion of the city. Each district operates one high school within the city.

Private, parochial schools include St. Germaine (Permanently Closed in 2024), St. Isaac Jogues, and St. Joan of Arc.

== Notable people ==
- George Allen – football coach in the National Football League and United States Football League; member of the Pro Football Hall of Fame
- Hunter Brown – Major League Baseball (MLB) pitcher for the Houston Astros (2022–present)
- Dave Coulier – actor and comedian
- David Coulter – politician; Oakland County executive
- David Debol – member of the National Hockey League (NHL) Hartford Whalers, (1979–81)
- Vinnie Dombroski – lead vocalist of the band Sponge
- Anne Fletcher – dancer, choreographer, and film director
- Faye Grant – actress
- Donald Patrick Harvey – actor (Die Hard 2, Walker, Texas Ranger)
- Alto Reed – musician, saxophonist, and backing vocalist most notably as a member of The Silver Bullet Band
- Fred "Sonic" Smith – guitarist, member of the bands MC5 and Sonic's Rendezvous Band
- Werner Spitz – forensic pathologist
- Mark Wells – member of the 1980 United States Olympic ice hockey team (Miracle on Ice)
- Rachelle Consiglio-Wilkos – television producer and wife of television personality Steve Wilkos
- Thomas J. Wilson – chairman and CEO of Allstate
- John Ziegler Jr. (1952) – president of the NHL (1977–1992) and member of the Hockey Hall of Fame (1987)

== See also ==
- Grosse Pointe
