= Madison District Public Schools =

School district in Michigan, USA

Address
- 26550 John R Rd. Madison Heights, Oakland, Michigan, 48071; United States

District information
- Type: Public school district
- Grades: Prekindergarten-12
- Superintendent: Patricia Perry
- Schools: 5
- Budget: $24,756,000 2022-2023 expenditures
- NCES District ID: 2622290

Students and staff
- Students: 947 (2024-2025)
- Teachers: 62.52 FTE (2024-2025)
- Staff: 153.73 (2024-2025) (FTE)
- Student–teacher ratio: 15.15 (2024-2025)

Other information
- Website: madisondistrict.org

Madison District Public Schools is a public school district in Metro Detroit in the U.S. state of Michigan, serving a portion of Madison Heights. The district is the smallest in Oakland County by enrollment, with 894 students in the 2023-2024 school year.

== History ==
Prior to 1913, children within the current district's boundaries attended school in Royal Oak. That year, residents successfully circulated a petition to establish a district of their own. Royal Oak Township District No. 10 opened its schoolhouse on October 1, 1913 with 25 students. The wooden school burned in 1914 and was replaced.

The district's population had increased such that by 1923, Oakland Elementary (now part of Royal Oak Schools was built. That year, the district changed its name from Greenwood to Madison in honor of President James Madison. The district had six teachers and 180 students.

Edison Elementary was built in 1925 and open by fall 1926. Ninth grade was added to the district in fall 1925, and the other high school grades were added in subsequent years. The site of Wilkinson Middle School originally held the former high school, which was built in 1924. Vandenberg Elementary (later called Shoenhals Elementary) was built in 1926 at 27107 Hales Street. The current high school was built in 1960.

As of the mid-1960s, the district had five elementary schools in addition the high school and junior high school: Edison, Roosevelt, and Vandenberg (all opened in 1926), Monroe (1950), and Halfman (1962).

Voters passed an $11.4 million bond issue in 2013 and Shoenhals Elementary was renovated and expanded, changing its name to Madison Elementary and becoming the district's only elementary school. In fall 2015, Edison Elementary (27321 Hampden) became Keys Grace Academy, a charter school authorized by Madison District Public Schools and geared toward Chaldean students.

== Schools ==
School	Address	Notes
Madison Early Childhood Center	25601 Couzens	preschool, formerly Halfman Elementary, built 1958
Madison Elementary School	27107 Hales St	Grades PreK-5, formerly Shoenhals Elementary
Madison High School	915 E 11 Mile Rd.	Grades 9-12, built 1960
Madison Preparatory School	915 E 11 Mile Rd.	Grades 9-12
Wilkinson Middle School	26524 John R Rd.	Grades 6-8

=== Former schools ===
- Edison Elementary School (formerly Blanche Villa School. Became KEYS Grace Academy charter school)
- Halfman Elementary School (became Madison Early Childhood Center)
- Monroe School (25421 Alger St.), demolished
- Roosevelt School (26060 Wolverine St.), demolished
- Shoenhals Elementary School (became Madison Elementary)
- Vandenberg (at 11 Mile and Hales)
