= Clawson Public Schools =

School district in Michigan

Address
- 626 Phillips Ave. Clawson, Oakland, Michigan, 48017; United States

District information
- Type: Public school district
- Grades: Prekindergarten-12
- Superintendent: Billy Shellenbarger
- Schools: 4
- Budget: $43,244,000 2022-2023 expenditures
- NCES District ID: 2609930

Students and staff
- Students: 1,214 (2024-2025)
- Teachers: 81.65 FTE (2024-2025)
- Staff: 214.6 (FTE) (2024-2025)
- Student–teacher ratio: 14.87 (2024-2025)

Other information
- Website: www.clawsonschools.org

Clawson Public Schools is a public school district in Metro Detroit in the U.S. state of Michigan, serving the city of Clawson. (Note: The district also includes a small portion of Royal Oak which is completely industrialized and has no residential areas.) Covering 2.21 square miles (5.7 km^{2}), Clawson Public Schools is the seventh-smallest school district in Michigan by land area.

== Schools ==
| School | Address | Grades | Notes |
|---|---|---|---|
| Clawson High School | 101 John M Ave. | 9-12 | Opened fall 1954, architect Lowell M. Price |
| Clawson Middle School | 150 John M Ave. | 6-8 | Middle school wing built in 2023. |
| Clawson Elementary School | 101 Phillips Ave. | PreK-5 | Built in 1924 as Clawson High School, used as Clawson Middle School prior to 2023. |
| Clawson Preschool | 313 Redruth Ave. | Pre-K | Previously housed in Clawson Elementary School. |
| Clawson Early Childhood Center | 313 Redruth Ave. | | Closed in June 2024 as Kenwood Elementary and opened as an Early Childhood Center in September 2025. |

Previously, Schalm Elementary served children through fifth grade living north of 14 Mile Road and/or west of Rochester. Kenwood served those south of 14 Mile and/or east of Rochester. There was a bus service for any child who had to cross more than one of those roads. The middle school and high school do not have any busing. Clawson Preschool was also the special education center known as the Baker Administration Building.

== Filming location ==
In 2013, Clawson High School was used as a filming location for It Follows.
