= Port Huron High School =

Location
- 2215 Court St; Port Huron, Michigan 48060

Information
- Type: Public Coeducational
- Motto: Once a Big Red, Always a Big Red
- Established: 1868; 158 years ago
- Superintendent: Theo Kerhoulas
- Principal: Michael Palmer
- Staff: 56.78 (FTE)
- Enrollment: 1,058 (2023-2024)
- Student to teacher ratio: 18.63
- Colors: Red and white
- Athletics conference: Macomb Area Conference (MAC)
- Mascot: Redhawk
- Nickname: Redhawks
- Accreditation: North Central, & U of Michigan
- Affiliations: Port Huron Schools
- Website: www.phasd.us/o/phhs

Michigan State Historic Site
- Designated: December 15, 1988

Port Huron High School (PHHS) was founded in 1868, and has been in continuous operation as a secondary school in Port Huron, Michigan since then.

Port Huron High School was originally located at what is now the site of St. Clair Community College. The original building was built in 1870, then rebuilt in 1874 and 1908 after it was twice destroyed in fires. In 1957, the high school moved to its current location and building.

In 2024, the U.S. News & World Report ranked Port Huron High School as between 480th and 673rd in the state. PHHS athletic teams competed in the Eastern Michigan League (EML) until the 1990s; upon dissolution of the EML, PHHS joined the Macomb Area Conference (MAC). The athletic teams are known as the "Red Hawks", a reference to the school colors—red, white and black. The name was changed in Spring, 2023.

== Alumni ==
- Steve Bannatyne - film producer
- Chad Nicefield - lead singer of the band Wilson
- Mark Chapman- 2012 Michigan HS Gatorade Player of the Year! Practice Squad for the New York Giants and Denver Broncos, #1 Pick in the CFL draft
- Josh Withenshaw- Guitarist for the band Dangerous Summer! Former Guitarist for the band Every Avenue!
