= List of Chicago Bears award winners =

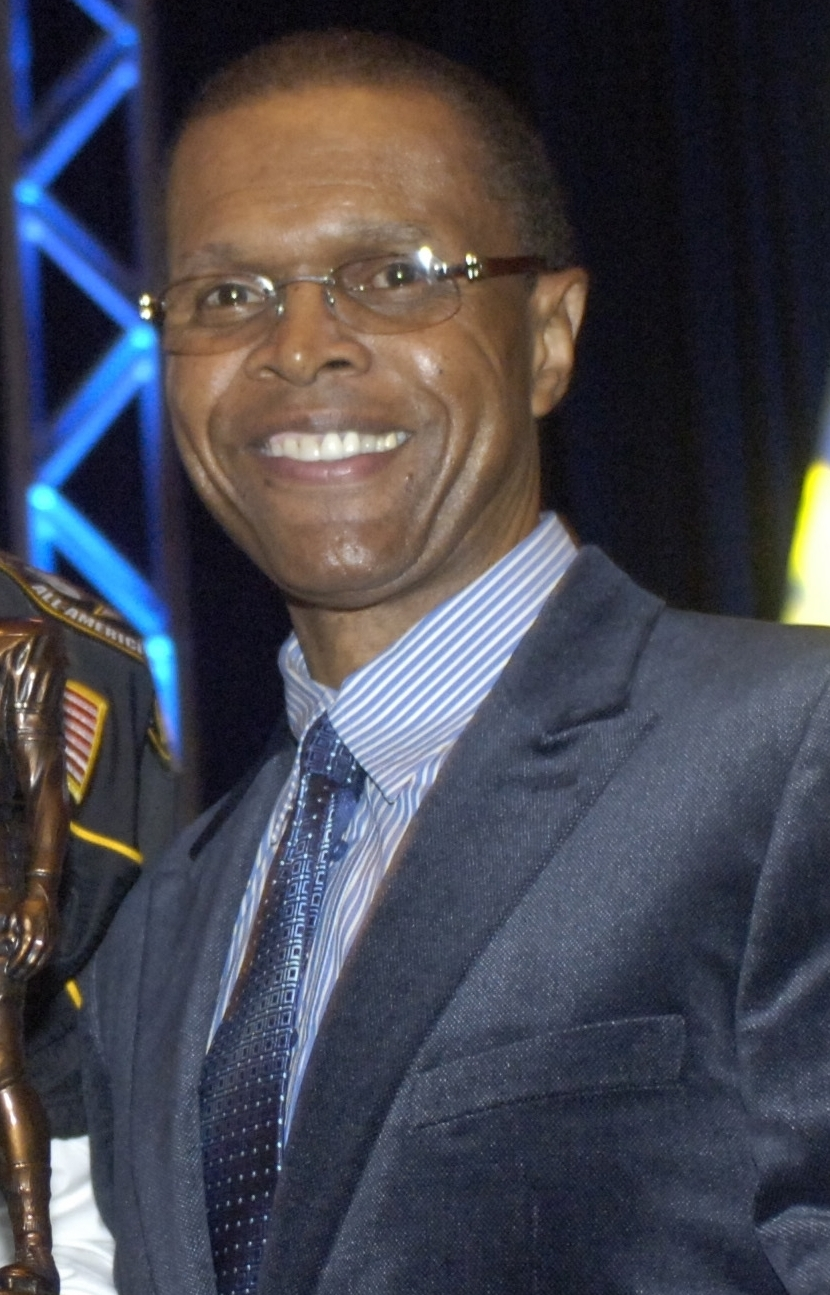
Running back Gale Sayers was named the UPI NFL Rookie of the Year in 1965.

The Chicago Bears are an American football franchise currently playing in the National Football League. The following is a list of all the awards the franchise has acquired over since its inception in 1920.

== Individual league awards ==
Most Valuable Player
#	Player	Season	Awarding Organization	Ref
1	Sid Luckman	1943	Joe F. Carr Trophy	
2	Harlon Hill	1955	NEA	
3	Walter Payton(1)	1977	PFWA, AP, FD	
--	Walter Payton(2)	1985	NEA	

Super Bowl MVP
#	Player	Season	Awarding Organization	Ref
1	Richard Dent	1985 (XX)	NFL	

Offensive Player of the Year
#	Player	Season	Awarding Organization	Ref
1	Walter Payton	1977	AP	

Defensive Player of the Year
#	Player	Season	Awarding Organization	Ref
1	Dick Butkus(1)	1969	NEA	
--	Dick Butkus(2)	1970	NEA	
2	Mike Singletary(1)	1985	AP	
--	Mike Singletary(2)	1988	AP, NEA	
3	Brian Urlacher	2001	FD	
--	Brian Urlacher	2005	AP	

Offensive Rookie of the Year
#	Player	Season	Awarding Organization	Ref
1	Mike Ditka	1961	UPI	
2	Ronnie Bull	1962	UPI	
3	Gale Sayers	1965	UPI, NEA	
4	Jim McMahon	1982	UPI	
5	Rashaan Salaam	1995	UPI	
6	Anthony Thomas	2001	AP	

Defensive Rookie of the Year
#	Player	Season	Awarding Organization	Ref
1	J. C. Caroline	1956	SN	
2	Wally Chambers	1973	AP, FD	
3	Mark Carrier	1990	UPI, AP, FD	
4	Brian Urlacher	2000	AP, FD	
5	Charles Tillman	2003	FD	

Coach of the Year
#	Coach	Season	Awarding Organization	Ref
1	George Halas(1)	1963	UPI, SN, AP	
--	George Halas(2)	1965	UPI, SN, AP	
2	Jack Pardee	1976	UPI	
3	Mike Ditka(1)	1985	UPI, SN, AP, FD	
--	Mike Ditka(2)	1988	UPI, PFW, AP, FD	
4	Dave Wannstedt	1994	UPI	
5	Dick Jauron	2001	SN, PFW, AP, MFC, FD	
6	Lovie Smith	2005	PFW, AP	
7	Matt Nagy	2019	NFL	

Bert Bell Award
#	Player	Season	Awarding Organization	Ref
1	Walter Payton	1985	MFC	

Man of the Year Award
#	Player	Season	Awarding Organization	Ref
1	Walter Payton	1977	NFL	
2	Dave Duerson	1987	NFL	
3	Mike Singletary	1990	NFL	
4	Jim Flanigan	2000	NFL	
5	Charles Tillman	2013	NFL	

NFC Player of the Year
#	Player	Season	Awarding Organization	Ref
1	Wally Chambers	1976 (Defense)	UPI	
2	Walter Payton(1)	1977 (Offense)	UPI	
3	Mike Singletary(1)	1984 (Defense)	UPI	
--	Walter Payton(2)	1985 (Offense)	UPI	
--	Mike Singletary(2)	1985 (Defense)	UPI	
--	Mike Singletary(3)	1988 (Defense)	UPI	

NFC Rookie of the Year
#	Player	Season	Awarding Organization	Ref
1	Jim McMahon	1982	UPI	
2	Mark Carrier	1990	UPI	
3	Rashaan Salaam	1995	UPI	
