= Steven Oleksy =

American ice hockey player (born 1986)

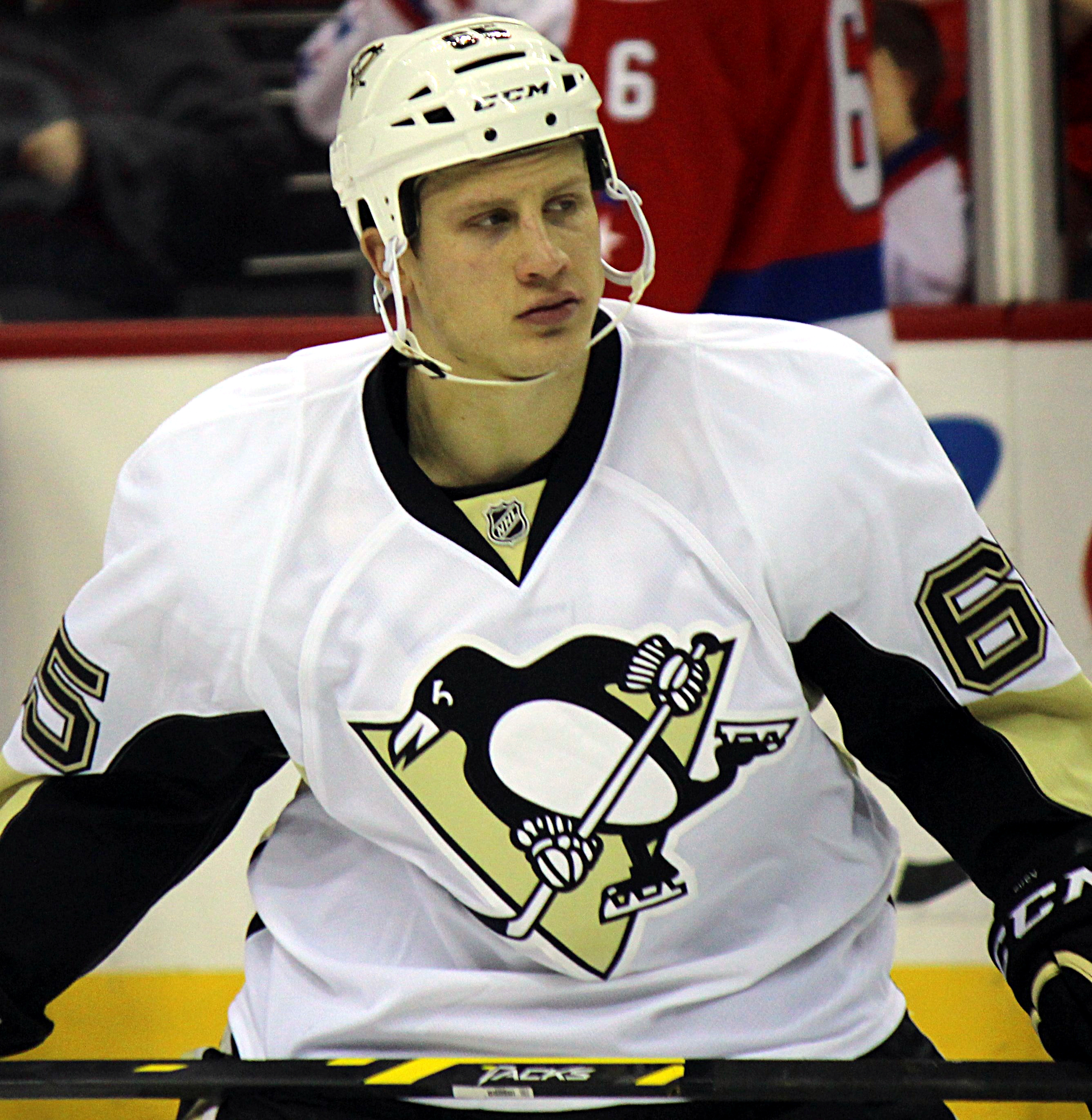
- Oleksy with the Pittsburgh Penguins during an away game against the Washington Capitals, March 2016
- Born: February 4, 1986 (age 40) Chesterfield, Michigan, U.S.
- Height: 6 ft 0 in (183 cm)
- Weight: 194 lb (88 kg; 13 st 12 lb)
- Position: Defense
- Shoots: Right
- ECHL team Former teams: Jacksonville Icemen; Las Vegas Wranglers; Toledo Walleye; Port Huron Icehawks; Idaho Steelheads; Lake Erie Monsters; Bridgeport Sound Tigers; Hershey Bears; Washington Capitals; Pittsburgh Penguins; Toronto Marlies; San Diego Gulls; Black Wings Linz; Orlando Solar Bears
- NHL draft: Undrafted
- Playing career: 2009–present
- Spouse: Brooke Hogan (m. 2022)
- Children: 2

Steven Andrew Oleksy (born February 4, 1986) is an American professional ice hockey defenseman who currently plays for the Jacksonville Icemen of the ECHL. He played in the National Hockey League (NHL) with the Washington Capitals and Pittsburgh Penguins.

== Early life ==
Oleksy was born in Chesterfield, Michigan. He attended L'Anse Creuse High School - North in Macomb Township, Michigan and graduated in 2004. He has one brother, Daniel, who played hockey at Oakland University in Michigan. During high school, Oleksy was a four-year letter winner at L'Anse Creuse High School-North. He played one year of NJCAA college baseball at Macomb Community College in Warren, Michigan. His jersey number was retired at L'Anse Creuse High School - North on May 13, 2014.

== Playing career ==
Oleksy grew up playing hockey around the metro Detroit area. He played for the Troy Sting AA team, before moving on to play junior hockey in the Central States Hockey League with the Michigan Metro Jets. He then played in the NAHL with the Traverse City North Stars. Next, Oleksy earned a scholarship at Lake Superior State University in Sault Ste. Marie, Michigan where he played three seasons of NCAA Division I college hockey with the Lake Superior State Lakers men's ice hockey team. After graduating, he turned professional joining the Las Vegas Wranglers for two games at the end of their 2008–09 ECHL season.

After starting the 2011–12 season with the Idaho Steelheads of the ECHL for a third season, Oleksy joined the Bridgeport Sound Tigers on loan before signing an extension for the remainder of the year on February 23, 2012.

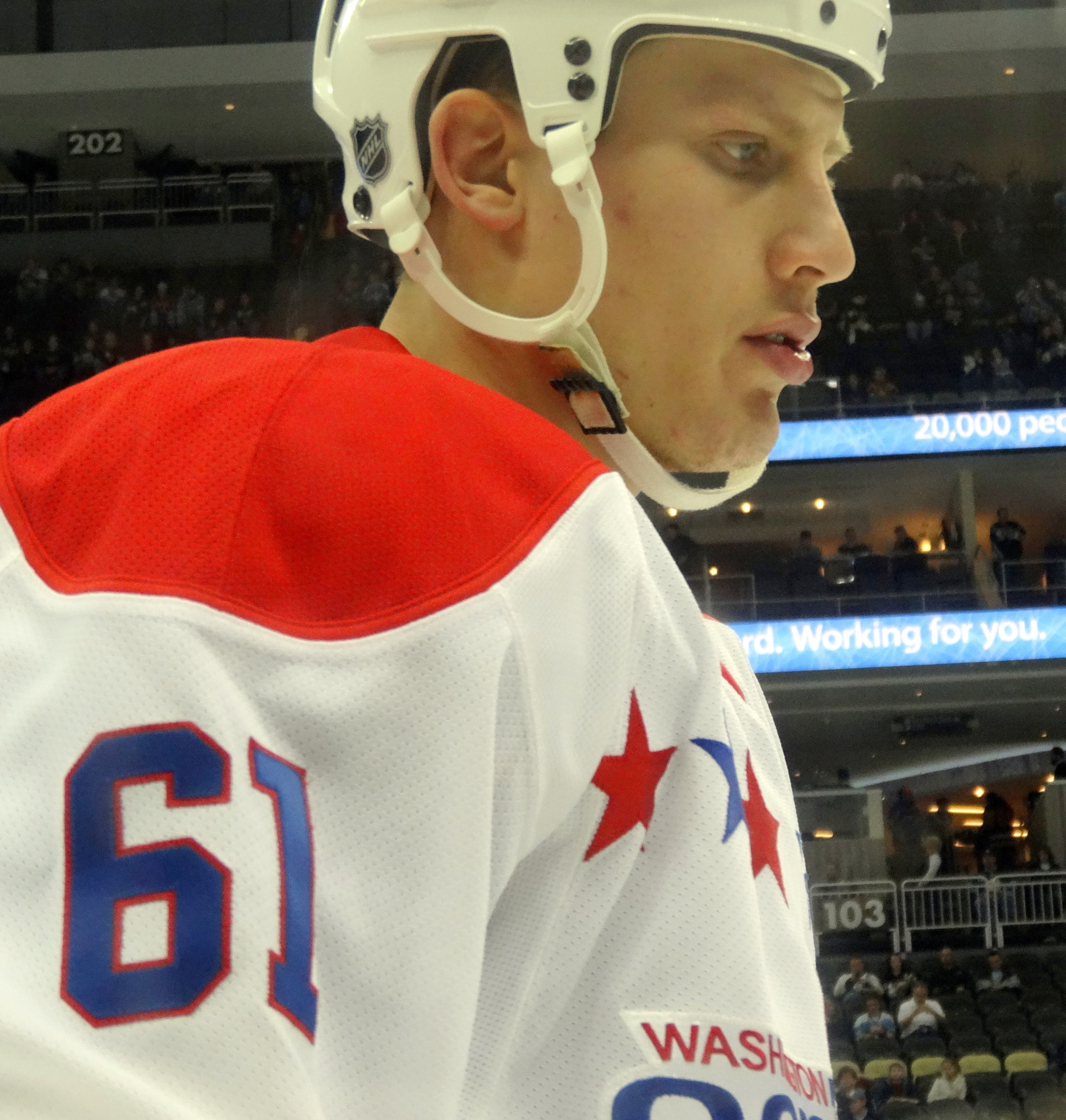
Oleksy with the Capitals at an away game against the Pittsburgh Penguins in March 2013

Proving a solid addition to the Sound Tigers' defense, Oleksy was signed as a free agent for the following 2012–13 season in the AHL with the Hershey Bears on July 2, 2012. After 55 games with the Bears and ranking third among AHL defensemen in penalty minutes, Oleksy was signed to his first NHL deal with the Bears' affiliate, the Washington Capitals, on a three-year two-way contract on March 4, 2013. He was then immediately recalled to the Capitals. In his NHL debut, he registered an assist for the Capitals in a 4–3 comeback victory over the Boston Bruins on March 5.

On July 1, 2015, Oleksy left the Capitals as a free agent and signed a one-year, two-way contract with the Pittsburgh Penguins. On June 12, 2016, he won the Stanley Cup as a member of the Penguins. After the game he drank his first ever sip of alcohol out of the cup. During the 2016–17 season, he started a second season in Scranton before he returned to NHL action, appearing in 11 games with Pittsburgh for 1 assist. On March 1, 2017, Oleksy was included in a trade by the Penguins, alongside Eric Fehr and a fourth-round pick in 2017, to the Toronto Maple Leafs in exchange for Frank Corrado. He was directly assigned to their AHL affiliate, the Toronto Marlies.

On July 2, 2017, Oleksy secured a two-year, one-way contract as a free agent with the Anaheim Ducks. During the second year of his contract in the 2018–19 season, while with the Ducks AHL affiliate, the San Diego Gulls, he was traded for a second time to the Toronto Maple Leafs in exchange for Adam Cracknell on December 10, 2018. He appeared in a further 23 regular season games with the Marlies, posting 2 goals and 5 points.

After his NHL contract expired, Oleksy went unsigned over the summer. On September 27, 2019, he agreed to return to his former AHL club, the Wilkes-Barre/Scranton Penguins, signing an initial professional tryout contract to begin the 2019–20 season. Oleksy was released from his tryout before appearing in a game with the Penguins and was signed to an ECHL contract with the Toledo Walleye on October 15, 2019. He made 36 appearances in his return with the Walleye before leaving North America to sign a contract in Europe for the remainder of the season with Austrian club, EHC Black Wings Linz of the EBEL, on February 7, 2020.

In November 2021, he signed with the Toledo Walleye of the ECHL before being traded to the Orlando Solar Bears in January 2022.

Oleksy re-signed with the Solar Bears for the 2022-23 season, but only appeared in four games between November 4 and November 11, 2022.

On December 5, 2025, Oleksy returned to professional hockey, joining the Jacksonville Icemen of the ECHL for a pair of weekend home games.

== Personal life ==
Olesky has been married to singer and businesswoman Brooke Hogan, daughter of Hulk Hogan and Linda Hogan, since June 8, 2022. The couple have fraternal twins, born January 15, 2025. He was known as "Binky" to his teammates, a childhood nickname from him needing a pacifier while sick in the hospital.

As of July 2026, Olesky is running for mayor in Edgewater, Volusia County, Florida.

== Career statistics ==
			Regular season					Playoffs
Season	Team	League	GP	G	A	Pts	PIM	GP	G	A	Pts	PIM
2005–06	Traverse City North Stars	NAHL	57	11	19	30	140	5	0	1	1	2
2006–07	Lake Superior State U.	CCHA	39	2	2	4	24	—	—	—	—	—
2007–08	Lake Superior State U.	CCHA	36	1	6	7	36	—	—	—	—	—
2008–09	Lake Superior State U.	CCHA	38	0	9	9	50	—	—	—	—	—
2008–09	Las Vegas Wranglers	ECHL	2	0	0	0	0	—	—	—	—	—
2009–10	Toledo Walleye	ECHL	3	0	0	0	2	—	—	—	—	—
2009–10	Port Huron Icehawks	IHL	28	1	1	2	35	—	—	—	—	—
2009–10	Idaho Steelheads	ECHL	33	1	8	9	72	8	0	0	0	25
2010–11	Idaho Steelheads	ECHL	55	7	14	21	134	—	—	—	—	—
2010–11	Lake Erie Monsters	AHL	17	0	4	4	39	3	0	1	1	2
2011–12	Idaho Steelheads	ECHL	14	1	7	8	47	—	—	—	—	—
2011–12	Bridgeport Sound Tigers	AHL	50	1	14	15	98	3	0	0	0	2
2012–13	Hershey Bears	AHL	55	2	12	14	151	—	—	—	—	—
2012–13	Washington Capitals	NHL	28	1	8	9	33	7	0	1	1	4
2013–14	Washington Capitals	NHL	33	2	8	10	53	—	—	—	—	—
2013–14	Hershey Bears	AHL	30	0	6	6	39	—	—	—	—	—
2014–15	Hershey Bears	AHL	68	4	11	15	147	8	0	3	3	8
2014–15	Washington Capitals	NHL	1	0	0	0	0	—	—	—	—	—
2015–16	Wilkes-Barre/Scranton Penguins	AHL	63	2	17	19	123	9	0	1	1	38
2016–17	Wilkes-Barre/Scranton Penguins	AHL	16	1	4	5	16	—	—	—	—	—
2016–17	Pittsburgh Penguins	NHL	11	0	1	1	24	—	—	—	—	—
2016–17	Toronto Marlies	AHL	20	3	6	9	39	11	1	2	3	14
2017–18	San Diego Gulls	AHL	54	7	13	20	66	—	—	—	—	—
2018–19	San Diego Gulls	AHL	15	0	2	2	36	—	—	—	—	—
2018–19	Toronto Marlies	AHL	23	2	3	5	30	2	0	0	0	5
2019–20	Toledo Walleye	ECHL	36	1	14	15	62	—	—	—	—	—
2019–20	EHC Black Wings Linz	EBEL	8	1	0	1	4	3	1	2	3	6
2021–22	Toledo Walleye	ECHL	16	2	6	8	19	—	—	—	—	—
2021–22	Orlando Solar Bears	ECHL	28	1	6	7	44	—	—	—	—	—
2022–23	Orlando Solar Bears	ECHL	4	2	1	3	0	—	—	—	—	—
NHL totals			73	3	17	20	110	7	0	1	1	4

== InLine Hockey ==
Oleksy played with Team USA at the 2008 and 2009 IIHF Men's InLine Hockey World Championships.
