= Fox Elementary School =

Fox Elementary School may refer to:

- Fox Elementary School, Columbus, Georgia - Muscogee County School District
- Fox Elementary School, Macomb, Michigan (Detroit area) - Chippewa Valley Schools
- Fox Elementary School, Harris County, Texas (Klein address, Houston area) - Klein Independent School District
- William Fox Elementary School, Richmond, Virginia - Richmond Public Schools
