= Clinton-Macomb Public Library =

Library in Michigan, United States

Coordinates: 42.598895°N 82.930255°W

Clinton Macomb Public Library
- Location: 40900 Romeo Plank Road, Clinton Township, Macomb County, Michigan, United States, 48038
- Established: 1992; 34 years ago
- Branches: 3

Other information
- Director: Larry Neal
- Website: cmpl.org }}

The Clinton-Macomb Public Library (CMPL) is a district library headquartered in Clinton Charter Township, Michigan, United States.

Formed in 1992, Clinton-Macomb Public Library has three facilities - the Main Library in Clinton Township, North Branch in Macomb Township, and the South Branch in Clinton Township. The Library has a board of eight trustees appointed by Clinton and Macomb Township officials. Funding comes from property taxes and operates as a non-profit status as a Michigan Municipal Corporation.

The Library was founded on March 16, 1992, and began operations on May 1, 1992, under State Public Act 24 of 1989 which created the initial district library agreement. The addition of certified staff and 66 open service hours qualified the Clinton-Macomb Public Library for public library certification by the State of Michigan. Once certified by the Library of Michigan, the CMPL began to receive state aid and was enabled to join the Suburban Library Cooperative.

It originally occupied space in the Community Education Wing of Seneca Middle School. In May 1997 the library board signed a lease for a 4,200-square-foot (390 m^{2}) storefront and the library moved from Seneca to the new location in the Campus Plaza Shopping Center.

In August 2000 the library opened its first branch. The 7,400-square-foot (690 m^{2}) South Branch is located in Clinton Township. The branch was designed to be a popular materials center catering to families in the immediate area. The South Branch moved to a new expanded 19,000-square-foot (1765 m^{2}) location in 2014.

The North Branch was opened in July 2001. Also designed to be a popular materials center, the North Branch is 14,000 square feet (1,300 m^{2}).

On October 26, 2003, the new Main Library opened in Macomb County. The 84,000-square-foot (7,800 m^{2}) building is the largest library in Macomb County.
