= Kyle Cook (American football) =

American football player (born 1983)

No. 64
- Position: Center

Personal information
- Born: July 25, 1983 (age 43); Mount Clemens, Michigan, U.S.
- Listed height: 6 ft 3 in (1.91 m)
- Listed weight: 315 lb (143 kg)

Career information
- High school: Macomb (MI) Dakota
- College: Michigan State
- NFL draft: 2007: undrafted

Career history
- Minnesota Vikings (2007)*; Cincinnati Bengals (2007–2013)
- * Offseason or practice squad member only

Awards and highlights
- Second-team All-Big Ten (2006)

Career NFL statistics
- Games played: 73
- Games started: 66
- Stats at Pro Football Reference

Kyle Cook (born July 25, 1983) is an American former professional football player who was a center in the National Football League (NFL). He played college football for the Michigan State Spartans. Cook was a member of the NFL's Minnesota Vikings and Cincinnati Bengals.

== Early life ==
Kyle Cook is the son of Thomas and Nancy Cook; he has a sister, Sarah. Cook played high school football at Dakota High School in Macomb, Michigan. He was a PrepStar All-American, ranked among the nation's top 60 offensive linemen by TheInsiders.com (No. 54) and named to SuperPrep's All-Midwest Team after being rated among the region's top 60 prospects (No. 55). He was listed among the state's top seniors by the Lansing State Journal (No. 14), The Detroit News (No. 20) and Detroit Free Press (No. 23) and named to the Detroit Free Press Dream Team and The Detroit News Class A All-State Team. Cook was selected to The Detroit News All-Metro Team and earned All-Metro East recognition from both The Detroit News and Detroit Free Press. He was a three-year starter for coach Mike Giannone at Dakota. Cook also lettered in basketball and track.

== College career ==
Cook played at Michigan State University from 2003 to 2006, following a redshirt year in 2002. He started 11 games as a junior for a Spartans club that set a school record for passing yards (295.5 yards per game). As a senior, he was named second-team All-Big Ten Conference, leading the team in pancake blocks (48) for the second straight year. He closed out his Spartans career with 35 consecutive starts, and played in the all-star Hula Bowl following the 2006 season

He majored in construction management at Michigan State. He was a member of the Sigma Alpha Epsilon fraternity.

== Professional career ==
Undrafted out of college, Cook signed with the Minnesota Vikings as free agent on May 4, 2007. He was waived by the Vikings on September 1, 2007, and four days later was signed to the Cincinnati Bengals practice squad. He was added to the Bengals roster on December 31, 2007.

In 2008, he saw his first NFL action, playing in Games 2–6 on special teams, but was placed on Reserve/Injured list Oct. 17 due to a dislocated toe suffered in a collision during pregame warmups Oct. 5 against the Dallas Cowboys.

In 2009, he earned the starting position in preseason, and was praised by coaches as the “glue” of a revamped unit as the Bengals captured the AFC North title. He helped the Bengals finish ninth in NFL rushing (128.5 yards per game), including a team record of eight games of 100 or more yards by individual backs. He aided in a 141-yard rushing game by Cedric Benson on September 20 at Green Bay. He helped lead fourth-quarter drives of 85 and 71 yards during a comeback win September 27 vs. the Pittsburgh Steelers. On October 11 at Baltimore, Cook and the rest of the offensive line helped Benson become the first player in 40 games to rush for 100 yards against the Ravens, and on October 25 Benson rushed for a career-high 189 yards vs. the Chicago Bears while aiding a sack-free performance up front.

In 2010, he contributed to the Bengals ranking second in the AFC and sixth in the NFL in fewest sacks allowed per passing play. The offensive line allowed no sacks for 100 straight passing plays to close the season, including the last three full games. Cook aided in an offensive output of 469 total yards October 24 at Atlanta (most by the Bengals since Game 2 of 2007).

He was released on March 11, 2014. He retired on August 21, 2014.
