= Dakota High School (Michigan) =

Location
- 21051 21 Mile Road; Macomb, Michigan 48044; United States; 42°38′41″N 82°54′35″W

Information
- School type: Public, magnet high school
- Established: 1995
- School district: Chippewa Valley Schools
- Principal: Kevin Koskos
- Teaching staff: 114.40 (on an FTE basis)
- Grades: 9-12
- Enrollment: 2,476 (2024-2025)
- Student to teacher ratio: 21.64
- Campus: Suburban
- Colors: Green, navy, gray
- Athletics conference: Macomb Area Conference
- Nickname: Cougars
- Rivals: Romeo, Chippewa Valley
- Accreditation: Cognia
- Feeder schools: Iroquois and Seneca Middle Schools
- Website: www.chippewavalleyschools.org/schools/high-schools/dhs/

Dakota High School is a public, magnet high school located in the Metropolitan Detroit region, situated in the suburb of Macomb Township, Michigan. Dakota serves grades 9-12 and is one of three high schools in the Chippewa Valley Schools.

== Academics ==
Student assessments
- 2021–22 school year Change vs. prior year

M-STEP 11th grade proficiency rates (Science / Social Studies)
- Advanced %: 12.7 / 9.1
- Proficient %: 23.8 / 28.7
- PR. Proficient %: 16.5 / 49.3
- Not Proficient %: 47.0 / 12.9

Average test scores
- SAT Total: 991.7 (▼ −20.8)

Dakota High School has been accredited by Cognia or its predecessors since April 1, 1996.

== Demographics ==
The demographic breakdown of the 2,996 students enrolled in 2017-18 was:

- Male - 50.6%
- Female -49.4%
- Native American/Alaskan Native - 0.1%
- Asian - 3.4%
- Black - 7.8%
- Hispanic - 3.0%
- Native Hawaiian/Pacific islanders - 0.2%
- Non-Hispanic White - 82.4%
- Multiracial - 3.1%

19.1% of the students were eligible for free or reduced-cost lunch.

== Athletics ==
The football team won state championships in 2006 and 2007.

== Notable alumni ==
- Kyle Cook - NFL football center
- Ryan Rollins - Shooting Guard for the Milwaukee Bucks
- Gabriel William Shunn - Award Winning California Craft Beer Brewer / Expert at Siebel Institute
- Natalie Viggiano - NWSL soccer midfielder
