= L'Anse Creuse High School - North =

Location
- 23700 21 Mile Rd; Macomb Township, Michigan 48042; United States; 42°38′23″N 82°52′12″W

Information
- School type: Public, magnet high school
- School district: L'Anse Creuse Public Schools
- Principal: Nicholas Ellul
- Teaching staff: 72.82 (on an FTE basis)
- Grades: 9-12
- Enrollment: 1,554 (2023-2024)
- Student to teacher ratio: 21.34
- Campus: Suburb, large
- Colors: Black & Vegas Gold
- Athletics conference: Macomb Area Conference
- Nickname: Crusaders
- Rival: L'Anse Creuse High School
- Website: www.lc-ps.org/schools/hs/lchs-north/

L'Anse Creuse High School - North, colloquially known as simply "L'Anse Creuse North", is a public, magnet high school in Macomb Township, Michigan, and serves grades 9-12. It is one of two high schools in the L'Anse Creuse Public Schools district, with the other being L'Anse Creuse High School. L'Anse Creuse High School - North was created in 1975, with along L'Anse Creuse Junior High - North.

== Demographics ==
The demographic breakdown of the 1,545 students enrolled in 2024–2025 was:

- Male - 49.3%
- Female - 50.7%
- Native American/Alaskan - 0.1%
- Asian/Pacific islanders - 1.7%
- Black - 11.1%
- Hispanic - 4.6%
- White - 76.2%
- Multiracial - 6.3%

27.7% of the students were eligible for free or reduced-cost lunch.

== Notable alumni ==
- Steven Oleksy, professional ice hockey defenseman
- Tyler Conklin, NFL football tight end
