= Carey Torrice =

American politician (born 1977)

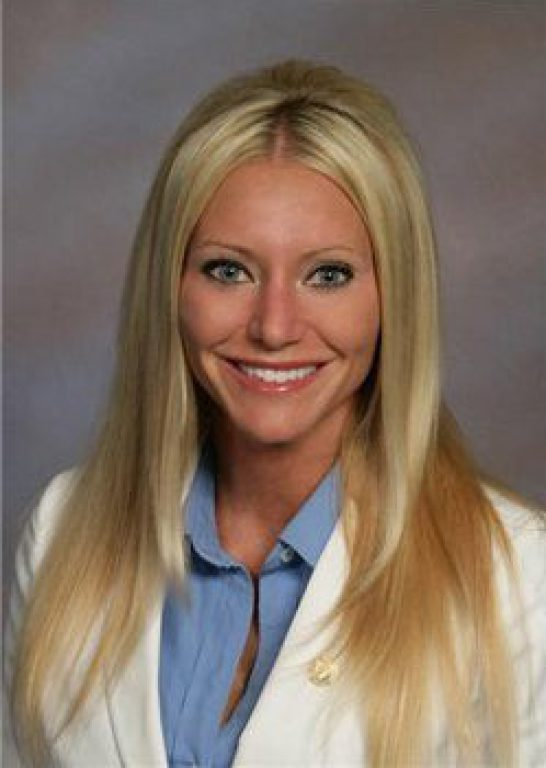

Member of the Macomb County Board of Commissioners
- In office 2006–2010

Personal details
- Born: Carey Shawn DeJaeghere; February 13, 1977 (age 49) Detroit, Michigan, U.S.
- Spouse: Mike
- Education: Chippewa Valley High School; Macomb Community College; Wayne State University (BA)
- Profession: Politician
- Website: careytorrice.eyespyinvestigations.com

Carey Torrice (born 13 February 1977 in Detroit, Michigan, as Carey Shawn DeJaeghere) is a politician from Macomb County, Michigan, who served on the Macomb County Board of Commissioners from 2006 to 2010. In 2007, she was named "Hottest Politician in the USA" by TMZ.com, and was also featured on Inside Edition as "America's Sexiest Politician" in 2008.

== Early life ==
Torrice was born in Detroit, Michigan, United States. She moved to Clinton Township at a young age. She graduated from Chippewa Valley High School, and obtained an associate degree from Macomb Community College and a BA from Wayne State University.

Her uncle, Leo Fenn, managed such rock bands as Suzi Quatro's The Pleasure Seekers, Alice Cooper, and The Billion Dollar Babies. Her Cousin, Sherilyn Fenn is an American actress best known for playing Audrey Horne in the television series Twin Peaks. Torrice's Great Uncle is Francis Henry “Father of the Jeep” Fenn

== Political career ==
Torrice was elected in 2006 to the Macomb County Board of Commissioners. She was re-elected to a second term in 2008. During her time in office, Torrice served as the Chairperson of the Public Services Committee and as Chairperson of the Veterans Services Committee. While on the commission she focused on securing medicine for animals at the Macomb County Animal Shelter and converting the shelter to a no-kill facility, according to her press release. She also worked to support passage of the Veterans Service millage, In honor of her late Father, USMC Sgt. Larry DeJaeghere.

== Personal life ==
Torrice has worked both as a licensed private investigator and as an actress. She has appeared on various television shows including E! Entertainment's Holly's World featuring Playmate Holly Madison. She currently co-owns Eye Spy Detective Agency along with her husband, Mike, in Fraser. Carey Torrice is widely discussed for her high IQ and is an official Mensa International member.

== Filmography ==
- Silent Scream (2005)
- "Gran Torino" (2008)
- Annabelle & Bear (2010)
- Tetherball (2010)
- Holly's World (2011)
- Maury Povich
- Lost River" (2014)
