= L'Anse Creuse Public Schools =

School district in Michigan

Address
- 24076 Frederick V. Pankow Blvd Clinton Township, Michigan, 48036; United States
- Coordinates: 42.62090°N 82.86406°W

District information
- Grades: PK-12
- Superintendent: Keith Howell
- Schools: 19
- Budget: US$156,059,000 expenditures (2022-2023)
- NCES District ID: 2621870

Students and staff
- Enrollment: 9,215 (2024-2025)
- Teachers: 555.25 (2024-2025) FTE
- Staff: 1,213.95 (2024-2025) FTE
- Student–teacher ratio: 16.6 (2024-2025)

Other information
- Website: www.lc-ps.org

L'Anse Creuse Public Schools is a school district located in Macomb County, Michigan in Metro Detroit. It serves parts of the townships of Chesterfield, Clinton, Harrison, and Macomb.

== History ==
In 1954, five small school districts consolidated to form L'Anse Creuse Public School District. The consolidation was motivated by Mount Clemens School District's decision to no longer accept high school students from outside of its district. The districts consolidated were Atwood, Green, Herman Klix, Jefferson and South River. The district was named for “Little Bay” or “Shallow Bay” in French.

== Schools ==
Schools in L'Anse Creuse Public Schools district
School	Address	Notes
Elementary Schools (Grades K-5)
Atwood	45690 North Avenue, Macomb	
Francis A. Higgins	29901 24 Mile Rd., Chesterfield Twp.	
Joseph M. Carkenord	27100 24 Mile Rd., Chesterfield Twp.	
Emma V. Lobbestael	38495 Prentiss St., Harrison Twp.	
Marie C. Graham	25555 Crocker Rd., Harrison Twp.	Also houses L'Anse Creuse Early Childhood Center.
Tenniswood	23450 Glenwood Ave., Clinton Twp.	
Green	47260 Sugarbush Rd., Chesterfield Twp.	Built 1929.
South River	27733 South River Rd, Harrison Twp.	
Donald J. Yacks	34700 Union Lake Rd., Harrison Twp.	
Middle Schools (Grades 6-8)
L'Anse Creuse Middle School Central	38000 Reimold, Harrison Twp.	
L'Anse Creuse Middle School East	30300 Hickey Rd., Chesterfield Twp.	
L'Anse Creuse Middle School North	46201 Fairchild, Macomb Twp.	
L'Anse Creuse Middle School South	34641 Jefferson Ave., Harrison Twp.	
High Schools (Grades 9-12)
L'Anse Creuse High School	38495 L'Anse Creuse Rd., Harrison Twp.	
L'Anse Creuse High School - North	23700 21 Mile Rd., Macomb Twp.	
Other Facilities
Anna Mae Burdi Early Childhood Center	29851 24 Mile Rd., Chesterfield Twp.	Preschool
Frederick V. Pankow Center	24600 F. V. Pankow Blvd., Clinton Twp.	Career/technical education center. Also houses Mathematics, Science, and Technology Program. Includes the John R. Armstrong Performing Arts Center.
Diane M. Pellerin Center	24001 F. V. Pankow Blvd., Macomb Twp.	Alternative high school
Harry L. Wheeler Community Center & Administrative Offices	24076 Frederick V. Pankow Blvd., Macomb Twp.	
