= Tyler Conklin =

American football player (born 1995)

No. 83 – Detroit Lions
- Position: Tight end
- Roster status: Active

Personal information
- Born: July 30, 1995 (age 31); Chesterfield, Michigan, U.S.
- Listed height: 6 ft 3 in (1.91 m)
- Listed weight: 248 lb (112 kg)

Career information
- High school: L'Anse Creuse North (Macomb Township, Michigan)
- College: Northwood (2013); Central Michigan (2014–2017)
- NFL draft: 2018: 5th round, 157th overall pick

Career history
- Minnesota Vikings (2018–2021); New York Jets (2022–2024); Los Angeles Chargers (2025); Detroit Lions (2026–present)

Awards and highlights
- Third-team All-MAC (2017)

Career NFL statistics as of 2025
- Receptions: 270
- Receiving yards: 2,645
- Receiving touchdowns: 11
- Stats at Pro Football Reference

Tyler Conklin (born July 30, 1995) is an American professional football tight end for the Detroit Lions of the National Football League (NFL). He played one season of college basketball at Northwood before transferring to Central Michigan to play college football. He was selected by the Minnesota Vikings in the fifth round of the 2018 NFL draft.

== Early life ==
Conklin attended L'Anse Creuse High School - North in Macomb Township, Michigan, where he was a standout two-sport athlete, playing as a wide receiver in football and combo guard in basketball. As a junior, Conklin led his basketball team to the Class A Final Four, scoring 22 points in a 59–46 semifinal loss to eventual state champion Saginaw High.

== College career ==
After graduating from high school, Conklin was awarded a full-ride basketball scholarship to Division II Northwood University. He stayed for one semester and played in seven games, averaging 2.6 rebounds, 1.9 points and 1.4 assists per game. However, after the conclusion of the fall 2013 semester, Conklin realized he was unhappy and wanted to pursue a career in football. He transferred to Central Michigan University, where he walked on to the football team in the spring of 2014. The Central Michigan coaching staff initially wanted him to play defensive end, despite Conklin's strong desire to play tight end. He began the process of transferring again, this time to play tight end with his close friend and former high school quarterback at NAIA Siena Heights University. However, when the Central Michigan coaching staff learned of this, they convinced him to stay, agreeing to let him play tight end and assuring him that he'd have the opportunity to earn a scholarship in the spring of 2015.

Coming in at only 195 pounds, Conklin redshirted for his first season with the Chippewas, playing on the scout team while adding weight. After gaining 25 pounds during the offseason, he earned a scholarship and a role as a backup tight end for the 2015 season, playing in all 13 games and catching six passes for 95 yards. He became a starter as a redshirt sophomore in 2016, playing in 13 games with 11 starts, recording 42 receptions for 560 yards and six touchdowns.

During the first one-on-one drill of CMU's training camp in August 2017, Conklin broke a bone in his left foot and was diagnosed with a Jones Fracture. After his rehab went better than anticipated, Conklin was cleared to return to the field on October 7, 2017, for CMU's game against Ohio in which he set career-highs with 10 catches for 136 yards and two scores in a 26–23 victory. After missing five games due to his foot injury, Conklin finished his redshirt junior season with 35 receptions for 504 yards and five touchdowns in 8 games played. He was named Third-team All-MAC for his efforts in the 2017 season.

Conklin finished his career at Central Michigan with 83 catches for 1,159 yards and 11 touchdowns. Soon after graduating with a major in communications, Conklin received an invitation to the 2018 Senior Bowl in Mobile, Alabama, where he caught two passes including a 16-yard over-the-shoulder touchdown pass from Wyoming quarterback Josh Allen, whom the Buffalo Bills drafted at No. 7 overall.

== Professional career ==
Conklin performed well at the 2018 NFL Combine and ranked second among all tight ends in the vertical, fourth in the broad jump, fifth in the three-cone drill, and ninth in the 40-yard dash.

External videos
- Conklin gets drafted by Minnesota

Pre-draft measurables
Height	Weight	Arm length	Hand span	Wingspan	40-yard dash	10-yard split	20-yard split	20-yard shuttle	Three-cone drill	Vertical jump	Broad jump	Bench press
6 ft 3 in (1.91 m)	254 lb (115 kg)	33 in (0.84 m)	9 1/2 in (0.24 m)	6 ft 5 7/8 in (1.98 m)	4.80 s	1.60 s	2.78 s	4.23 s	7.13 s	38 in (0.97 m)	10 ft 0 in (3.05 m)	18 reps
All values from NFL Combine

=== Minnesota Vikings ===
Conklin was selected by the Minnesota Vikings in the fifth round (157th overall) of the 2018 NFL draft. On May 5, 2018, Conklin signed a four-year contract worth $2.741 million, including a signing bonus of $281,032. In the Vikings' season opener against the San Francisco 49ers, he had one reception for six yards in his NFL debut.

In Week 15 of the 2020 season against the Chicago Bears, Conklin recorded 3 catches for 57 yards and his first career receiving touchdown during the 33–27 loss.

=== New York Jets ===
On March 18, 2022, Conklin signed a three-year, $21 million contract with the New York Jets. He played in all 17 games (starting 16) for New York, recording 58 receptions for 552 yards and three touchdowns.

Conklin again appeared in all 17 games for the Jets during the 2023 campaign, compiling 62 receptions for 621 scoreless yards. He made 16 appearances (including 15 starts) for New York in 2024, recording 51 receptions for 449 yards and a career-high four touchdowns.

=== Los Angeles Chargers ===
On March 21, 2025, Conklin signed a one-year, $3 million contract with the Los Angeles Chargers. He made 13 appearances (five starts) for Los Angeles, splitting time with Oronde Gadsden II, and logged seven receptions for 101 yards.

=== Detroit Lions ===
On March 13, 2026, Conklin signed with the Detroit Lions on a one-year contract. On August 30, he was released by the Lions as a part of final roster cuts. On September 1, Detroit re–signed Conklin to their 53–man roster.

== NFL career statistics ==
Legend
**Bold**	Career high

=== Regular season ===
Year	Team	Games		Receiving					Rushing					Fumbles	
Year	Team	GP	GS	Rec	Yds	Avg	Lng	TD	Att	Yds	Avg	Lng	TD	Fum	Lost
2018	MIN	16	3	5	77	**15.4**	33	0	0	0	0.0	—	0	0	0
2019	MIN	15	1	8	58	7.3	20	0	0	0	0.0	—	0	0	0
2020	MIN	16	2	19	194	10.2	30	1	0	0	0.0	—	0	1	0
2021	MIN	17	15	**61**	593	9.7	**40**	3	0	0	0.0	—	0	1	0
2022	NYJ	17	16	58	552	9.5	30	3	**2**	**3**	1.5	**2**	0	**2**	**2**
2023	NYJ	17	12	**61**	**621**	10.2	37	0	1	0	0.0	0	0	0	0
2024	NYJ	16	15	51	449	8.8	27	**4**	1	0	0.0	0	0	0	0
2025	LAC	13	5	7	101	14.4	33	0	1	2	**2.0**	**2**	0	1	0
Career		127	69	270	2,645	9.8	40	11	5	5	1.0	2	0	5	2

=== Postseason ===
Year	Team	Games		Receiving					Rushing					Fumbles	
Year	Team	GP	GS	Rec	Yds	Avg	Lng	TD	Att	Yds	Avg	Lng	TD	Fum	Lost
2019	MIN	2	0	1	5	5.0	5	0	0	0	0.0	0	0	0	0
Career		2	0	1	5	5.0	5	0	0	0	0.0	0	0	0	0
