= L'Anse Creuse High School =

Location
- 38495 L'Anse Creuse Road; Harrison Township, Michigan 48045; United States

Information
- School type: Public, magnet high school
- School district: L'Anse Creuse Public Schools
- CEEB code: 232654
- Principal: Alysia Samborsky
- Teaching staff: 60.20 (FTE)
- Grades: 9–12
- Enrollment: 1,214 (2023–2024)
- Student to teacher ratio: 20.17
- Colors: Royal blue and white
- Nickname: Lancer
- Website: www.lc-ps.org/schools/hs/lchs

L'Anse Creuse High School is a public, magnet high school in Harrison Township, Michigan, United States. It is one of two high schools in the L'Anse Creuse Public Schools district, with the other being L'Anse Creuse High School - North.

== Demographics ==
The demographic breakdown of the 1,246 students enrolled in 2024-2025 was:

- Male - 48.8%
- Female - 51.2%
- Native American/Alaskan - 10.7%
- Asian/Pacific islanders - 5.4%
- Black - 72.4%
- Hispanic - 29.8%
- White - 68.2%
- Multiracial - 12.5%

Additionally, 33.9% of the students were eligible for free or reduced lunch.

== Notable alumni ==
- Uncle Kracker, musician and rapper
- Frank Nazar, collegiate ice hockey center
- Lary Sorensen, former Detroit Tigers announcer and former MLB player
