= Wolcott Mill Metropark =

Huron-Clinton Metropark in Ray Township, Michigan

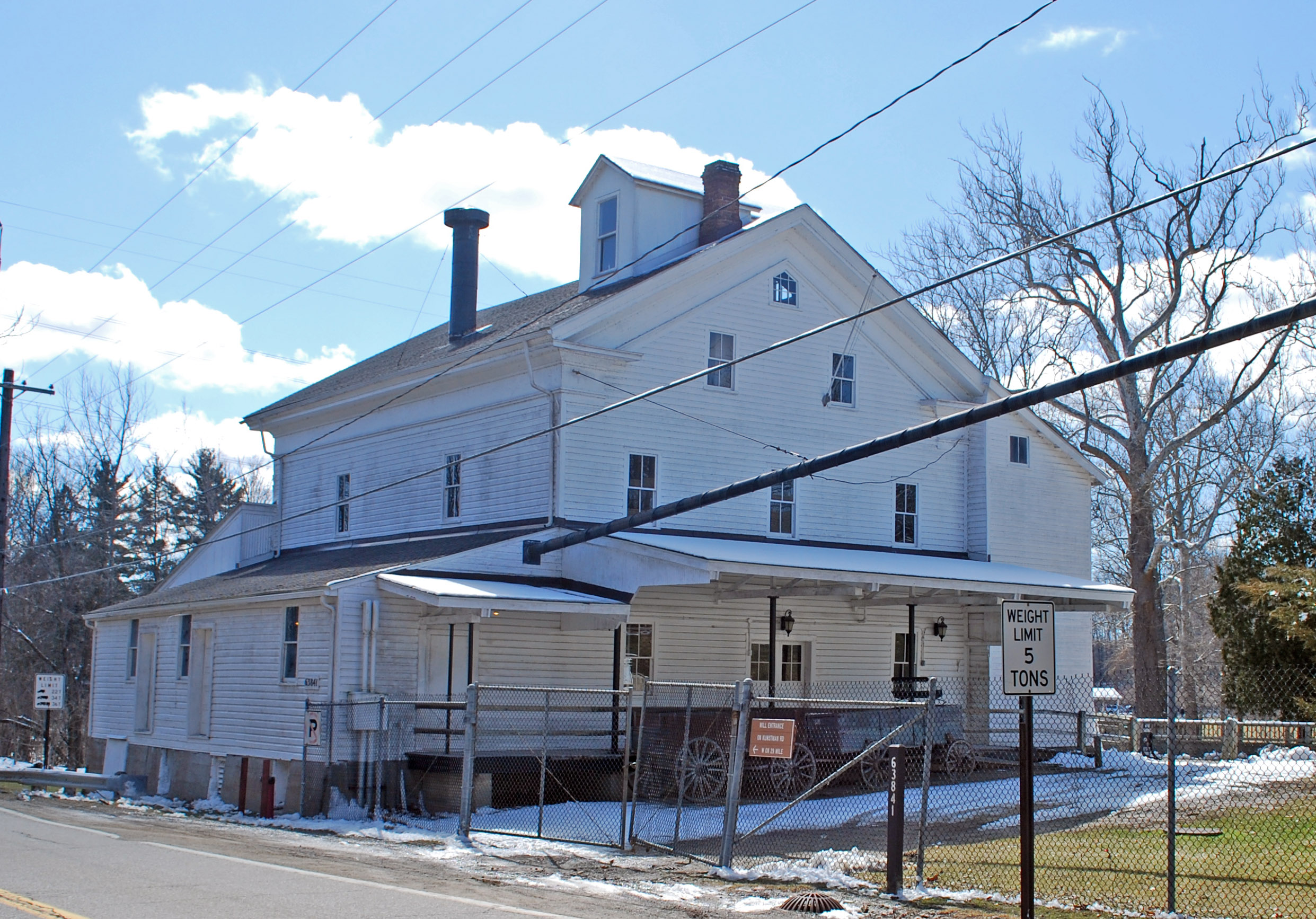
- Wolcott Mill

- Location within Huron-Clinton Metroparks
- Type: Regional park
- Location: Lower Peninsula, Macomb County, Michigan USA
- Coordinates: 42.77552°N 82.94215°W
- Area: 2,625 acres (1,062 ha)
- Operator: Huron–Clinton Metroparks
- Status: Open year round
- Website: Official site

Wolcott Mill Metropark is a Huron-Clinton Metropark located in rural Ray Township, Michigan. The northern branch of the Clinton River is a fixture of the park as it bisects the entirety of the park.

== History ==
Huron-Clinton Metroparks Authority began assembling land for the park around 1973. The historic Wolcott Mill was purchased by Macomb Community College in the mid-1960s, but the college chose not to establish a campus there and sold the mill to the Metroparks Authority in 1979. The mill was intended to be the centerpiece of the park, which would span 3,000 acres and utilize agriculturally-poor land within the Clinton River's floodplain. Some residents of Ray Township opposed the park, expecting it to lower property values due to the influx of park users.

Plans were scaled back in 1985, but by early 1986, the park still had not opened because Ray Township would not approve permits for the park. The Metroparks Authority changed its vision for the park, as the township did not want a "picnic park" with beaches in the vein of Stony Creek Metropark but was more amenable to an "attraction park" with a historic village that might be developed in the future, or a nature center.

The mill opened in May 1987 for guided group tours by appointment, and by 1989, it was open for self-guided tours.

By 1993, the park's Farm Learning Center was being developed, aided by the donation of two Percheron draft houses in 1994. By 1995, sheep and cows had been added and the farm was growing all food for the animals. Inspired by the farm at Kensington Metropark, it was to be a test-bed for crop and fertilizer experimentation in cooperation with Michigan State University. The farm became more accessible to the public with the construction of a parking lot and restrooms in 1997.

== The park ==
The park covers 2,625 acres (1,062 hectares) and features a variety of activities. Wolcott Mill has 10 miles (16 km) of equestrian trails. A former 18-hole golf course closed and is now walking trails. Wolcott Mill also has "Camp Rotary", a camping area for organized youth groups.

== The mill ==
The park's namesake mill was built in 1847 and operated until 1967. The mill was both a grist and a feed mill, and the machinery used for this purpose is still viewable. In addition, there are exhibits, demonstrations, and other buildings viewable in the Mill complex. The barn museum features the history of American barns, a buggy, antique farming equipment and tools. The various hiking trails of Wolcott Mill also start near the Mill complex.

== The farm ==
Wolcott Mill has a 250-acre (101 hectares) working farm. The farm has a herd of dairy cows as well as chickens, goats, pigs, sheep, and horses. There are also a variety of crops planted in the fields surrounding the farm.
