= Football Digest =

- Categories: sports magazine
- Final issue: November 2005
- Country: United States
- Language: English
- ISSN: 0015-6760

Football Digest was a sports magazine for fans interested in professional American football, with in-depth coverage of the National Football League (NFL). The magazine modeled the Reader's Digest idea, to bring the best in football journalism from newspapers and magazines that the fans would have otherwise not had an opportunity to read.

The final issue was published in November 2005.

It also had its own independent All-Rookie team which began in 1971 and its own All-pro team which began in the 1980s. The All-Pro team was chosen by the editorial staff which gave them the freedom to choose otherwise less-publicized players on the second-team selections. By interviewing coaches and players the editors felt they got the inside "scoop" on who the "sleepers" were for an All-Pro Team.

The magazine's issues from 1971 to 1981 are available at the Internet Archive.

== Awards ==
=== NFL Player of the Year ===
- 1973: O. J. Simpson, RB, Buffalo Bills
- 1974: Ken Stabler, QB, Oakland Raiders
- 1975: O. J. Simpson, RB, Buffalo Bills
- 1976: Ken Stabler, QB, Oakland Raiders
- 1977: Walter Payton, RB, Chicago Bears
- 1978: Earl Campbell, RB, Houston Oilers
- 1979: Dan Fouts, QB, San Diego Chargers
- 1980: Brian Sipe, QB, Cleveland Browns
- 1981: Ken Anderson, QB, Cincinnati Bengals
- 1982: Joe Theismann, QB, Washington Redskins
- 1983: Joe Theismann, QB, Washington Redskins
- 1984: Dan Marino, QB, Miami Dolphins
- 1985: Marcus Allen, RB, Los Angeles Raiders
- 1986: Lawrence Taylor, OLB, New York Giants
- 1987: Jerry Rice, WR, San Francisco 49ers
- 1988: Boomer Esiason, QB, Cincinnati Bengals
- 1989: Joe Montana, QB, San Francisco 49ers
- 1990: Randall Cunningham, QB, Philadelphia Eagles
- 1991: Barry Sanders, RB, Detroit Lions
- 1992: Steve Young, QB, San Francisco 49ers
- 1993: Emmitt Smith, RB, Dallas Cowboys
- 1994: Barry Sanders, RB, Detroit Lions
- 1995: Brett Favre, QB, Green Bay Packers
- 1996: Brett Favre, QB, Green Bay Packers
- 1997: Barry Sanders, RB, Detroit Lions
- 1998: Terrell Davis, RB, Denver Broncos
- 1999: Kurt Warner, QB, St. Louis Rams
- 2000: Marshall Faulk, RB, St. Louis Rams
- 2001: Kurt Warner, QB, St. Louis Rams
- 2002: Rich Gannon, QB, Oakland Raiders
- 2003: Peyton Manning, QB, Indianapolis Colts
- 2004: Peyton Manning, QB, Indianapolis Colts

=== NFL Defensive Player of the Year ===
- 1992: Junior Seau, ILB, San Diego Chargers
- 1993: Deion Sanders, CB, Atlanta Falcons
- 1994: Charles Haley, DE, Dallas Cowboys
- 1995: Merton Hanks, S, San Francisco 49ers
- 1996: Bruce Smith, DE, Buffalo Bills
- 1997: Dana Stubblefield, DT, San Francisco 49ers
- 1998: Junior Seau, ILB, San Diego Chargers
- 1999: Warren Sapp, DT, Tampa Bay Buccaneers
- 2000: Ray Lewis, MLB, Baltimore Ravens
- 2001: Brian Urlacher, MLB, Chicago Bears
- 2002: Derrick Brooks, OLB, Tampa Bay Buccaneers
- 2003: Ray Lewis, ILB, Baltimore Ravens
- 2004: Ed Reed, S, Baltimore Ravens

=== NFL Defensive Back of the Year ===
- 1973: Jack Tatum, Oakland Raiders
- 1974: Jake Scott, Miami Dolphins
- 1975: Mel Blount, Pittsburgh Steelers
- 1976: Monte Jackson, Los Angeles Rams
- 1977: Louis Wright, Denver Broncos
- 1978: Thom Darden, Cleveland Browns
- 1979: Lemar Parrish, Washington Redskins
- 1980: Nolan Cromwell, Los Angeles Rams
- 1981: Nolan Cromwell, Los Angeles Rams
- 1982: Nolan Cromwell, Los Angeles Rams
- 1983: Nolan Cromwell, Los Angeles Rams
- 1984: Kenny Easley, Seattle Seahawks
- 1985: Wes Hopkins, Philadelphia Eagles
- 1986: Ronnie Lott, San Francisco 49ers
- 1987: Ronnie Lott, San Francisco 49ers
- 1988: Joey Browner, Minnesota Vikings

=== NFL Defensive Linemen of the Year ===
- 1973: Alan Page, Minnesota Vikings
- 1974: Joe Greene, Pittsburgh Steelers
- 1975: Joe Greene, Pittsburgh Steelers
- 1976: Wally Chambers, Chicago Bears
- 1977: Harvey Martin, Dallas Cowboys
- 1978: Bubba Baker, Detroit Lions
- 1979: Lee Roy Selmon, Tampa Bay Buccaneers
- 1980: Randy White, Dallas Cowboys
- 1981: Joe Klecko, New York Jets
- 1982: Mark Gastineau, New York Jets
- 1983: Doug Betters, Miami Dolphins
- 1984: Mark Gastineau, New York Jets
- 1985: Howie Long, Los Angeles Raiders
- 1986: Reggie White, Philadelphia Eagles
- 1987: Reggie White, Philadelphia Eagles
- 1988: Dan Hampton, Chicago Bears

=== NFL Linebacker of the Year ===
- 1973: Lee Roy Jordan, Dallas Cowboys
- 1974: Mike Curtis, Baltimore Colts
- 1975: Jack Ham, Pittsburgh Steelers
- 1976: Jack Lambert, Pittsburgh Steelers
- 1977: Jack Ham, Pittsburgh Steelers
- 1978: Randy Gradishar, Denver Broncos
- 1979: Randy Gradishar, Denver Broncos
- 1980: Ted Hendricks, Oakland Raiders
- 1981: Lawrence Taylor, New York Giants
- 1982: Lawrence Taylor, New York Giants
- 1983: Lawrence Taylor, New York Giants
- 1984: Lawrence Taylor, New York Giants
- 1985: Mike Singletary, Chicago Bears
- 1986: Lawrence Taylor, New York Giants
- 1987: Andre Tippett, New England Patriots
- 1988: Mike Singletary, Chicago Bears

=== NFL Offensive Lineman of the Year ===
- 1973: Ron Yary, Minnesota Vikings
- 1974: Larry Little, Miami Dolphins
- 1975: Dan Dierdorf, St. Louis Cardinals
- 1976: John Hannah, New England Patriots
- 1977: Art Shell, Oakland Raiders
- 1978: John Hannah, New England Patriots
- 1979: John Hannah, New England Patriots
- 1980: John Hannah, New England Patriots
- 1981: Anthony Muñoz, Cincinnati Bengals
- 1982: Anthony Muñoz, Cincinnati Bengals
- 1983: John Hannah, New England Patriots
- 1984: Russ Grimm, Washington Redskins

=== NFL Running Back of the Year ===
- 1973: O. J. Simpson, Buffalo Bills
- 1974: Otis Armstrong, Denver Broncos
- 1975: O. J. Simpson, Buffalo Bills
- 1976: O. J. Simpson, Buffalo Bills
- 1977: Walter Payton, Chicago Bears
- 1978: Earl Campbell, Houston Oilers
- 1979: Earl Campbell, Houston Oilers
- 1980: Earl Campbell, Houston Oilers
- 1981: Tony Dorsett, Dallas Cowboys
- 1982: Marcus Allen, Los Angeles Raiders
- 1983: Eric Dickerson, Los Angeles Rams
- 1984: Eric Dickerson, Los Angeles Rams
- 1985: Marcus Allen, Los Angeles Raiders
- 1986: Eric Dickerson, Los Angeles Rams
- 1987: Eric Dickerson, Indianapolis Colts
- 1988: Roger Craig, San Francisco 49ers

=== NFL Receiver of the Year ===
- 1973: Paul Warfield, Miami Dolphins
- 1974: Cliff Branch, Oakland Raiders
- 1975: Lynn Swann, Pittsburgh Steelers
- 1976: Cliff Branch, Oakland Raiders
- 1977: Drew Pearson, Dallas Cowboys
- 1978: Lynn Swann, Pittsburgh Steelers
- 1979: John Jefferson, San Diego Chargers
- 1980: John Jefferson, San Diego Chargers
- 1981: Kellen Winslow, San Diego Chargers
- 1982: Wes Chandler, San Diego Chargers
- 1983: James Lofton, Green Bay Packers
- 1984: Roy Green, St. Louis Cardinals
- 1985: Mike Quick, Philadelphia Eagles
- 1986: Jerry Rice, San Francisco 49ers
- 1987: Jerry Rice, San Francisco 49ers
- 1988: Anthony Carter, Minnesota Vikings

=== NFL Quarterback of the Year ===
- 1973: Bob Griese, Miami Dolphins
- 1974: Ken Stabler, Oakland Raiders
- 1975: Fran Tarkenton, Minnesota Vikings
- 1976: Ken Stabler, Oakland Raiders
- 1977: Bob Griese, Miami Dolphins
- 1978: Terry Bradshaw, Pittsburgh Steelers
- 1979: Dan Fouts, San Diego Chargers
- 1980: Brian Sipe, Cleveland Browns
- 1981: Ken Anderson, Cincinnati Bengals
- 1982: Joe Theismann, Washington Redskins
- 1983: Joe Theismann, Washington Redskins
- 1984: Dan Marino, Miami Dolphins
- 1985: Dan Marino, Miami Dolphins
- 1986: Dan Marino, Miami Dolphins
- 1987: Joe Montana, San Francisco 49ers
- 1988: Boomer Esiason, Cincinnati Bengals

=== NFL Specialists of the Year ===
- 1974: Terry Metcalf, St. Louis Cardinals
- 1975: Billy (White Shoes) Johnson, Houston Oilers
- 1976: Rick Upchurch, Denver Broncos
- 1977: Billy (White Shoes) Johnson, Houston Oilers
- 1978: Rick Upchurch, Denver Broncos
- 1979: Rich Mauti, New Orleans Saints
- 1980: J. T. Smith, Kansas City Chiefs
- 1981: Mike Nelms, Washington Redskins
- 1982: Rick Upchurch, Denver Broncos
- 1983: Billy (White Shoes) Johnson, Atlanta Falcons

=== NFL Kicker of the Year ===
- 1974: Chester Marcol, Green Bay Packers
- 1975: Jim Bakken, St. Louis Cardinals
- 1976: Jim Bakken, St. Louis Cardinals
- 1977: Ray Guy, Oakland Raiders
- 1978: Ray Guy, Oakland Raiders
- 1979: Toni Fritsch, Houston Oilers
- 1980: Dave Jennings, New York Giants
- 1981: Pat McInally, Cincinnati Bengals
- 1982: Mark Moseley, Washington Redskins
- 1983: Ali Haji-Sheikh, New York Giants

=== NFL Coach of the Year ===
- 1974: Don Coryell, St. Louis Cardinals
- 1975: Ted Marchibroda, Baltimore Colts
- 1976: Chuck Fairbanks, New England Patriots
- 1977: Red Miller, Denver Broncos
- 1978: Walt Michaels, New York Jets
- 1979: Dick Vermeil, Philadelphia Eagles
- 1980: Chuck Knox, Buffalo Bills
- 1981: Bill Walsh, San Francisco 49ers
- 1982: Joe Gibbs, Washington Redskins
- 1983: Joe Gibbs, Washington Redskins
- 1984: Chuck Knox, Seattle Seahawks
- 1985: Mike Ditka, Chicago Bears
- 1986: Bill Parcells, New York Giants
- 1987: Jim Mora, New Orleans Saints
- 1988: Mike Ditka, Chicago Bears
- 1989: Lindy Infante, Green Bay Packers
- 1990: Don Shula, Miami Dolphins
- 1991: Jimmy Johnson, Dallas Cowboys
- 1992: Bobby Ross, San Diego Chargers
- 1993: Dan Reeves, New York Giants
- 1994: Bill Parcells, New England Patriots
- 1995: Ray Rhodes, Philadelphia Eagles
- 1996: Dom Capers, Carolina Panthers
- 1997: Marty Schottenheimer, Kansas City Chiefs
- 1998: Dan Reeves, Atlanta Falcons
- 1999: Dick Vermeil, St. Louis Rams.
- 2000: Andy Reid, Philadelphia Eagles
- 2001: Dick Jauron, Chicago Bears
- 2002: Jeff Fisher, Tennessee Titans
- 2003: Bill Belichick, New England Patriots

=== NFL Offensive Rookie of the Year ===
- 1971, Jim Plunkett, QB, New England Patriots
- 1972, Franco Harris, RB, Pittsburgh Steelers
- 1973, Boobie Clark, RB, Cincinnati Bengals
- 1974, Don Woods, RB, San Diego Chargers
- 1975, Mike Thomas, RB, Washington Redskins
- 1976, Sammy White, WR, Minnesota Vikings
- 1977, Tony Dorsett, RB, Dallas Cowboys
- 1978, Earl Campbell, RB, Houston Oilers
- 1979, Ottis Anderson, RB, St. Louis Cardinals
- 1980, Billy Sims, RB, Detroit Lions
- 1981, George Rogers, RB, New Orleans Saints
- 1982, Marcus Allen, RB, Oakland Raiders
- 1983, Eric Dickerson, RB, Los Angeles Rams
- 1984, Greg Bell, RB, Pittsburgh Steelers
- 1985, Kevin Mack, RB, Cleveland Browns
- 1986, Herschel Walker, RB, Dallas Cowboys
- 1987, Bo Jackson, RB, Oakland Raiders
- 1988, Keith Jackson, TE, Philadelphia Eagles
- 1989, Barry Sanders, RB, Detroit Lions
- 1990, Johnny Johnson, RB, Phoenix Cardinals
- 1991, Leonard Russell, RB, New England Patriots
- 1992, Carl Pickens, WR, Cincinnati Bengals
- 1993, Rick Mirer, QB, Seattle Seahawks
- 1994, Marshall Faulk, RB, Indianapolis Colts
- 1995, Terrell Davis, RB, Denver Broncos
- 1996, Eddie George, RB, Houston Oilers
- 1997, Warrick Dunn, RB, Tampa Bay Buccaneers
- 1998, Randy Moss, WR, Minnesota Vikings
- 1999, Edgerrin James, RB, Indianapolis Colts
- 2000, Mike Anderson, RB, Denver Broncos
- 2001, Chris Chambers, WR, Miami Dolphins
- 2002, Clinton Portis, RB, Denver Broncos
- 2003, Anquan Boldin, WR, Arizona Cardinals

=== NFL Defensive Rookie of the Year ===
- 1971, Isiah Robertson, LB, Los Angeles Rams
- 1972, Tommy Casanova, DB, Cincinnati Bengals
- 1973, Wally Chambers, DE, Chicago Bears
- 1974, Jack Lambert, LB, Pittsburgh Steelers
- 1975, Robert Brazile, LB, Houston Oilers
- 1976, Mike Haynes, CB, New England Patriots
- 1977, A. J. Duhe, LB, Miami Dolphins
- 1977, Bob Baumhower, NT, Miami Dolphins
- 1978, Al "Bubba" Baker, DE, Detroit Lions
- 1979, Jim Haslett, LB, Buffalo Bills
- 1980, Buddy Curry, LB, Atlanta Falcons
- 1981, Lawrence Taylor, LB, New York Giants
- 1982, Vernon Dean, DB, Washington Redskins
- 1983, Vernon Maxwell, LB, Baltimore Colts
- 1984, Rick Bryan, DT, Atlanta Falcons
- 1985, Reggie White, DT, Philadelphia Eagles
- 1986, Leslie O'Neal, DE, San Diego Chargers
- 1987, Shane Conlan, LB, Buffalo Bills
- 1988, Erik McMillan, S, New York Jets
- 1989, Steve Atwater, LB, Denver Broncos
- 1990, Mark Carrier, S, Chicago Bears
- 1991, Mike Croel, LB, Denver Broncos
- 1992, Santana Dotson, DT, Tampa Bay Buccaneers
- 1993, Dana Stubblefield, DE, San Francisco 49ers
- 1994, Antonio Langham, CB, Cleveland Browns
- 1995, Hugh Douglas, DE, New York Jets
- 1996, Zach Thomas, MLB, Miami Dolphins
- 1997, Peter Boulware, LB, Baltimore Ravens
- 1998, Charles Woodson, CB, Oakland Raiders
- 1999, Jevon Kearse, DE, Tennessee Titans
- 2000, Brian Urlacher, LB, Chicago Bears
- 2001, Kendrell Bell, LB, Pittsburgh Steelers
- 2002, Julius Peppers, DE, Carolina Panthers
- 2003, Charles Tillman, CB, Chicago Bears
