= New Haven Community Schools =

School district in Michigan

Address
- 30375 Clark Street New Haven, Macomb, Michigan, 48048; United States

District information
- Grades: Pre-Kindergarten-12
- Superintendent: Cheryl Puzdrakiewicz
- Schools: 4
- Budget: $23,815,000 2022-2023 expenditures
- NCES District ID: 2625230

Students and staff
- Students: 1,555 (2024-2025)
- Teachers: 89.06 (on an FTE basis) (2024-2025)
- Staff: 223.52 FTE (2024-2025)
- Student–teacher ratio: 17.46 (2024-2025)

Other information
- Website: www.newhaven.misd.net

New Haven Community Schools is a public school district in Macomb County, Michigan. It serves New Haven and parts of the townships of Chesterfield, Lenox, Macomb and Ray.

== History ==
The administration building at 30375 Clark Street was the original high school for the district. It was built in 1922 and the first class graduated in 1924.

A 1962 article in the Port Huron Times-Herald reported that the district had 1,329 students in three schools: E.F. Siefert Elementary, Frank Lemmon School, and the high school.

In 1965, the district hired architect Ralph B. Fortney, who had designed Siefert Elementary, to design the district's new high school. The high school was under construction by 1967, but the unfinished school was twice damaged by storms: In April, three walls of the gymnasium were blown down in a tornado, and the fourth wall was blown down in June. The structure was rebuilt by September, and as of that month completion was planned for May 1968. However, a trade union strike delayed the opening to late October, 1968. After the current high school was built, Lemmon Elementary remained in the Clark Street building.

New Haven Elementary opened in fall 2004. The middle school then moved from the Clark Street building to the Siefert Elementary building, at 24125 26 Mile Road. Siefert was replaced by the Endeavor Elementary/Middle School, which opened in fall 2010.

In 2024, a bond issue passed to renovate and reopen Siefert Elementary. It is planned to reopen in 2027.

== Schools ==
Schools in New Haven Community Schools district
| School | Address | Notes |
|---|---|---|
| New Haven High School | 57700 Gratiot Ave, New Haven | Grades 9-12. Built 1968. |
| New Haven Elementary | 57701 River Oaks Drive, New Haven | Grades K-4. Built 2004. |
| Endeavour Elementary and Middle School | 22505 26 Mile Road, Ray Township | Grades K-8 |
| Early Childhood Programs | 30375 Clark Street, New Haven | Preschool housed in district administration building. |
| Lake Huron Virtual Hybrid High School | https://www.myvirtualacademy.com | Online learning |
