= Ray Township, Michigan =

- Civil township
- Township of Ray
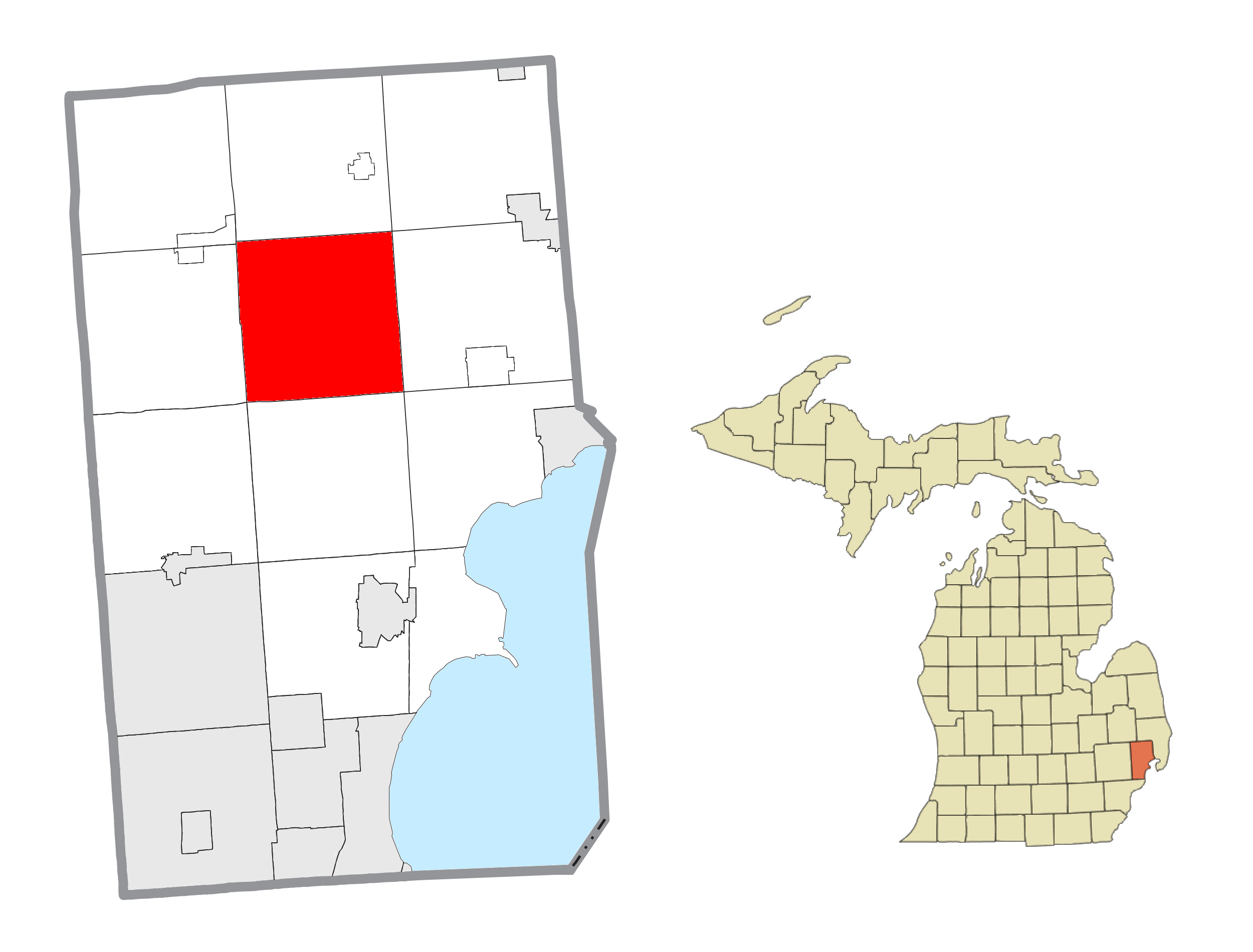
- Location within Macomb County

- Location within Michigan Location within the United States
- Coordinates: 42°45′28″N 82°55′16″W
- Country: United States
- State: Michigan
- County: Macomb

Government
  - Supervisor: Eric Crump
  - Clerk: Lori R. Lascoe
  - Treasurer: Betsy Bart

Area
  - Total: 36.6 sq mi (95 km^{2})
  - Land: 36.5 sq mi (95 km^{2})
  - Water: 0.1 sq mi (0.26 km^{2})
- Elevation: 650 ft (198 m)

Population (2020)
  - Total: 3,780
  - Density: 103.5/sq mi (40.0/km^{2})
- Time zone: UTC-5 (Eastern (EST))
  - Summer (DST): UTC-4 (EDT)
- ZIP Code: 48096
- Area code: 586
- FIPS code: 26-67420
- GNIS feature ID: 1626955
- Website: www.raytwp.org

Ray Township is a civil township of Macomb County in the U.S. state of Michigan. As of the 2020 census, the township population was 3,780.

== Geography ==
The township is in north-central Macomb County. The village of Romeo touches the northwest corner of the township. The city of Richmond is 12 miles (19 km) to the northeast, and Mount Clemens, the Macomb county seat, is the same distance to the south. The township is within Metro Detroit, with downtown Detroit 32 miles (51 km) to the south-southwest.

According to the U.S. Census Bureau, Ray Township has a total area of 36.6 square miles (95 km^{2}), of which 0.1 square miles (0.3 km^{2}), or 0.26%, are water. The township is fully within the Clinton River watershed, flowing to Lake St. Clair east of Mount Clemens.

Wolcott Mill Metropark, a 2,625 acres (10.62 km^{2}) park, is located entirely within the township. The park is home to the Wolcott Mill, built in 1847.

== Communities ==
There are no incorporated villages within the township, but there are several unincorporated communities:

- Davis, originally called Brooklyn and renamed Davis in 1876 (to avoid confusion with Brooklyn in Jackson County), is located in the southwest corner of the township at Romeo Plank and 27 Mile roads (42°43′51″N 82°57′37″W ; Elevation: 653 ft./199 m.). Davis was a thriving small community for several decades, peaking in the 1940s. Today, it houses a Baptist church, a Masonic Temple & banquet hall, a cemetery, and stores and other businesses.
- Meade is located in the southeast portion of the township at 42°43′03″N 82°52′26″W on the boundary with Macomb Township at 26 Mile Road and North Avenue.
- Ray Center is located east of the center of the township at Hartway and 29 Mile roads west of Indian Trail (42°45′42″N 82°54′05″W ; Elevation: 643 ft./196 m.).
- Wolcott Mills is located at Wolcott Road and Indian Trail (42°46′08″N 82°55′37″W ; Elevation: 682 ft./208 m.).

== Demographics ==
As of the 2020 census, the population of Ray Township was 3,780.

As of the 2010 census, the population was 3,739. There were 1,404 households and 1,112 families. The population was 96.4% non-Hispanic white, 0.4% African-American, 0.3% Native American, 0.7% Asian, 0.5% reporting two or more races and 1.7% Latino.

As of the census of 2000, there were 3,740 people, 1,305 households, and 1,062 families residing in the township. The population density was 101.5 inhabitants per square mile (39.2/km^{2}). There were 1,349 housing units at an average density of 36.6 per square mile (14.1/km^{2}). The racial makeup of the township was 97.78% White, 0.16% African American, 0.29% Native American, 0.37% Asian, 0.45% from other races, and 0.94% from two or more races. Hispanic or Latino of any race were 1.18% of the population.

There were 1,305 households, out of which 36.9% had children under the age of 18 living with them, 73.0% were married couples living together, 4.8% had a female householder with no husband present, and 18.6% were non-families. 15.9% of all households were made up of individuals, and 5.2% had someone living alone who was 65 years of age or older. The average household size was 2.84 and the average family size was 3.17.

In the township the population was spread out, with 25.7% under the age of 18, 6.4% from 18 to 24, 30.3% from 25 to 44, 28.2% from 45 to 64, and 9.4% who were 65 years of age or older. The median age was 39 years. For every 100 females, there were 104.7 males. For every 100 females age 18 and over, there were 106.2 males.

The median income for a household in the township was $70,081, and the median income for a family was $76,880. Males had a median income of $51,261 versus $26,830 for females. The per capita income for the township was $26,604. About 1.4% of families and 1.8% of the population were below the poverty line, including 1.7% of those under age 18 and 7.3% of those age 65 or over.

== Government ==
Ray Township is governed under state statute by an elected board of trustees with 2 trustees and includes a supervisor, clerk and treasurer. The three of which serve as executive officers of the township with the supervisor, chairs the board and is in charge of assessing and general all other matters outside the clerk's and treasurer's authority. For public library services, the Township runs the Ray Township Library in Wolcott Mills.

School district serving the Township residents are Armada Area Schools, New Haven Community Schools, Romeo Community Schools and Utica Community Schools. Road maintenance is handled by the Macomb County Department of Roads.

District	Number	Officeholder
U.S. Representative	10th	Lisa McClain
State Senate	8th	[[]]
State Representative	33rd	Paul J. Montone
County Commissioner	1st District	Don Brown
