= Chippewa Valley High School =

Public magnet high school in Clinton Township, Michigan

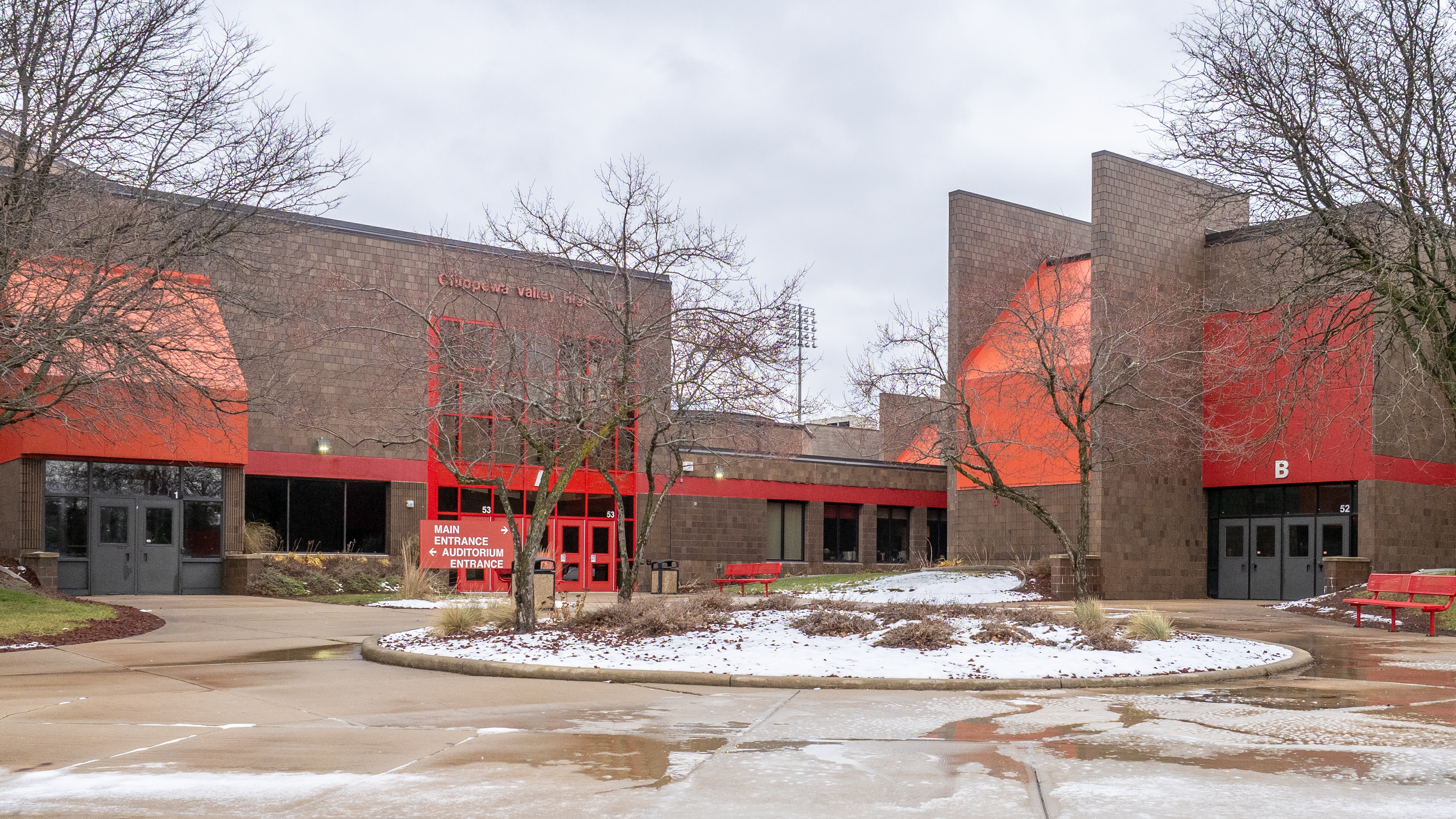

Location
- 18300 19 Mile Rd. Clinton Township, Michigan 48038; United States
- Coordinates: 42°36′44″N 82°56′06″W

Information
- School type: Public, magnet high school
- Established: 1961
- School district: Chippewa Valley Schools
- Principal: Todd Distelrath
- Staff: 101.30 (on an FTE basis)
- Grades: 9-12
- Enrollment: 2,208 (2023-2024)
- Student to teacher ratio: 21.80
- Campus: Suburban
- Colors: Red and white
- Athletics conference: Macomb Area Conference
- Nickname: Big Reds
- Rivals: Dakota, Romeo
- Feeder schools: Algonquin, Iroquois, Wyandot
- Website: www.chippewavalleyschools.org/schools/high-schools/cvhs/

Student assessments
- 2021–22 school year Change vs. prior year

M-STEP 11th grade proficiency rates (Science / Social Studies)
- Advanced %: 11.9 / 8.5
- Proficient %: 22.8 / 25.5
- PR. Proficient %: 19.2 / 51.6
- Not Proficient %: 46.1 / 14.5

Average test scores
- SAT Total: 939.3 (▼ −25.3)

Chippewa Valley High School is a public, magnet high school located in Clinton Township, Michigan, United States. It serves grades 9–12 for the Chippewa Valley Schools.

== Demographics ==
The demographic breakdown of the 2,431 students enrolled for 2017-18 was:

- Male - 50.0%
- Female - 50.0%
- Native American/Alaskan - 0.1%
- Asian - 2.1%
- Black - 17.1%
- Hispanic - 5.7%
- Native Hawaiian/Pacific islanders - 0.1%
- White - 69.6%
- Multiracial - 5.3%

36.0% of the students were eligible for free or reduced-cost lunch.

== Athletics ==
Chippewa Valley's Big Reds compete in the Macomb Area Conference, and the school colors are red and white. The following Michigan High School Athletic Association (MHSAA) sanctioned sports are offered:

- Baseball (boys)
- Basketball (girls and boys)
- Bowling (girls and boys)
- Competitive cheerleading (girls)
- Cross country (girls and boys)
- Football (boys)
  - State champion - 2001, 2018
- Golf (girls and boys)
- Ice hockey (boys)
- Lacrosse (girls and boys)
- Soccer (girls and boys)
- Softball (girls)
- Swim and dive (girls and boys)
- Tennis (girls and boys)
- Track and field (girls and boys)
- Volleyball (girls)
- Wrestling (boys)

== Notable alumni ==
- Joe Block — play-by-play announcer for the Pittsburgh Pirates
- Paul Feig — creator of the Freaks and Geeks TV series
- Kelly Gunther — speed skater, member of US Olympic team
- David Hahn — the "Radioactive Boy Scout"
- Sean Murphy-Bunting — NFL player
- Carey Torrice — Michigan politician
- Jeff Zatkoff — ice hockey goaltender
