= Mount Clemens High School =

Location
- 155 Cass Ave; Mount Clemens, Michigan 48043; United States; 42°35′48″N 82°53′02″W

Information
- Type: Public high school
- School district: Mount Clemens Community Schools
- Teaching staff: 13.46 (on an FTE basis)
- Grades: 9-12
- Enrollment: 245 (2016-2017)
- Student to teacher ratio: 19.17
- Campus: Suburb, large
- Colors: Red & gray
- Nickname: Battling Bathers
- Website: www.mtcps.org/schools/mount-clemens-high-school-9-12/

Mount Clemens High School was established in the 19th century. It is located in Mount Clemens, Michigan, United States. It is a part of Mount Clemens Community Schools.

== History ==
- 1834 - Mount Clemens Community School District was formed
- 1859 - Union School was built on present Macomb School site
- 1924 - Mount Clemens High School opened on current site
- 1967 - Mount Clemens High School addition was built

== Notable alumni ==
- Kim Adams, television news personality
- Mark Brewer, chair of the Michigan Democratic Party
- Wally Chambers, NFL football player
- Connie Kalitta, Hall of Fame race car driver

== See also ==
- Mount Clemens Community Schools
