= Wolcott Mill =

- U.S. National Register of Historic Places
- U.S. Historic district
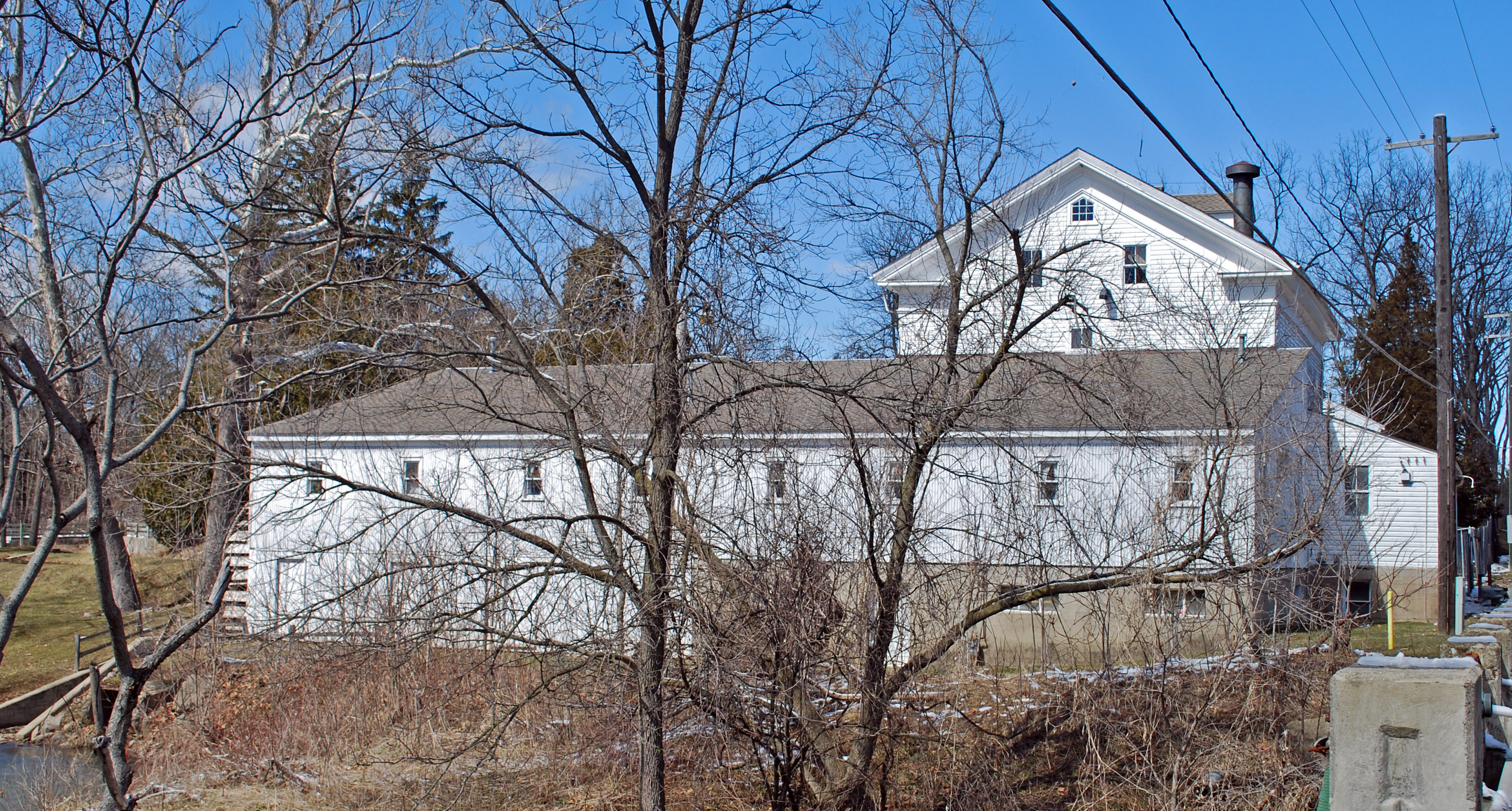

- Location within Michigan Location within the United States
- Interactive map
- Location: 63841 Wolcott Road, Ray Township, Michigan
- Coordinates: 42°45′58″N 82°55′36″W
- Built: 1847
- Architectural style: Greek Revival
- NRHP reference No.: 09001063
- Added to NRHP: December 8, 2009

The Wolcott Mill is a grist and feed mill located in Ray Township, Michigan. It was listed on the National Register of Historic Places in 2009.

== History ==
The Wolcott Mill was constructed in 1847 by a miller named Freeman, and was operated as a grist mill and feed mill. The mill passed through multiple owners, including John Smith, Norman Crawford, and Frank Ritter, before being purchased by Fred B. Wolcott in 1878.

Fred Wolcott was born in Bradford County, Pennsylvania in 1845, the son of J.P. and Rebecca Rogers Wolcott. He worked in a sawmill in Pennsylvania, then moved west to Wisconsin in 1865. He moved from there to Nebraska, then Wyoming, Utah, and California in succession, before returning to Nebraska where his father had subsequently settled, in 1869. There he homesteaded a tract of land, and in 1870 married Miss Anna C. Callahan. The couple had twelve children: A. E., John P., Fred H., William H., Frank O., Lewis J., Rebecca, Ida May, Anna, Rosa M., Mary, and Lillie.

Wolcott improved his homestead property for nine years until 1878, when he traded the Nebraska tract for the mill located in Ray, Michigan. Wolcott rebuilt part of the mill, adding new machinery and another barn to the property. The Wolcott Mill was known for its high-quality flour, and a number of large Detroit bakeries, including Acme Pie and Oven King Cookies, used Wolcott Mill flour for their pastries and desserts. Fred Wolcott operated the mill until at least 1905.

The mill closed in 1967.

In 1989, the mill opened as part of the Wolcott Mill Metropark.

== Description ==
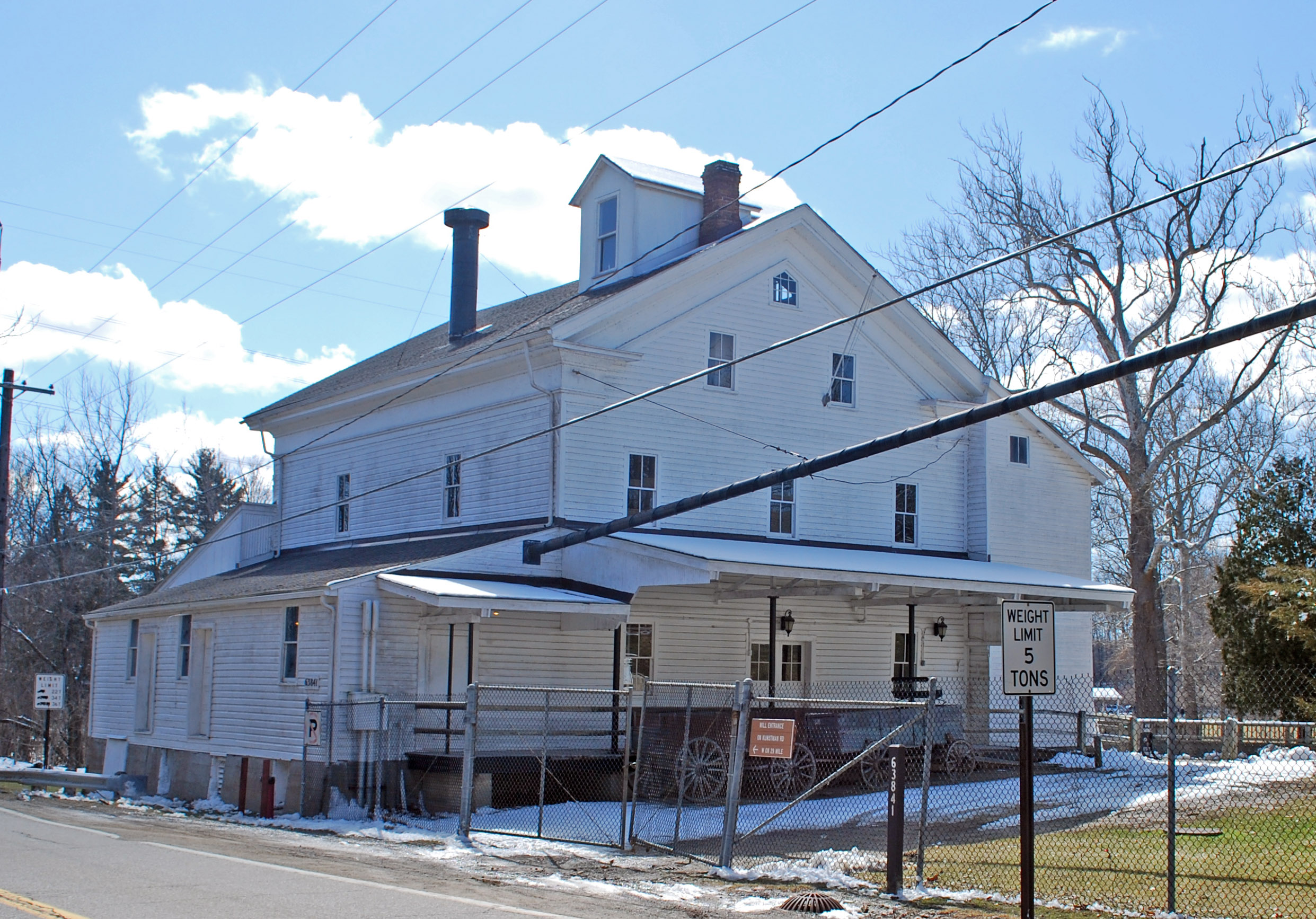

The Wolcott Mill complex includes the mill itself, the millpond, a barn, and a truck garage. A 1950s corncob building is also on the property, and a modern gazebo, restrooms, and toll road building were added by the park system. The large barn was first used as a stable, and was later converted to storage for certified seed. The Metropark uses the barn as a historical museum. The truck garage once housed delivery trucks, and is now used for special events.

The original milling machinery is still in place in the mill. The machinery includes two midget marvel roller mills, used to grind grains, and other machinery used for milling.

== See also ==
- National Register of Historic Places listings in Macomb County, Michigan
