= Mount Clemens Community School District =

School district in Michigan

Address
- 167 Cass Avenue Mount Clemens, Macomb, Michigan, 48043; United States

District information
- Type: Public
- Grades: PreK–12
- Superintendent: Julian Roper, Sr.
- Schools: 3
- Budget: $18,711,000 (2022-2023) expenditures
- NCES District ID: 2624690

Students and staff
- Students: 823 (2024-2025)
- Teachers: 42.4 FTE (2024-2025)
- Staff: 89.37 FTE (2024-2025)
- Student–teacher ratio: 19.41 (2024-2025)

Other information
- Website: www.mtcps.org

Mount Clemens Community Schools is a public school district in Macomb County, Michigan. It serves Mount Clemens and parts of Clinton Township and Harrison Township.

== History ==
A union school district was formed in Mt. Clemens in 1857, a consolidation of the one-room schoolhouse districts in the area. The high school used the 1859 Union School building, at the corner of Grand and Southbound Gratiot. As other schools were built in the city, only the high school was using this building as of 1902. The current Mount Clemens High School was built in 1924.

During the 1999-2000 school year, the district enrolled 3,443 students. Two new elementary schools were constructed with money from a bond passed in 2001. One of those schools, Seminole Academy, remains open, which the other, Martin Luther King Jr. Academy, has closed. The district has 775 students as of the 2023-2024 school year.

== Schools ==
Schools in Mount Clemens Community Schools district
School	Address	Notes
Mount Clemens High School	155 Cass Ave., Mt. Clemens	Grades 9–12. Housed in Mount Clemens Secondary Complex.
Mount Clemens Middle School	155 Cass Ave., Mt.	Grades 6–8. Housed in Mount Clemens Secondary Complex.
Seminole Academy	1500 Mulberry, Mt. Clemens	Grades PreK–5
