= Clinton Township, Macomb County, Michigan =

Clinton Township, Michigan
- Charter township
- Charter Township of Clinton
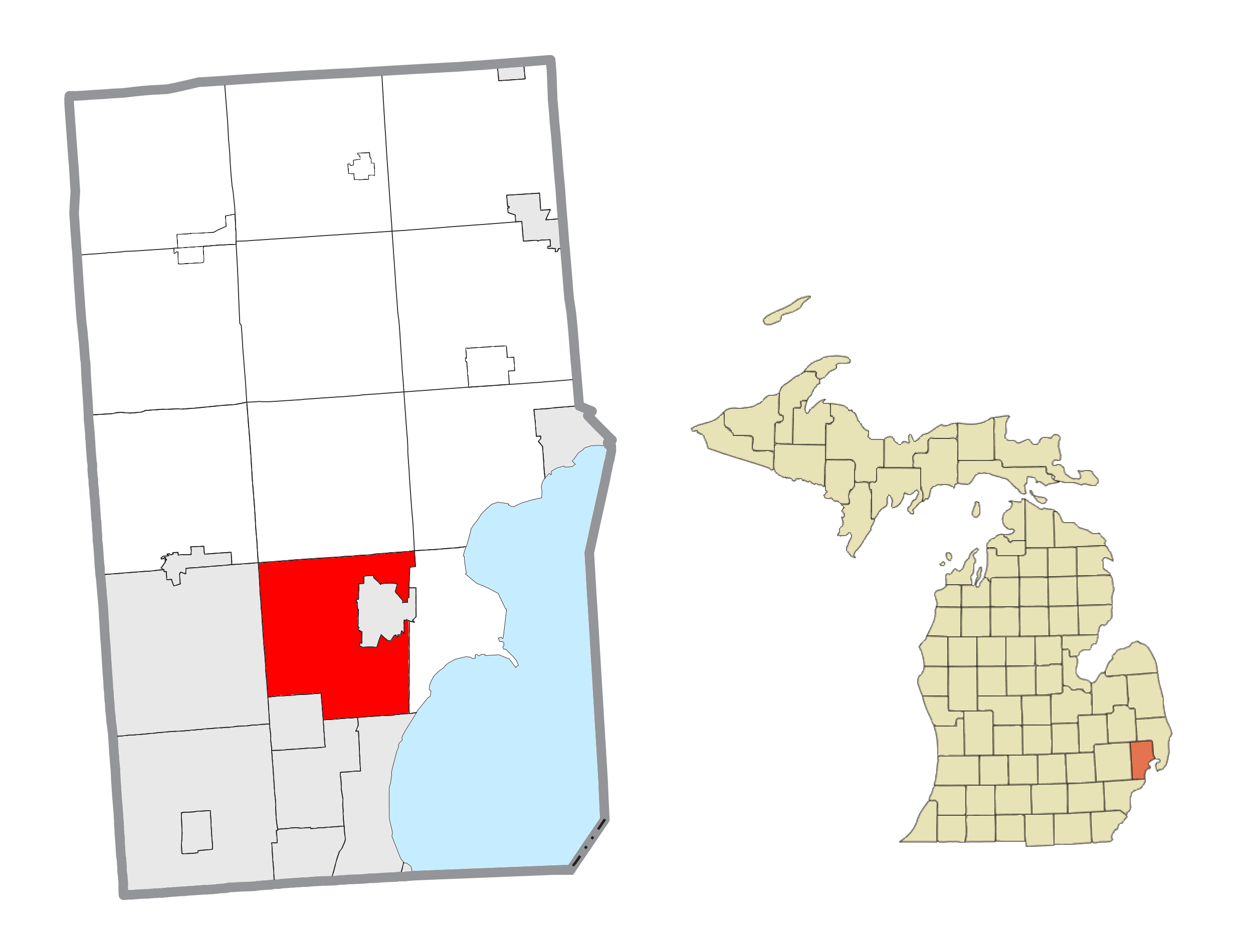
- Location within Macomb County

- Location within Michigan Location within the United States
- Coordinates: 42°35′13″N 82°55′12″W
- Country: United States
- State: Michigan
- County: Macomb
- Settled: 1782
- Organized: 1818
- Chartered: 1989

Government
  - Supervisor: Paul Gieleghem
  - Clerk: Kim Meltzer
  - Treasurer: Mike Aiello
  - Trustees: Julie Matuzak, Dan Kress, Shannon King, Bruce Wade

Area
  - Total: 28.372 sq mi (73.48 km^{2})
  - Land: 28.026 sq mi (72.59 km^{2})
  - Water: 0.346 sq mi (0.90 km^{2})
- Elevation: 876 ft (267 m)

Population (2020)
  - Total: 100,513
  - Density: 3,586.4/sq mi (1,384.7/km^{2})
- Time zone: UTC-5 (Eastern (EST))
  - Summer (DST): UTC-4 (EDT)
- ZIP Codes: 48035, 48036, 48038
- Area code: 586
- FIPS code: 26-16500
- GNIS feature ID: 1626099
- Website: clintontownship.com

Clinton Township is a charter township in Macomb County in the U.S. state of Michigan. A northern suburb of Detroit, Clinton Township is located about 22 miles (35 km) northeast of downtown Detroit. As of the 2020 census, the township had a population of 100,513, making it the most populous township in Michigan, and the state's 8th-most populous community overall.

== History ==
The first settlement on the land that became Clinton Township was called Gnadenhuetten and was established in 1782 by Rev. David Zeisberger, but closed in 1786. It was organized as "Huron Township" on August 12, 1818, named after what was then known as the Huron River. Because of confusion with another Huron River south of Detroit, on July 17, 1824, the Michigan Territorial Legislature renamed both the township and the river after DeWitt Clinton, the popular governor of New York from 1817 to 1823 who was largely responsible for building the Erie Canal which enabled many settlers to come to Michigan.

Moravian Drive is the township's oldest road, dating back to the days when Moravian missionaries settled to attempt to convert the local Native Americans.

== Geography ==
Clinton Township is in south-central Macomb County. The city of Mount Clemens, the Macomb county seat, is bordered on three sides by the northeast part of the township.

According to the United States Census Bureau, Clinton Township has a total area of 28.37 square miles (73.5 km^{2}), of which 28.03 square miles (72.6 km^{2}) are land and 0.35 square miles (0.91 km^{2}), or 1.22%, are water. The Clinton River, for which the community is named, is formed from three branches within the township. It runs east into Harrison Township, where it flows into Lake St. Clair. The township is home to many parks, notably George George Memorial Park.

== Communities ==
There are two unincorporated communities in the township:

- Broad Acres is located in the southeastern portion on M-3/Gratiot Avenue between 15 Mile and Quinn Roads (42°32′57″N 82°54′08″W; Elevation: 610 ft./186 m.).
- Cady is located in the southwestern portion at Utica and Moravian Roads (42°33′37″N 82°57′52″W; Elevation: 614 ft./187 m.). It was founded in 1833 by Chauncey G. Cady. Cady served for a time as township supervisor and was also a member of the state legislature. It had a post office from 1864 until 1906.

== Demographics ==
Historical population
Census	Pop.	Note	%±
2000	95,648		—
2010	96,796		1.2%
2020	100,513		3.8%
2023 (est.)	99,377		−1.1%
U.S. Decennial Census

=== 2020 ===
Clinton charter township, Macomb County, Michigan – Racial and ethnic composition Note: the US Census treats Hispanic/Latino as an ethnic category. This table excludes Latinos from the racial categories and assigns them to a separate category. Hispanics/Latinos may be of any race.
Race / Ethnicity (NH = Non-Hispanic)	Pop 2000	Pop 2010	Pop 2020	% 2000	% 2010	% 2020
White alone (NH)	86,042	78,062	72,926	89.96%	80.65%	72.55%
Black or African American alone (NH)	4,424	12,509	17,428	4.63%	12.92%	17.34%
Native American or Alaska Native alone (NH)	223	230	192	0.23%	0.24%	0.19%
Asian alone (NH)	1,597	1,723	2,170	1.67%	1.78%	2.16%
Pacific Islander alone (NH)	11	29	19	0.01%	0.03%	0.02%
Other race alone (NH)	82	82	335	0.09%	0.08%	0.33%
Mixed race or Multiracial (NH)	1,605	1,871	4,449	1.68%	1.93%	4.43%
Hispanic or Latino (any race)	1,664	2,290	2,994	1.74%	2.37%	2.98%
Total	95,648	96,796	100,513	100.00%	100.00%	100.00%

=== 2010 ===
As of the census of 2010, there were 96,796 people, 42,036 households, and 25,678 families residing in the township. The racial makeup of the township was 82.08% White, 13.04% African American, 0.28% Native American, 1.79% Asian, 0.03% Pacific Islander, 0.61% from other races, and 2.17% from two or more races. Hispanic or Latino people of any race were 2.37% of the population. By 2016, the township's population was estimated to have surpassed 100,000.

In 2000, there were 40,299 households, out of which 28.1% had children under the age of 18 living with them, 48.7% were married couples living together, 10.9% had a female householder with no husband present, and 36.6% were non-families. 30.8% of all households were made up of individuals, and 10.8% had someone living alone who was 65 years of age or older. The average household size was 2.35, and the average family size was 2.98.

In 2000, 22.4% of the population was under the age of 18, 9.1% from 18 to 24, 30.9% from 25 to 44, 23.4% from 45 to 64, and 14.3% who were 65 years of age or older. The median age was 37 years. For every 100 females, there were 92.4 males. For every 100 females age 18 and over, there were 88.5 males. The median income for a household in the township was $50,067, and the median income for a family was $61,497. Males had a median income of $48,818 versus $29,847 for females. The per capita income for the township was $25,758. About 4.2% of families and 5.8% of the population were below the poverty line, including 7.4% of those under age 18 and 6.8% of those age 65 or over.

== Culture ==
The Italian American Cultural Society (IACS) is located in Clinton Township. The IACS building is located on Romeo Plank Road, north of 19 Mile, situated on the northern edge of the township. It is in proximity to the former ex-Partridge Creek clubhouse. In 2004, the center moved to its current location from Warren.

Residents are served by the Clinton-Macomb Public Library.

== Education ==
Chippewa Valley High School

Chippewa Valley Schools, with two high schools (Chippewa Valley and Dakota), and Clintondale Community Schools, with one high school (Clintondale High), are the primary school districts in the township. Other school districts that operate within Clinton Township are L'Anse Creuse, Fraser, and Mount Clemens. The largest school is East Kentwood High School in Kentwood, Michigan, with a total of around 2900 students as of 2026.

== Media ==
The Macomb Daily is headquartered in Clinton Township.

== Notable people ==
- Mark Brewer, chair of the Michigan Democratic Party
- Kyle Connor, hockey player for the Winnipeg Jets, was born in Clinton Township.
- Eminem resides in Clinton Township.
- Jason Hedlesky, racing driver, born in Clinton Township
- J Dilla lived in Clinton Township for a period of time until his death in 2006.
- Andrea Shaw, three-time Ms. Olympia, resides in Clinton Township.
