= Chippewa Valley Schools =

School district in Michigan

Address
- 19120 Cass Avenue Clinton Township, Macomb County, Michigan, 48038; United States
- Coordinates: 42°36′33″N 82°55′40″W

District information
- Grades: PreKindergarten–12
- Established: 1959; 67 years ago
- President: Kenneth Pearl
- Superintendent: Ronald Roberts
- Business administrator: Scott Sederlund
- Schools: 20
- Budget: $237,903,000 2022–2023 expenditures
- NCES District ID: 2609570

Students and staff
- Students: 14,276 (2024–2025)
- Teachers: 773.96 (on an FTE basis) (2024–2025)
- Staff: 124.3 FTE (2024–2025)
- Student–teacher ratio: 18.45 (2024–2025)
- Athletic conference: Macomb Area Conference

Other information
- Website: www.chippewavalleyschools.org

Chippewa Valley High School

Chippewa Valley Schools is a public school district in Metro Detroit. It serves parts of Clinton Township and Macomb Township. The district encompasses over 27 square miles. The school district was formed in 1959 through the consolidation of six existing school districts.

== Schools ==
Chippewa Valley Schools operates 20 schools, including three high schools, four middle schools, twelve elementary schools and one preschool. The district also contains the International Academy of Macomb, which offers the International Baccalaureate program for qualifying students in Macomb County. Adult education is offered at Mohegan High School. Little Turtle Early Childhood Center, at 50375 Card Road in Macomb Township, houses programs for infants, toddlers, and preschoolers.

The two main high schools—Chippewa Valley and Dakota—have designated ninth grade centers, which are buildings only occupied by freshmen.

Virtually all of the district's schools are named after Native American tribes or people. Some have been criticized, including Chippewa Valley High School and 34 other high schools in Michigan, for their use of Native American symbols in their mascots and nicknames.

Schools in Chippewa Valley Schools district
School	Address	Built
High schools (Grades 9–12)
Chippewa Valley High School	18300 19 Mile Road, Clinton Township	1977
Dakota High School	21051 21 Mile Road, Macomb Township	1995
Mohegan High School	19230 Cass, Clinton Township	
International Academy of Macomb	42755 Romeo Plank Road, Clinton Township	
Middle schools (Grades 6–8)
Algonquin Middle School	19150 Briarwood Lane, Clinton Township	1970
Iroquois Middle School	48301 Romeo Plank Road, Macomb Township	1981
Seneca Middle School	47200 Heydenreich Road, Macomb Township	2008
Wyandot Middle School	39490 Garfield Road, Clinton Township	1974
Elementary schools (Grades K–5)
Cherokee Elementary School	42900 Rivergate Drive, Clinton Township	1994
Cheyenne Elementary School	47600 Heydenreich Road, Macomb Township	2000
Clinton Valley Elementary School	1260 Mulberry Street, Mount Clemens	1954
Erie Elementary School	42276 Romeo Plank Road, Clinton Township	1987
Fox Elementary School	17500 Millstone Road, Macomb Township	1980
Huron Elementary School	15800 Terra Bella Street, Clinton Township	1973
Miami Elementary School	41290 Kentvale Drive, Clinton Township	1976
Mohawk Elementary School	48101 Romeo Plank Road, Macomb Township	1986
Ojibwa Elementary School	46950 Heydenreich Road, Macomb Township	1961
Ottawa Elementary School	18601 Millar Road, Clinton Township	1968
Sequoyah Elementary School	18500 24 Mile Road, Macomb Township	2006
Shawnee Elementary School	21555 Vesper Drive, Macomb Township	2002

== See also ==
- List of school districts in Michigan
