= Wally Chambers =

American football player (1951–2019)

No. 60
- Positions: Defensive tackle, defensive end

Personal information
- Born: May 15, 1951; Phenix City, Alabama, U.S.
- Died: September 22, 2019 (aged 68); Saginaw, Michigan, U.S.
- Listed height: 6 ft 6 in (1.98 m)
- Listed weight: 250 lb (113 kg)

Career information
- High school: Mount Clemens (Mount Clemens, Michigan)
- College: Eastern Kentucky
- NFL draft: 1973: 1st round, 8th overall pick

Career history

Playing
- Chicago Bears (1973–1977); Tampa Bay Buccaneers (1978–1979)

Coaching
- Northern Iowa Defensive line coach; East Carolina Defensive line coach; New York Jets (1989) Defensive line coach; Ohio Glory (1992) Defensive line coach; Lackawanna (1993) Head coach

Awards and highlights
- NFL Defensive Rookie of the Year (1973); First-team All-Pro (1976); 2× Second-team All-Pro (1974–1975); 3× Pro Bowl (1973, 1975–1976); 100 greatest Bears of All-Time; Second-team All-American (1972)

Career NFL statistics
- fumble recoveries: 3
- Interceptions: 1
- Stats at Pro Football Reference

Wallace Hashim Chambers (May 15, 1951 – September 22, 2019) was an American professional football player who was a defensive lineman in the National Football League (NFL). He was a defensive tackle for the Chicago Bears and defensive end for the Tampa Bay Buccaneers in the 1970s. He was selected with the eighth overall pick by the Bears in the 1973 NFL draft out of Eastern Kentucky University. He played previous to that for Mount Clemens High School, where he graduated in 1969.

== College ==
Chambers attended Eastern Kentucky University. Chambers led the team in tackles for three straight seasons and was named the MVP of the team in his senior year. In addition to being a first-team All-OVC selection in 1972, his number 78 jersey was retired to go along with being inducted into the Athletic Hall of Fame in 2006.

== Professional career ==
Chambers was chosen as the NFL Defensive Rookie of the Year following the 1973 NFL season and was selected to play in the Pro Bowl three times (1973, 1975 and 1976). Defensive line coach Brad Ecklund once called him "the best player on the field" at times and thought he could be a superstar provided he stayed in the league. Chambers was named All-Pro following the 1976 campaign, 1976 NFL linemen of the year, NFC defensive player of the year (1975 and 1976) and also garnered second-team All-Pro honors in 1973, 1974 and 1975.

Chambers suffered his most serious injury during the 1977 Pro Bowl when he banged his knee during contact. It led to the cartilage under his kneecap decomposing that saw him suffer “traumatic arthritis”. He played just four games in the 1977 season that saw discontent grow between him and management (leading to him filing a grievance to the Player‐Club Relations Committee due to the refusal rights the Bears had on him) that would see him traded to Tampa Bay on April 12, 1978, for a first round draft pick. After playing in Tampa Bay, he retired from the league at the age of 28 in 1979. Chambers was named the 58th best player in Bears history upon the centennial anniversary of the Bears in 2019.

== Coaching career ==
Following his playing career Chambers coached at the University of Northern Iowa, at East Carolina University, and for the New York Jets.

In 1989 Chambers was a defensive coach for the New York Jets under Joe Walton. He then served as the defensive line coach for the WLAF's Ohio Glory in their sole season in 1992 under head coach Larry Little.

== Personal life ==
Chambers had trouble standing up during the last 10 years of his life due to knee and back problems and spent a great deal of his time in a wheel chair or using a walker. He lived in Saginaw, Michigan, with his wife Patsy Chambers.

Chambers died on September 22, 2019, at the age of 68.

== Head coaching record ==
Year	Team	Overall	Conference	Standing	Bowl/playoffs
Lackawanna Falcons (Independent) (1993)
1993	Lackawanna	4–4–1			
Lackawanna:		4–4–1			
Total:		4–4–1			

Awards
Preceded by Jack Youngblood	UPI NFC Defensive Player of the Year; 1976	Succeeded by Harvey Martin
