= Macomb Township, Michigan =

- Civil township
- Township of Macomb
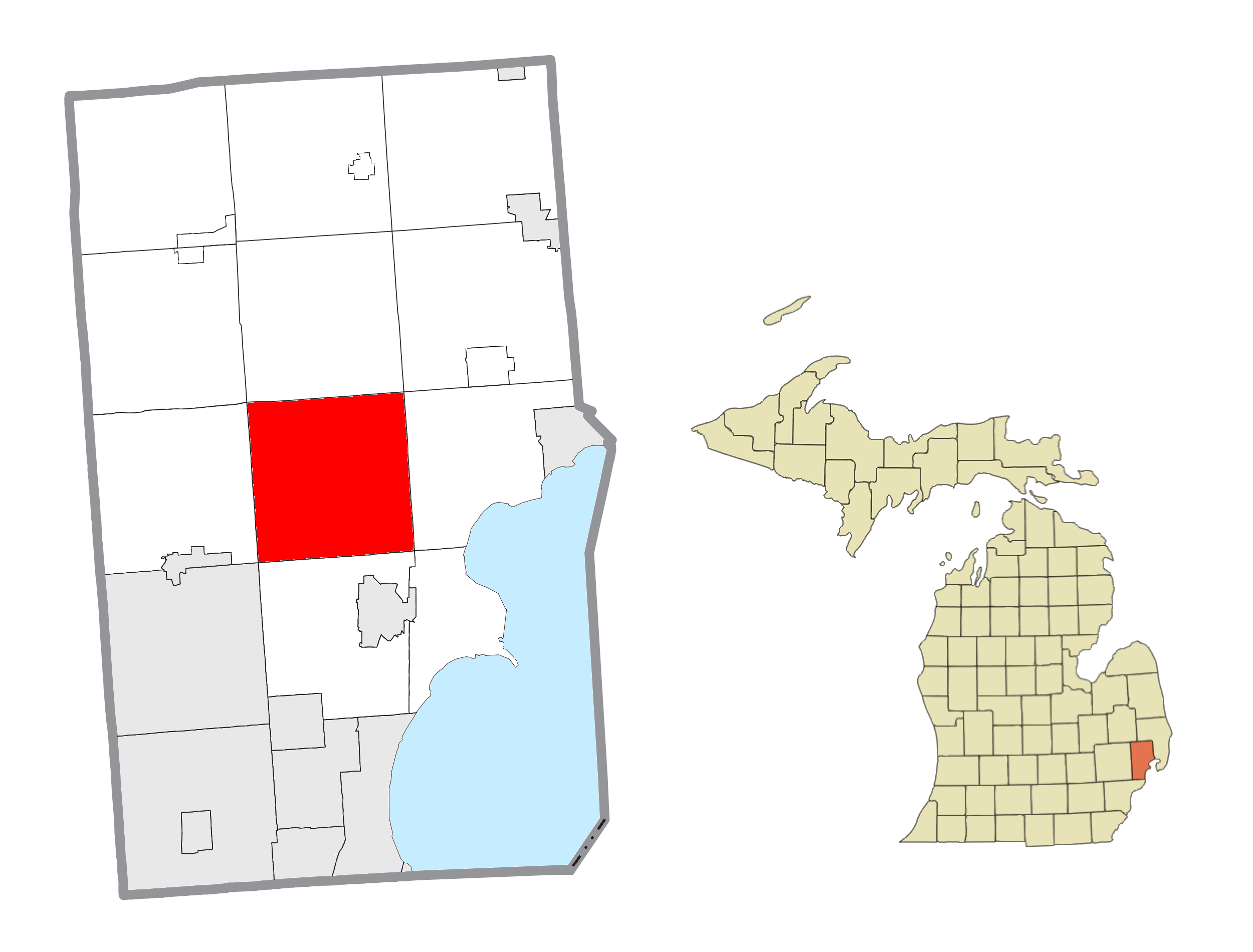
- Location within Macomb County

- Location within Michigan Location within the United States
- Coordinates: 42°39′33″N 82°55′51″W
- Country: United States
- State: Michigan
- County: Macomb
- Established: 1834

Government
  - Supervisor: Frank Viviano
  - Clerk: Kristi Pozzi
  - Treasurer: Leon Drolet
  - Trustees: Frank Cusamano, Peter Lucido, Charles Oliver, Ronald Papa Jr.

Area
  - Total: 36.35 sq mi (94.1 km^{2})
  - Land: 36.25 sq mi (93.9 km^{2})
  - Water: 0.09 sq mi (0.23 km^{2})
- Elevation: 604 ft (184 m)

Population (2020)
  - Total: 91,663
  - Density: 2,528.5/sq mi (976.3/km^{2})
- Time zone: UTC-5 (Eastern (EST))
  - Summer (DST): UTC-4 (EDT)
- ZIP Codes: 48042, 48044 (Macomb)
- Area code: 586
- FIPS code: 26-50480
- GNIS feature ID: 1626660
- Website: www.macomb-mi.gov

Macomb Township is a civil township of Macomb County in the U.S. state of Michigan. The population was 91,663 at the 2020 census, up from 79,580 in 2010. As of 2020 it was the most-populous civil township in the state and the third most-populous township overall after the charter townships of Clinton and Canton.

== History ==
The founders of Macomb Township arrived in the early 19th century in search of flat and fertile farmland, like that near the Clinton River. Many of these early settlers were of German descent, and the German influences remain today. The Township of Macomb was officially approved by the Legislative Council on March 7, 1834.

The township was named in honor of General Alexander Macomb, who was a highly decorated veteran of the War of 1812; his successful mercantile family owned most of Macomb County at one time.

Macomb Township was a large part of the lumber and logging industry of southeast Michigan in the late 19th century and early 20th century. Logs would be transported south from Wolcott Mill in Ray Township, down the Middle Branch of the Clinton River to sawmills. Romeo Plank Road is a historic route that follows the river on its western side.

Macomb Township experienced significant growth during the period of 2000–2008, boasting a 48% increase in population.

== Geography ==
Macomb Township is at the geographic center of Macomb County. Mount Clemens, the county seat, is 7 miles (11 km) to the south, and downtown Detroit is 26 miles (42 km) to the south-southwest.

According to the U.S. Census Bureau, the township has a total area of 36.35 square miles (94.15 km^{2}), of which 36.25 square miles (93.89 km^{2}) are land and 0.09 square miles (0.23 km^{2}), or 0.26%, are water.

== Communities ==
- Macomb (or Macomb Corners) is located in the northwest part of the township at 42°42′03″N 82°57′33″W on Romeo Plank Road at 25 Mile Road, near the Middle Branch of the Clinton River.
- Meade is located in the northeast portion of the township at 42°43′03″N 82°52′26″W on the boundary with Ray Township at 26 Mile Road and North Avenue.
- Waldenburg is located in the central portion of the township at 42°39′26″N 82°56′15″W, a few miles south of Macomb Corners on Romeo Plank Road and the Clinton River, chiefly in the 22 Mile Road area.

== Demographics ==
Macomb Township, Michigan – Racial and ethnic composition Note: the US Census treats Hispanic/Latino as an ethnic category. This table excludes Latinos from the racial categories and assigns them to a separate category. Hispanics/Latinos may be of any race.
Race / Ethnicity (NH = Non-Hispanic)	Pop 2000	Pop 2010	Pop 2020	% 2000	% 2010	% 2020
White alone (NH)	47,968	70,906	77,042	95.03%	89.10%	84.05%
Black or African American alone (NH)	420	3,096	4,627	0.83%	3.89%	5.05%
Native American or Alaska Native alone (NH)	88	136	99	0.17%	0.17%	0.11%
Asian alone (NH)	710	2,446	3,198	1.41%	3.07%	3.49%
Pacific Islander alone (NH)	4	15	19	0.01%	0.02%	0.02%
Other race alone (NH)	27	72	216	0.05%	0.09%	0.24%
Mixed race or Multiracial (NH)	526	1,106	3,603	1.04%	1.39%	3.93%
Hispanic or Latino (any race)	735	1,803	2,859	1.46%	2.27%	3.12%
Total	50,478	79,580	91,663	100.00%	100.00%	100.00%

As of the census of 2010, there were 79,580 people and 27,585 households in the township. The population density was 2,196.8 inhabitants per square mile (848.2/km^{2}). There were 27,585 housing units. The racial makeup of the township was 90.5% White, 3.9% African American, 0.2% Native American, 3.1% Asian, 0.0% Pacific Islander, 0.7% from other races, and 1.6% from two or more races. Hispanic or Latino of any race were 2.3% of the population.

As of the census of 2000, there were 50,478 people, 16,946 households, and 14,065 families residing in the township. The population density was 1,391.7 inhabitants per square mile (537.3/km^{2}). There were 17,922 housing units at an average density of 494.1 per square mile (190.8/km^{2}). The racial makeup of the township was 96.12% White, 0.84% African American, 0.19% Native American, 1.41% Asian, 0.01% Pacific Islander, 0.31% from other races, and 1.12% from two or more races. Hispanic or Latino of any race were 1.46% of the population.

There were 16,946 households, out of which 45.3% had children under the age of 18 living with them, 73.7% were married couples living together, 6.5% had a female householder with no husband present, and 17.0% were non-families. 13.7% of all households were made up of individuals, and 3.9% had someone living alone who was 65 years of age or older. The average household size was 2.97 and the average family size was 3.30.

In the township the population was spread out, with 30.2% under the age of 18, 6.9% from 18 to 24, 35.1% from 25 to 44, 20.3% from 45 to 64, and 7.4% who were 65 years of age or older. The median age was 34 years. For every 100 females, there were 99.6 males. For every 100 females age 18 and over, there were 97.3 males.

== Education ==
The public school districts that serve residents of Macomb Township are Chippewa Valley Schools, L'Anse Creuse Public Schools, New Haven Community Schools and Utica Community Schools. For public library services, the Township is served by the Clinton-Macomb Public Library district.

== Media ==
The township's flagship newspaper is the Macomb Township Chronicle.

== Sports ==
Home to the semipro Blue Water Stars of the Michigan Independence Hockey League(MIHL).

== Notable people ==
- Jayson Blair, actor
- Matt Busch, filmmaker and Star Wars artist
- Danny DeKeyser, professional hockey player for the Detroit Red Wings
- Marisa DiGrande, soccer player
- Mario Impemba, sportscaster, former television broadcaster of the Detroit Tigers
- Masiela Lusha, actress and writer
- Jeff Smith, racing driver
- Ryan Rollins, professional basketball player
- Natalie Viggiano, professional soccer player
- Kat Timpf, columnist, author and television personality
