= Grosse Pointe =

Region of the Detroit metropolitan area

- Metro Detroit
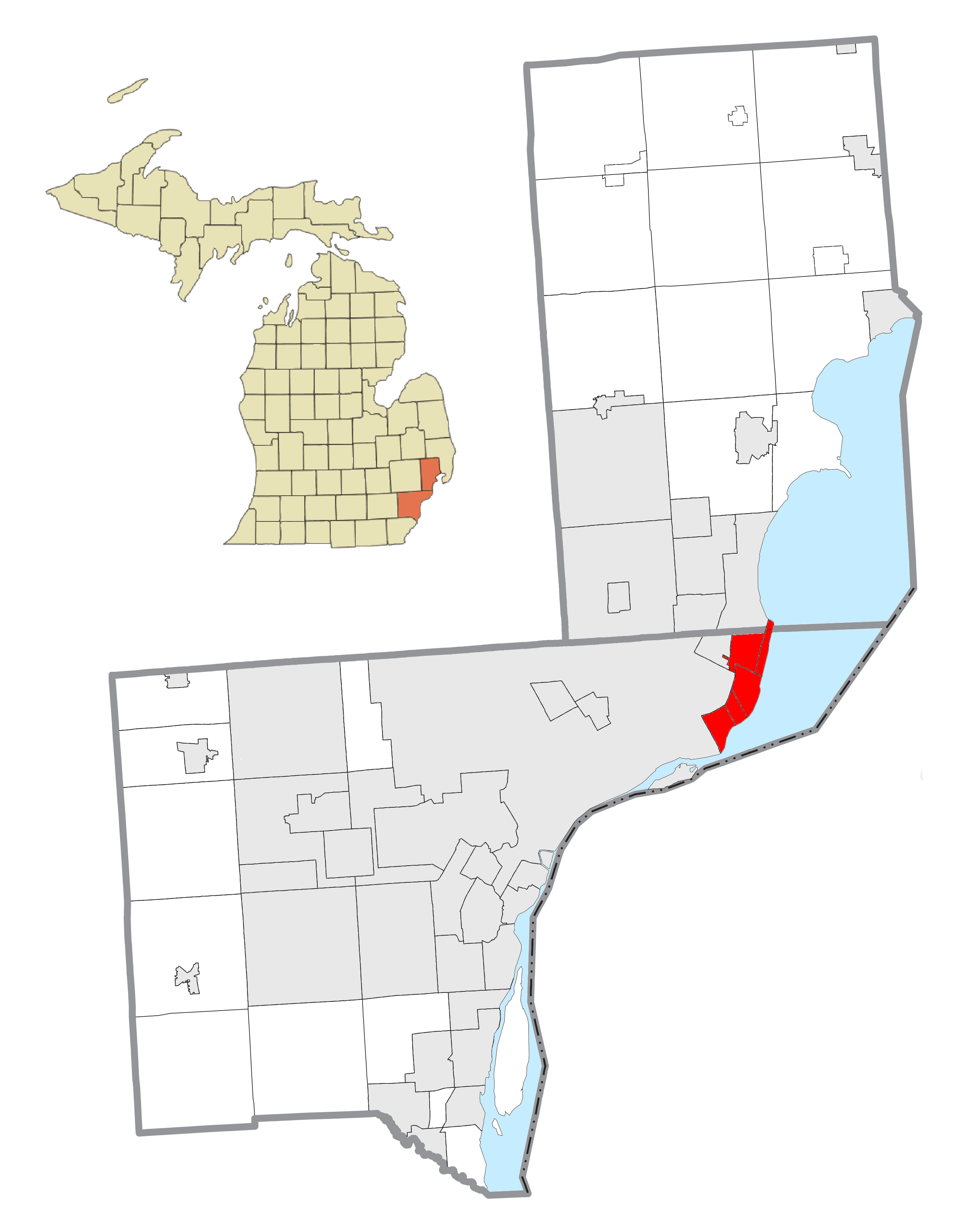
- Cities that are included as part of the Grosse Pointe area within Wayne County (bottom) and Macomb County (top)

- Location within the state of Michigan
- Coordinates: 42°23′48″N 82°54′23″W
- Country: United States
- State: Michigan
- Counties: Macomb and Wayne
- Cities: Grosse Pointe; Grosse Pointe Farms; Grosse Pointe Park; Grosse Pointe Shores; Grosse Pointe Woods

Area
  - Total: 40.78 sq mi (105.6 km^{2})
  - Land: 10.38 sq mi (26.9 km^{2})
  - Water: 30.40 sq mi (78.7 km^{2})

Population (2010)
  - Total: 45,598
  - Density: 4,392.9/sq mi (1,696.1/km^{2})
- Time zone: UTC-5 (EST)
  - Summer (DST): UTC-4 (EDT)
- Zip code(s): 48230, 48236
- Area code: 313

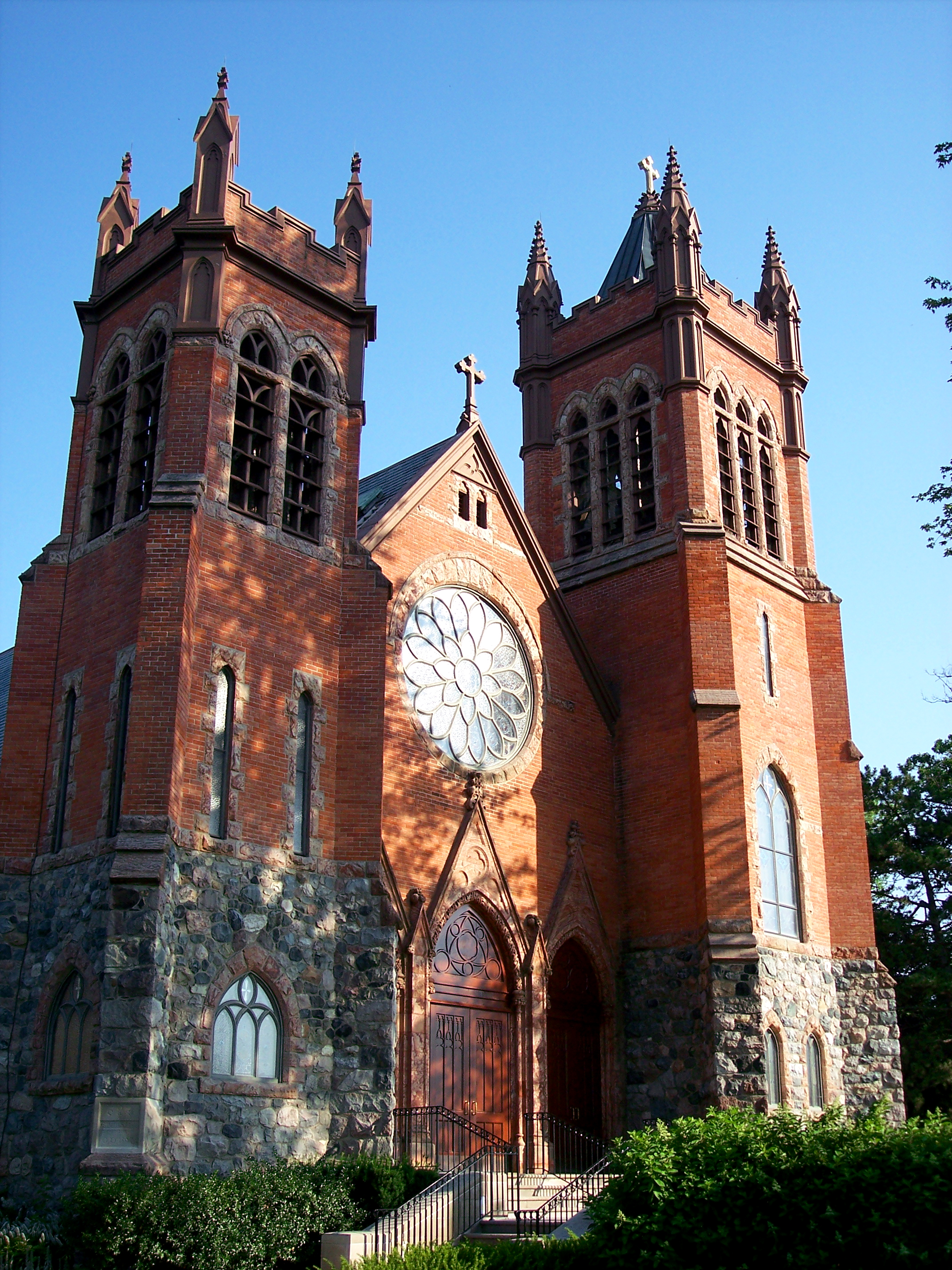
St. Paul Catholic Church at 157 Lake Shore in Grosse Pointe Farms. The current French Gothic Revival structure was constructed in 1899 and designed by Harry J. Rill.

Grosse Pointe (commonly known as the Pointes) is a group of five adjacent suburbs in the Detroit metropolitan area on the shore of Lake St. Clair, immediately east of the city of Detroit. It includes the cities of Grosse Pointe Park, Grosse Pointe, Grosse Pointe Farms, Grosse Pointe Shores, and Grosse Pointe Woods.

The terms "Grosse Pointe" or "the Pointes" are ordinarily used to refer to the group of five communities, which have a total population of about 46,000. The Grosse Pointes altogether are 10.4 square miles, bordered by Detroit on the south and west, Lake St. Clair on the east and south, Harper Woods (in Wayne County) on the west of some portions, and St. Clair Shores on the north. The cities are in eastern Wayne County, except for a very small section in Macomb County. The Pointes begin six miles (9.7 km) northeast of downtown Detroit and extend several miles northeastward, in a narrow swath of land, to the edge of Wayne County. The name "Grosse Pointe" alludes to the size of the area, and its projection into Lake St. Clair.

Grosse Pointe is a suburban area in Metro Detroit, sharing a border with northeast Detroit's historic neighborhoods. Grosse Pointe has many famous historic estates along with remodeled homes and newer construction. Downtown Grosse Pointe, along Kercheval Avenue from Neff to Cadieux, nicknamed "The Village," serves as a central business district for all five of the Grosse Pointes, although each of them (except Grosse Pointe Shores) has several blocks of retail. Downtown Detroit is just over seven miles (11 km) west of this downtown area, accessed by Jefferson Avenue, or several other cross-streets.

The north–south area along Lake St. Clair generally coincides with the boundaries of the two public high schools. The southern areas (basically south and west of Moross Road) feature retail districts.

== History ==
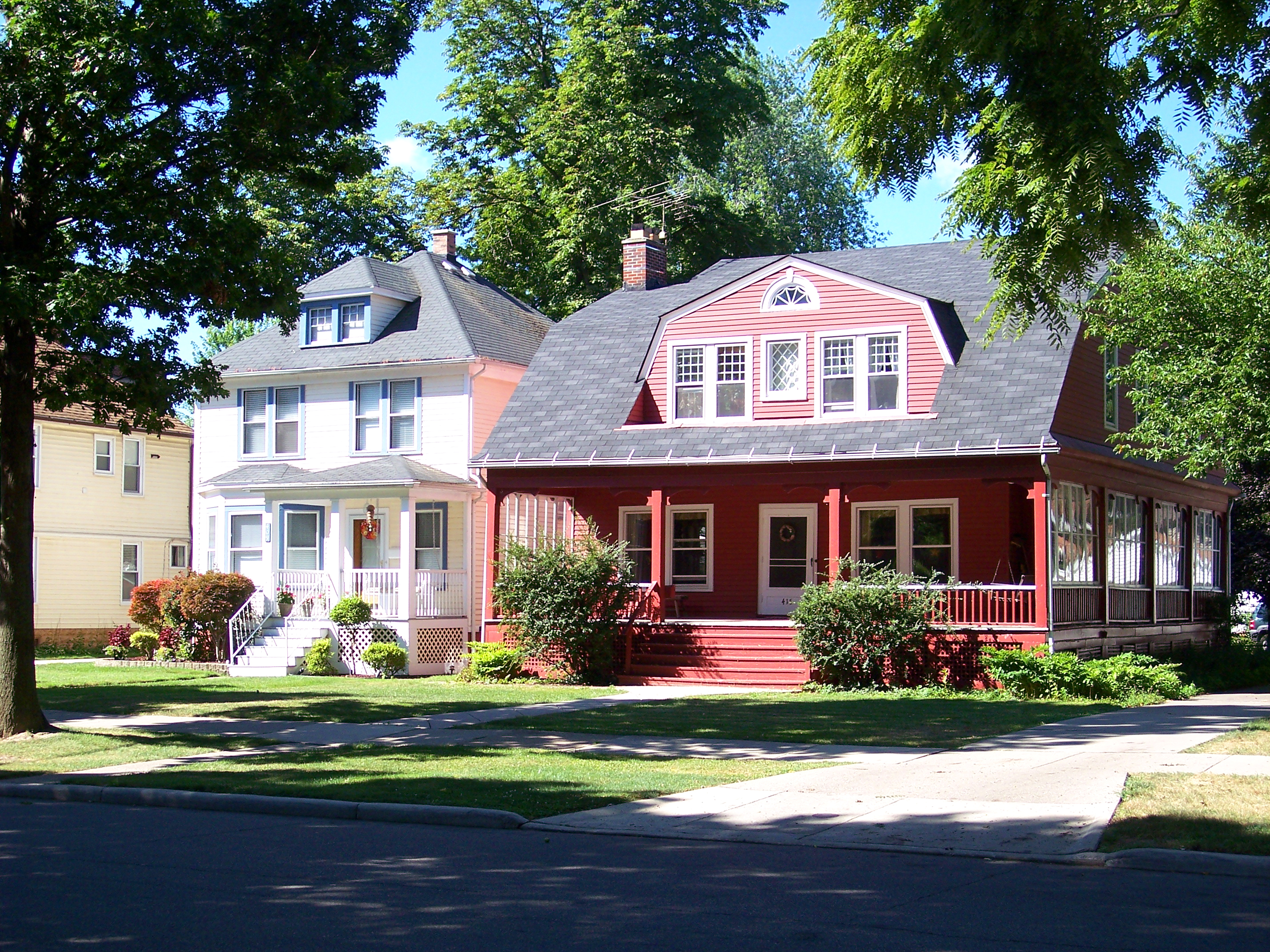
Some of the historic homes that can be found in The City of Grosse Pointe

Historical population
Census	Pop.	Note	%±
1900	1,160		—
1910	1,982		70.9%
1920	5,088		156.7%
1930	21,462		321.8%
1940	29,648		38.1%
1950	40,181		35.5%
1960	55,141		37.2%
1970	58,899		6.8%
1980	52,022		−11.7%
1990	49,300		−5.2%
2000	47,780		−3.1%
2010	45,598		−4.6%

Grosse Pointe, recognized for its historic reputation for scenery and landscape, has grown from a colonial outpost and a fertile area for small orchard owners and farmers to a coastal community with prime real estate chosen for grand estates.

The Grosse Pointes were first settled by French farmers in the 1750s after the establishment of the French Fort Pontchartrain. Members of the British Empire began arriving around the time of the Revolutionary War. The first notable resident was Commodore Alexander Grant, a Royal naval officer and acting lieutenant governor of Upper Canada (now Ontario). Grant built Castle Grant, the area's first mansion in the late 18th century. In the 19th century, Grosse Pointe continued to be the site of lakefront ribbon farms: long narrow farms that each adjoin the lake, useful for irrigation and early transportation needs. Beginning in the 1850s, wealthy residents of Detroit began building second homes in the Grosse Pointe area, and soon afterward, hunting, fishing, and golf clubs appeared. Some grand estates arose in the late 19th century, and with the dawn of the automobile after 1900, Grosse Pointe became a preferred suburb for business executives in addition to a retreat for wealthy Detroiters. By the 1930s, most of the southern and western areas of Grosse Pointe contained established neighborhoods, with remaining gaps and the northern sections such as Grosse Pointe Woods developing after the 1930s.

In 1960, it was revealed that realtors in suburban Grosse Pointe ranked prospective home buyers by using a point system with categories such as race, nationality, occupation, and “degree of swarthiness.” Southern Europeans, Jews, and Poles required higher rankings than Northwestern European people in order to move into the community, while Asians and Blacks were excluded from living in Grosse Pointe altogether. Private detectives were used to investigate potential residents’ backgrounds. The revelation of this practice moved the state corporation and securities commissioner to issue a regulation to bar the licensing of real estate brokers who discriminated on the basis of race, religion, or national origin. Public hearings brought the national attention to the real estate discrimination situation in Detroit, which resulted in the expansion of open housing activity in the city.

A passenger rail line that connected Detroit to Mt. Clemens along the shore was operational by the late 1890s, making Grosse Pointe more accessible. As the automobile became the primary method of transportation and the rail line was decommissioned, the vista of what became Lake Shore Drive gradually improved. Lakeside estates are accessed from Lake Shore Drive and Jefferson Avenue.

Over the course of the 20th and 21st centuries, Grosse Pointe has gained a reputation as a notable American suburb; entrepreneurial leadership, recreational activities afforded by the Great Lakes waterway, an international border with Canada, and a focus on quality of education contributed to the successful development of the region. The Russell Alger Jr. House, at 32 Lake Shore Dr., serves as the Grosse Pointe War Memorial community center. Grosse Pointe contains fifteen recognized Michigan historical markers.

== Demographics ==
The Pointes, Michigan – Racial and ethnic composition Note: the US Census treats Hispanic/Latino as an ethnic category. This table excludes Latinos from the racial categories and assigns them to a separate category. Hispanics/Latinos may be of any race.
Race / Ethnicity (NH = Non-Hispanic)	Pop 2000	Pop 2010	Pop 2020	% 2000	% 2010	% 2020
White alone (NH)	42,533	40,746	39,948	94.61%	89.36%	85.81%
Black or African American alone (NH)	572	2,332	2,437	1.27%	5.11%	5.23%
Native American or Alaska Native alone (NH)	66	59	64	0.15%	0.13%	0.14%
Asian alone (NH)	742	908	1,028	1.65%	1.99%	2.21%
Native Hawaiian or Pacific Islander alone (NH)	5	8	8	0.01%	0.02%	0.02%
Other race alone (NH)	38	54	154	0.08%	0.12%	0.33%
Mixed race or Multiracial (NH)	426	588	1,548	0.95%	1.29%	3.33%
Hispanic or Latino (any race)	575	903	1,368	1.28%	1.98%	2.94%
Total	44,957	45,598	46,555	100.00%	100.00%	100.00%

== Culture and contemporary life ==
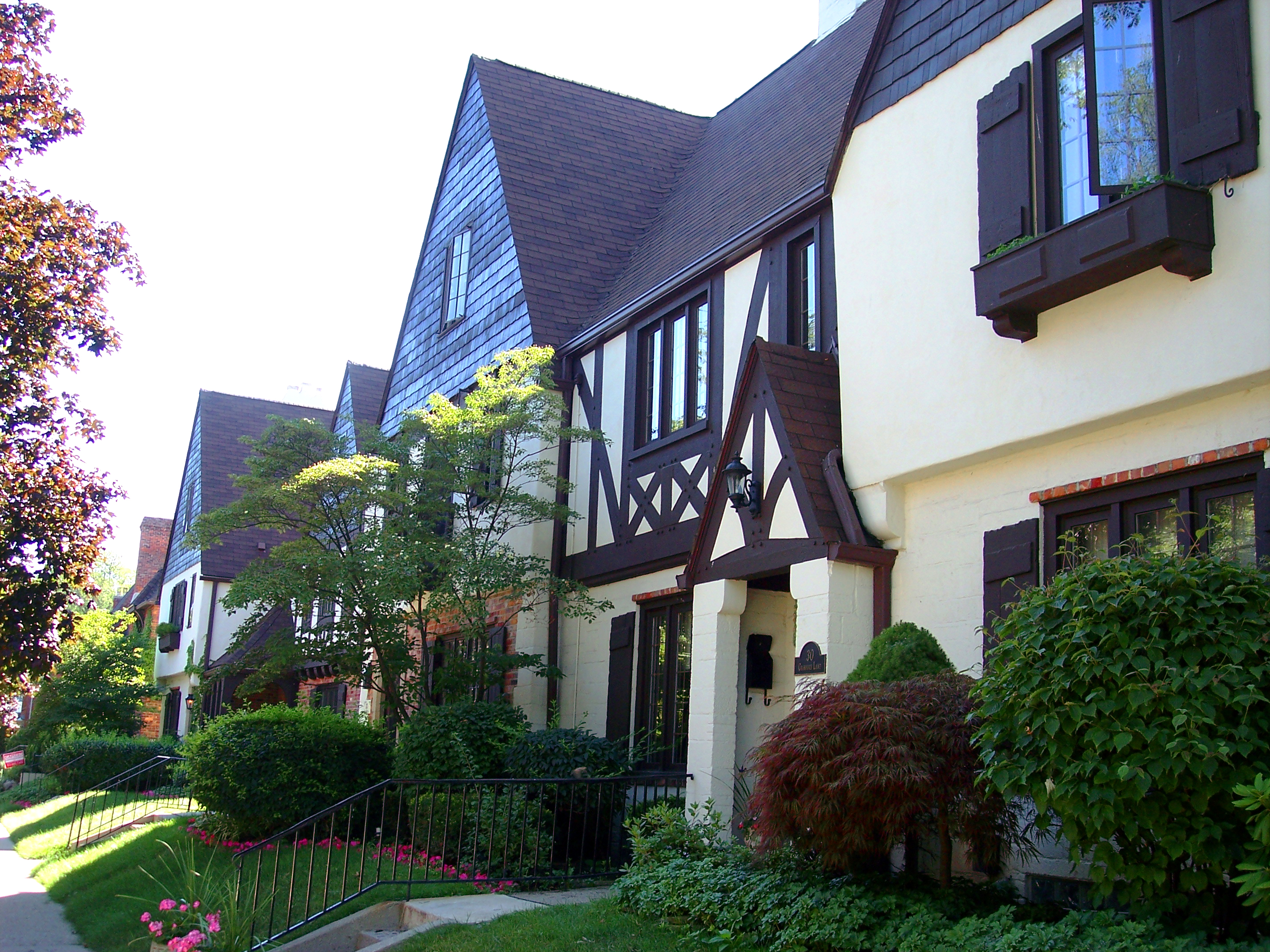
Townhouses in Grosse Pointe.

"The Village", concentrated along Kercheval Avenue in Grosse Pointe, serves as a central business district for the five Pointes with traditional street-side shopping. The Village had its own Sanders Candy and Dessert Shop, founded by Frederick Sanders Schmidt, who opened a store Detroit in 1875; it closed in 2020. The Village has become a vibrant district with the emergence of mixed-use developments. Grosse Pointe Farms is home to "The Hill" district, located on a small bluff, which includes offices, stores, restaurants, and the main branch of the public library. Grosse Pointe Park has retail and restaurants on cross-streets near its "Cabbage Patch" district, and a farmer's market held weekly during the warm months. Grosse Pointe Woods' main business district lies along one of its main roads, Mack Avenue.

The recreational lifestyle historically associated with Grosse Pointe has given rise to many private clubs. The Country Club of Detroit in Grosse Pointe Farms has a golf course, tennis, and traditional amenities. The Grosse Pointe Yacht Club, at the intersection of Vernier Road and Lakeshore Drive on Lake St. Clair, is an acclaimed boating club. The Grosse Pointe Club, also called the "Little Club," is a highly exclusive, historic club on the lakefront, on a site where wealthy Detroiters and Grosse Pointers have gathered for recreation since its organization in 1885, when Grosse Pointe was a cottage-town. The Lochmoor Club in Grosse Pointe has a golf course and other amenities. The Hunt Club, an equestrian club in Grosse Pointe, has horses and stables.

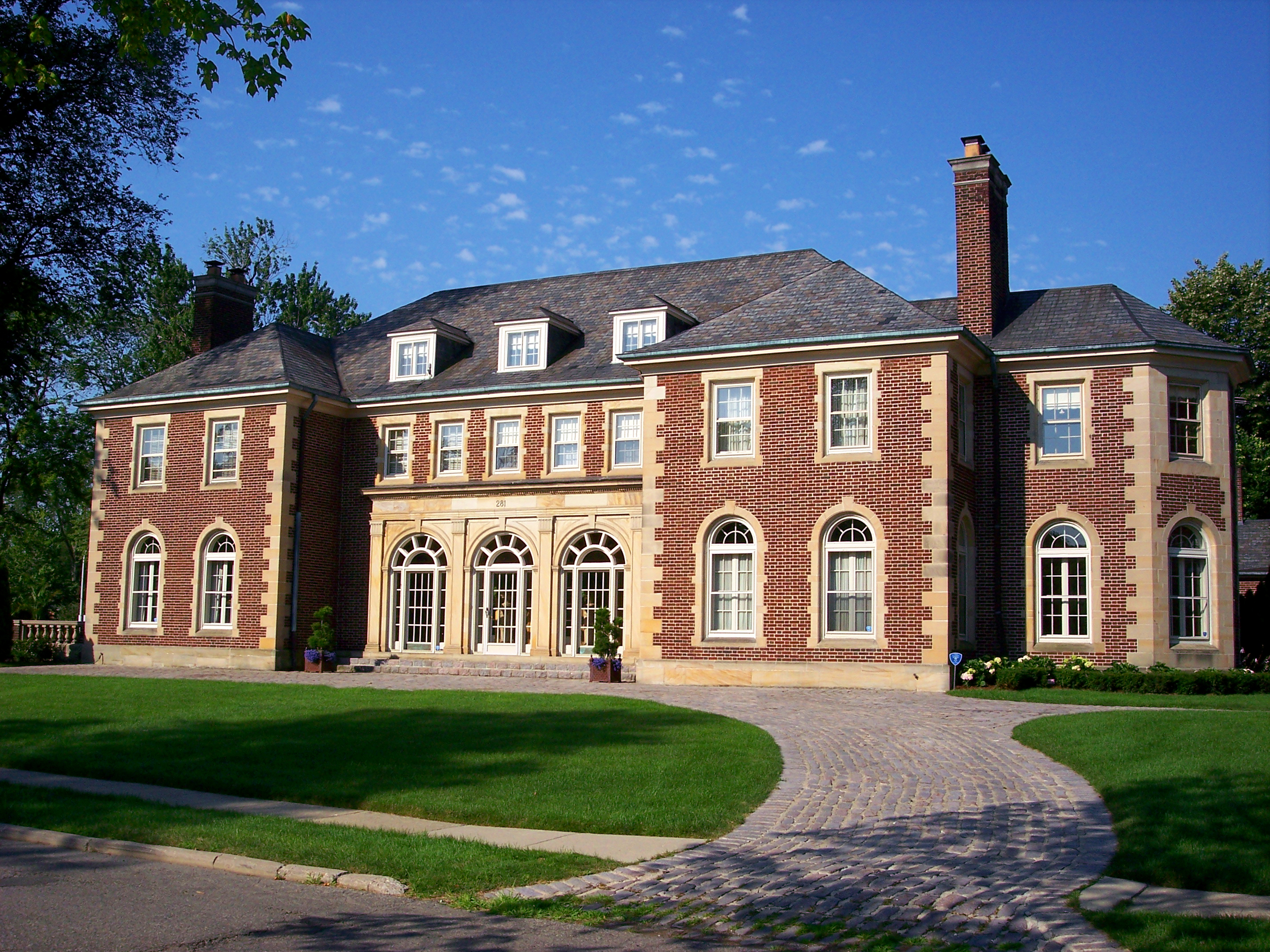
University Place, Georgian mansion in Grosse Pointe.

Many prominent Detroiters have lived in Grosse Pointe, including members of the Ford family, including Edsel Ford (son of Henry Ford) and his wife, Eleanor Clay Ford, and Henry Ford II (grandson of Henry Ford). The Edsel and Eleanor Ford House, at 1100 Lake Shore Drive, is open to the public for guided tours.

Each city has at least one municipal park along Lake St. Clair. The landlocked Grosse Pointe Woods has its park at the southern tip of St. Clair Shores, next to Grosse Pointe Shores. The municipalities bar nonresidents from the parks, drawing occasional dissent from residents of Grosse Pointe and other neighborhoods in Metro Detroit. Jefferson Avenue, a major thoroughfare in Detroit, becomes Lake Shore Drive between Grosse Pointe Farms and Grosse Pointe Shores, and is the scenic carriageway of all five Grosse Pointes, after skirting the eastern neighborhoods of Detroit. Lake Shore Drive was featured on HGTV's television program Dream Drives and in the films Grosse Pointe Blank and Gran Torino.

The region is home to University Liggett School, Michigan's oldest independent school, and two public high schools: Grosse Pointe South High School and Grosse Pointe North High School, which are the termini of the Grosse Pointe Public School System.

Newspapers and community organizations generally serve all five cities, as do the public library and school system, but municipal services are separate. The weekly Grosse Pointe News and the semi-weekly Grosse Pointe Times provide local news, as do the Detroit Free Press and The Detroit News.

== Architecture ==
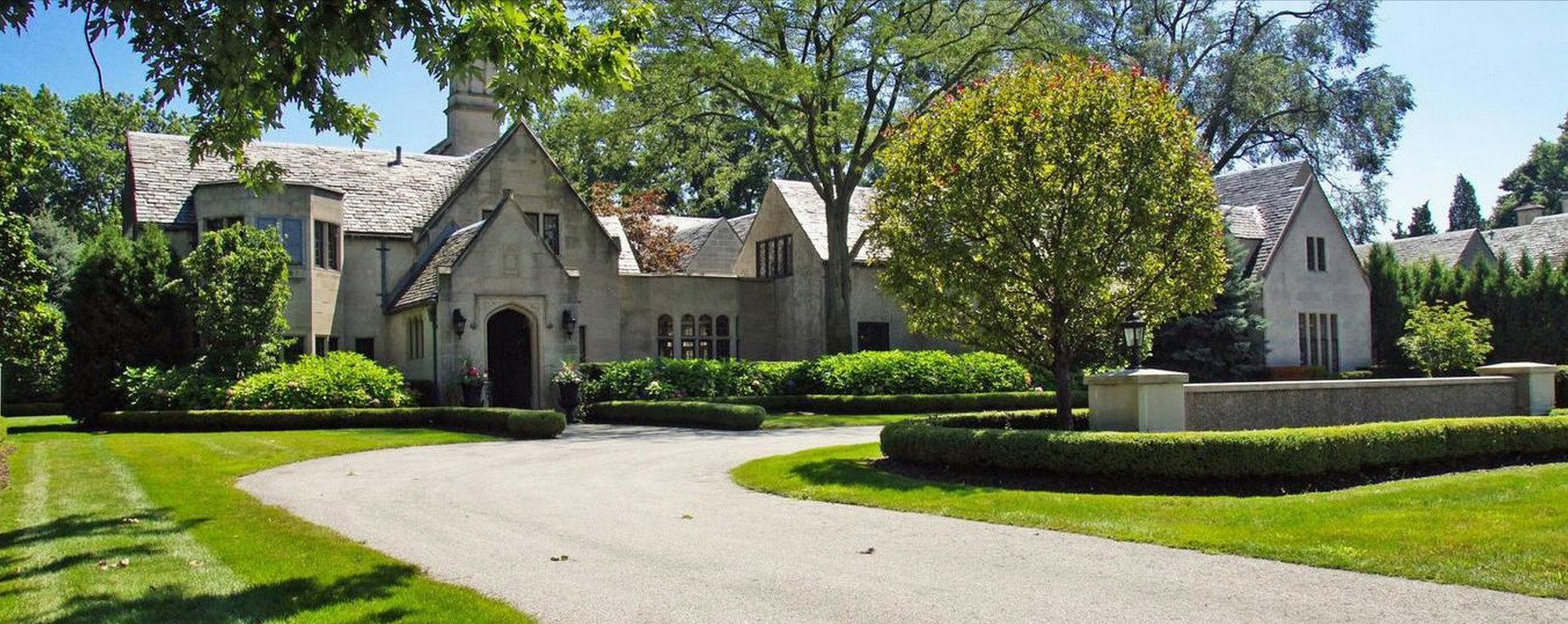
Windmill Point (1925), Tudor Revival mansion by Hugh T. Keyes.

Grosse Pointe has historic architecture and some newer mansions. Albert Kahn designed the Edsel & Eleanor Ford House (1927) at 1100 Lakeshore Dr. in Grosse Pointe. Rose Terrace (1934–1976), the mansion of Anna Thompson Dodge, once stood at 12 Lakeshore Dr. in Grosse Pointe. Designed by Horace Trumbauer as a Louis XV-styled château, Rose Terrace was an enlarged version of the firm's Miramar in Newport, Rhode Island.

A developer bought Rose Terrace and demolished it in 1976 to create an upscale neighborhood, galvanizing local preservationists. The Dodge Art Collection from Rose Terrace is displayed at the Detroit Institute of Arts. The Italian Renaissance styled Russell A. Alger House (1910), at 32 Lake Shore Drive, by architect Charles A. Platt serves as the Grosse Pointe War Memorial.

Many noted architects designed works in Grosse Pointe including Albert Kahn, Marcel Breuer, Marcus Burrowes, Chittendon and Kotting, Crombie & Stanton, Wallace Frost, Robert O. Derrick, John M. Donaldson, Louis Kamper, August Geiger, William Kessler, Hugh T. Keyes, George D. Mason, Charles A. Platt, Leonard Willeke, Eliel and Eero Saarinen, Field, Hinchman, and Smith, William Buck Stratton, and Minoru Yamasaki.

=== Landmarks ===
Name	Image	Year	Location	Style	Architect	Notes
Grosse Pointe Academy		1928	171 Lake Shore Dr. 42°23′35″N 82°53′37″W	Tudor	William Schickel, Magginnis and Walsh	Listed on the National Register of Historic Places. Formerly known as the Academy of the Sacred Heart.
Country Club of Detroit		1927	220 Country Club Dr.	Tudor	SmithGroup	
Russell A. Alger Jr. House		1910	32 Lake Shore Dr. 42°23′13″N 82°53′50″W	Italian Renaissance	Charles A. Platt	Grosse Pointe War Memorial. Listed on the National Register of Historic Places.
Beverly Road Historic District		1911	23-45 Beverly Rd. 42°23′18″N 82°54′6″W	Colonial, Neo-Renaissance, Tudor	Albert Kahn, Robert O. Derrick, Raymond Carey, and Marcus Burrowes, et al.	Listed on the National Register of Historic Places.
Ralph Harmon Booth House		1924	315 Washington Road	Tudor, Jacobean	Marcus Burrowes	Originally home of U.S. Minister to Denmark, Detroit Institute of Arts Philanthropist, and brother of George Gough Booth, 12,000 square feet (1,100 m^{2}).
JP Bowen House		1927	16628 East Jefferson	French colonial	Wallace Frost	A 9,000-square-foot (840 m^{2}) lakefront estate.
Buck-Wardwell House		1840	16109 East Jefferson, at Three Mile	Colonial	William Buck	The oldest extant brick house in Grosse Pointe, a large colonial home.
Christ Church Chapel		1930	61 Grosse Pointe Rd. 42°23′29″N 82°54′3″W	Neo-Gothic	Bertram Grosvenor Goodhue	Listed on the National Register of Historic Places.
Defer Elementary School		1924	15425 Kercheval; 42°23′0.01″N 82°56′6.66″W			Listed on the National Register of Historic Places.
Charles A. Dean House- "Ridgeland"		1924	221 Lewiston.	Mediterranean, Tuscan	Hugh T. Keyes	A 9,000-square-foot (840 m^{2}) hillside estate.
Paul Harvey Deming House "Cherryhurst"		1907	111 Lake Shore Dr. 42°23′30″N 82°53′40″W	Tudor		Listed on the National Register of Historic Places.
C. Goodlee Edgar House		1910	880 Lake Shore Dr.	Colonial Revival	Albert Kahn	
Benson Ford House- "Woodley Green"		1934	635 Lake Shore Dr.	Georgian	Hugh T. Keyes	The house is the former home of Benson Ford, grandson of Henry Ford. Also known as the Emory W. Clark House.
Edsel and Eleanor Ford House		1927	1100 Lakeshore Dr. 42°27′21″N 82°52′26″W	Cotswold	Albert Kahn, Jens Jensen	President of Ford Motor Company, son of Henry Ford, the 20,000-square-foot (1,900 m^{2}) estate is open to the public for guided tours. Listed on the National Register of Historic Places, located in Macomb County.
Henry Ford II House		1957	160 Provencal Rd.	Georgian		The mansion has 9,723-square-foot (903.3 m^{2}) and is the former home of Henry Ford II, chairman and CEO of Ford Motor Company, grandson of Henry Ford.
Grosse Pointe South High School		1928	11 Grosse Pointe Blvd. 42°23′27″N 82°54′8″W	Georgian	George J. Haas	Listed on the National Register of Historic Places.
Grosse Pointe Memorial Church		1927	16 Lake Shore Dr.	Neo-Gothic	William E.N. Hunter	Listed on the National Register of Historic Places.
Grosse Pointe Yacht Club		1929	Lake Shore Dr. at Vernier	Venetian	Guy Lowell	
Henry B. Joy House			Lake Shore Dr. at Kerby		Albert Kahn	"Fair Acres" estate, home of the President of the Packard Motor Company.
J. Bell Moran House- "Bellmoor"		1928	15420 Windmill Pointe Drive	Tudor	Robert O. Derrick	A 12,000-square-foot (1,100 m^{2}) lakefront mansion, the centerpiece of the Windmill Pointe strand of mansions.
Purdy-Kresge House		1929	1012 Three Mile Drive	Tudor	Leonard Willeke	A 7,700-square-foot (720 m^{2}) house along a notable row.
Saint Paul Catholic Church		1899	157 Lake Shore Dr. 42°23′41″N 82°53′37″W	French Gothic	Harry J. Rill	Listed on the National Register of Historic Places.
Murray Sales House		1917	251 Lincoln	Neo-Renaissance	Louis Kamper	A white-stucco estate designed by the famed Washington Blvd. architect.
Carl E. and Alice Candler Schmidt House		1904	301 Lake Shore Rd. 42°24′18″N 82°53′18″W	Tudor		Listed on the National Register of Historic Places.
William B. and Mary Chase Stratton House		1927	938 Three Mile Dr. 42°22′43″N 82°55′24″W			Listed on the National Register of Historic Places.
"Kasteel Batavia" R.W. Judson House		1927	15324 Windmill Pointe Drive. 42°21′46.22″N 82°55′30.63″W	Tudor	Wallace Frost	A 9,931-square-foot (922.6 m^{2}) lakefront mansion, Original site of the Windmill with one of the only remaining original French missionary pear trees. Home of the President of Continental Motors.
John T. Woodhouse House		1920	33 Old Brook Ln. 42°24′24″N 82°53′18″W			Listed on the National Register of Historic Places.
Sutton Residence		1931	175 Merriweather Road	Colonial	Louis Kamper	The smallest family home by Kamper; built for his niece Paula Kling Sutton, and husband John R. Sutton Jr.
F. Caldwell Walker House		1929	211 Vendome Rd	Colonial	Robert O. Derrick	F. Caldwell Walker, grandson of distiller Hiram Walker, commissioned the 18,158-square-foot (1,686.9 m^{2}) mansion.

== Notable residents ==
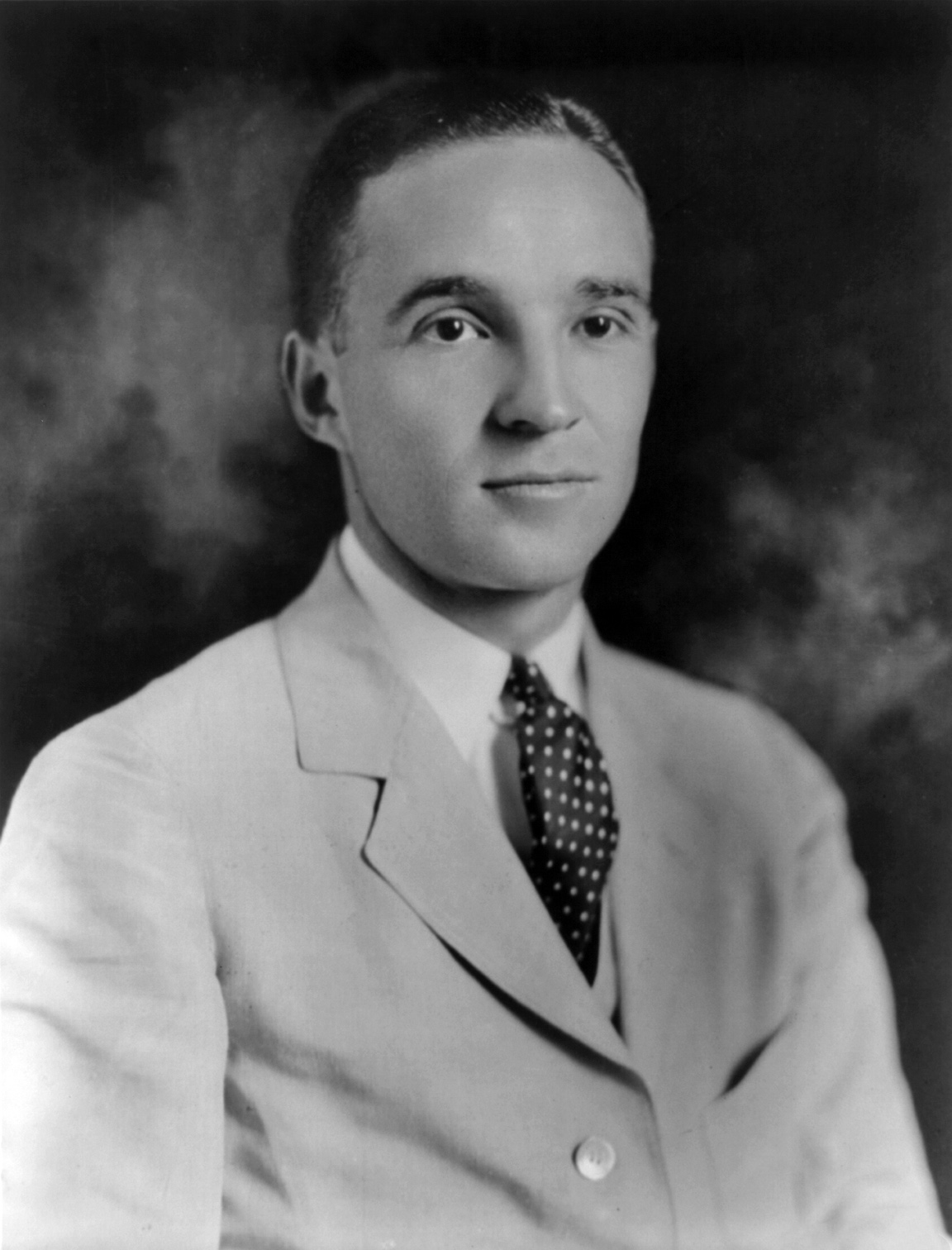
Edsel Ford of Grosse Pointe was the son of Henry Ford and served as the President of the Ford Motor Company.

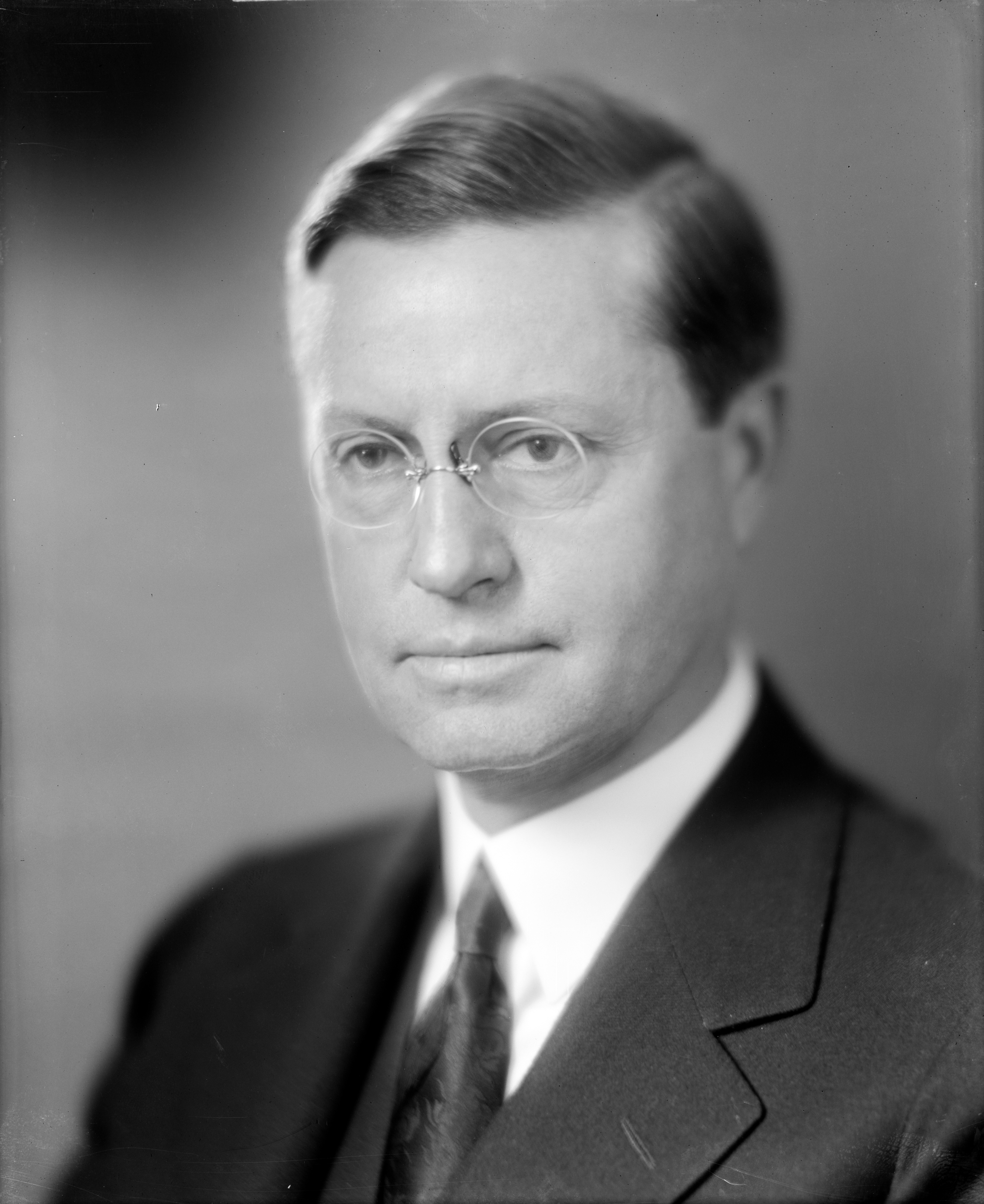
Roy D. Chapin of Grosse Pointe was the founder of the Hudson Motor Car Company and served as U.S. Secretary of Commerce.

- Gregg Alexander: New Radicals frontman, best known for their single "You Get What You Give"
- Anita Baker: soul singer
- Roy D. Chapin: 457 Lake Shore Drive, Hudson Motor Car Company founder, served as United States Secretary of Commerce. Architect John R. Pope designed the Georgian style Chapin house, built in 1927. In 1956, Henry Ford's grandson Henry Ford II purchased the home.
- Andrea Deck: actress
- Anna Thompson Dodge (Mrs. Horace E. Dodge): 12 Lake Shore; Rose Terrace Mansion was demolished in 1976
- Horace Dodge: automotive pioneer
- John Francis Dodge: automotive pioneer; 80,000+ sq ft home stood vacant for 20 years following his death
- Jeffrey Eugenides: Pulitzer Prize-winning novelist
- Prince Fielder: former Detroit Tiger; grew up in Grosse Pointe Park while his father was playing for the Tigers
- Edsel Ford and Eleanor Clay Ford: 1100 Lake Shore Drive; Edsel was son of Henry Ford; public tours
- Henry Ford II: 160 Provencal Rd.; grandson of Henry Ford
- Martha Firestone Ford: owner of the Detroit Lions; granddaughter of Harvey Samuel Firestone
- William Clay Ford: grandson of Henry Ford
- William Clay Ford Jr.: great-grandson of Henry Ford
- Alexander Grant: 18th-century Royal Navy officer, Administrator of Upper Canada, and founder of Grosse Pointe
- John 5: guitarist and songwriter
- Russell A. Alger: United States Senator, and Secretary of War
- Henry B. Joy: president of Packard Motor Car Company
- Cornelia Groefsema Kennedy: Federal District Court Judge, later appointed to the Sixth Circuit Court of Appeals
- Edie Kerouac-Parker: first wife of Jack Kerouac
- Aaron Krickstein (born 1967): tennis player, world #6
- George Lothrop: Attorney General of Michigan, and later U.S. Ambassador to Russia
- Kirk Maltby: forward for the Detroit Red Wings
- Stephen Murphy III: Chief Federal District Court Judge; United States Attorney in Detroit
- Serge Obolensky: Russian aristocrat, American paratrooper in WWII, and businessman
- Roger Penske: founder of Penske Automotive Group
- Carly Piper: Olympic swimmer; won gold medal in Athens in 2004 for the 4 × 200 m freestyle relay
- Sharon Elery Rogers, composer
- J.K. Simmons: Academy Award winning Actor
- Quinn XCII: Singer and songwriter
- Corey Tropp: forward for the Buffalo Sabres
- Ralph Wilson: owner of the Buffalo Bills; long-time Shores resident
- Meg White: member of The White Stripes; born in Grosse Pointe Farms
- G. Mennen Williams: Governor and Chief Justice of the Michigan Supreme Court
- Marianne Williamson: Democratic candidate for President of the United States of America

== References and further reading ==
- A&E with Richard Guy Wilson, Ph.D. (2000). America's Castles: The Auto Baron Estates, A&E Television Network.
- Bridenstine, James (1989). Edsel and Eleanor Ford House. Wayne State University Press. ISBN 0-8143-2161-5.
- Cantor, George (2005). Detroit: An Insiders Guide to Michigan. University of Michigan Press. ISBN 0-472-03092-2.
- Fisher, Dale (2003). Building Michigan: A Tribute to Michigan's Construction Industry. Grass Lake, MI: Eyry of the Eagle Publishing. ISBN 1-891143-24-7.
- Godzak, Roman (2000). Archdiocese of Detroit (Images of America). Arcadia Publishing. ISBN 0-7385-0797-0.
- Godzak, Roman (2004). Catholic Churches of Detroit (Images of America). Arcadia Publishing. ISBN 0-7385-3235-5.
- Godzak, Roman (2000). Make Straight the Path: A 300 Year Pilgrimage Archdiocese of Detroit. Editions du Signe. ISBN 2-7468-0145-0.
- Hill, Eric J.; John Gallagher (2002). AIA Detroit: The American Institute of Architects Guide to Detroit Architecture. Wayne State University Press. ISBN 0-8143-3120-3.
- Meyer, Katherine Mattingly and Martin C.P. McElroy with Introduction by W. Hawkins Ferry, Hon A.I.A. (1980). Detroit Architecture A.I.A. Guide Revised Edition. Wayne State University Press. ISBN 0-8143-1651-4.
- Socia, Madeleine; Suzie Berschback (2001). Grosse Pointe: 1890 - 1930 (Images of America). Arcadia. ISBN 0-7385-0840-3.
- Tentler, Leslie Woodcock with foreword by Edmund Cardinal Szoka (1992). Seasons of Grace: A History of the Catholic Archdiocese of Detroit. Wayne State University Press. ISBN 0-8143-2106-2.
- Tutag, Nola Huse with Lucy Hamilton (1988). Discovering Stained Glass in Detroit. Wayne State University Press. ISBN 0-8143-1875-4.
- Woodford, Arthur M. (2001). This is Detroit 1701–2001. Wayne State University Press. ISBN 0-8143-2914-4.
