= Paul Harvey Deming House =

Historic house in Michigan, United States

- U.S. National Register of Historic Places
- Michigan State Historic Site
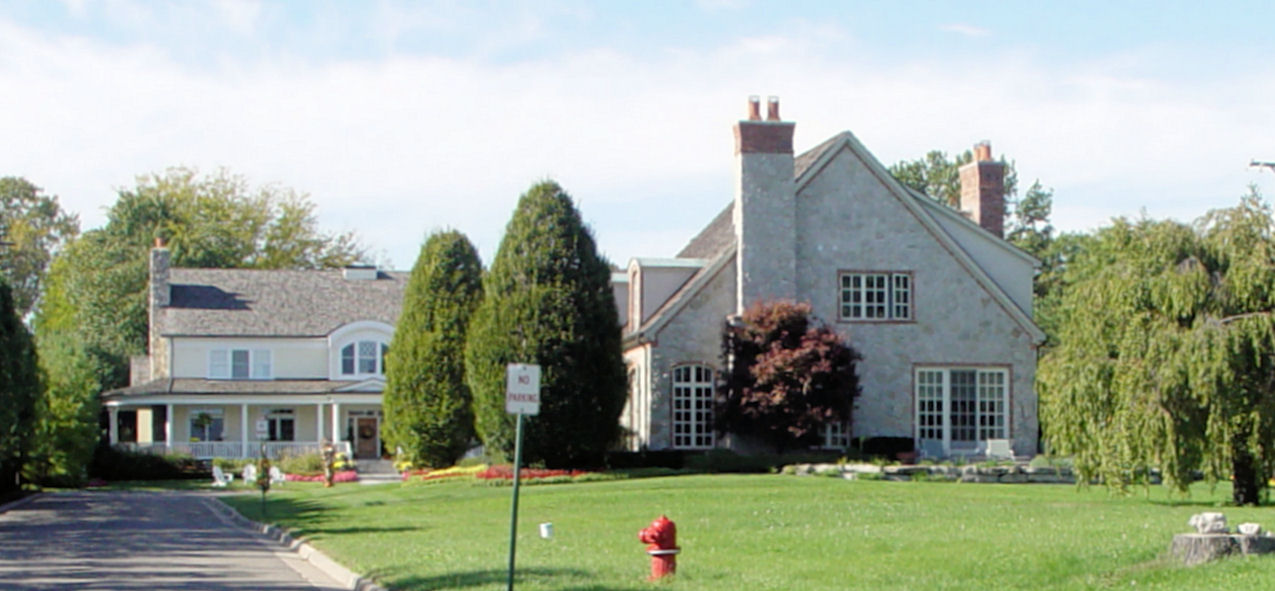
- Houses on the Paul Harvey Deming property, 2009

- Location within Michigan Location within the United States
- Interactive map
- Location: 111 Lake Shore Rd., Grosse Pointe Farms, Michigan
- Coordinates: 42°23′30″N 82°53′40″W
- Built: 1907
- Architectural style: Tudor Revival
- Demolished: 1997
- NRHP reference No.: 96000811

Significant dates
- Added to NRHP: July 25, 1996
- Designated MSHS: October 17, 1996

The Paul Harvey Deming House (also known as "Cherryhurst") was a private residence located at 111 Lake Shore Rd. in Grosse Pointe Farms, Michigan. It was listed on the National Register of Historic Places and designated a Michigan State Historic Site in 1996 and demolished in 1997.

== History ==
The Paul Harvey Deming House, built in 1907, was one of the first year-round residences constructed in Grosse Pointe Farms. It was built in the site of some of the first of the area's summer cottages, built in the late 1800s. The lot on which the house was built is a long and narrow lakefront property, measuring 150 feet (46 m) wide and 614 feet (187 m) deep.

== Paul Harvey Deming ==
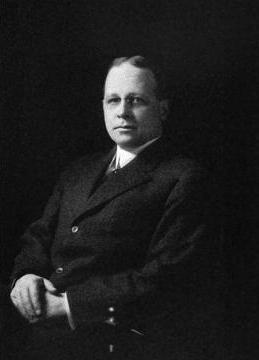
Paul Harvey Deming

Paul Harvey Deming was born in Cleveland, Ohio on June 19, 1874. His father was one of the earliest residents of that city and the directing head of the George Worthington Company. He attended school in Cleveland as well as Cornell University before entering the business of automobile manufacturing with the White Motor Company, manufacturer of the White Steamer. In 1904, Deming married Helen Smith of Detroit, and in 1905, he left Cleveland to become vice-president of the American State Bank of Detroit, the position he held when this house was built. Deming stayed with American until 1919, when he joined House Financing Corporation of Detroit. Deming was also Chairman of the Board of the George Worthington Company.

== Description ==
The house (link to view) was a 15000 square foot, two-and-a-half-story Tudor Revival built in the shape of a U. The exterior of the house was covered with stucco, with decorative half-timbers typical of Tudor architecture in the gables. The main entrance, on one side of the U, was covered by a porte-cochere. The roof consisted of intersecting gables, steeply pitched.

The house sat on the rear half of the lot, and was reached by a private drive from Lakeshore Road. The grounds were well-landscaped.
