= Grosse Pointe War Memorial =

- Russell A. Alger Jr. House
- U.S. National Register of Historic Places
- Michigan State Historic Site
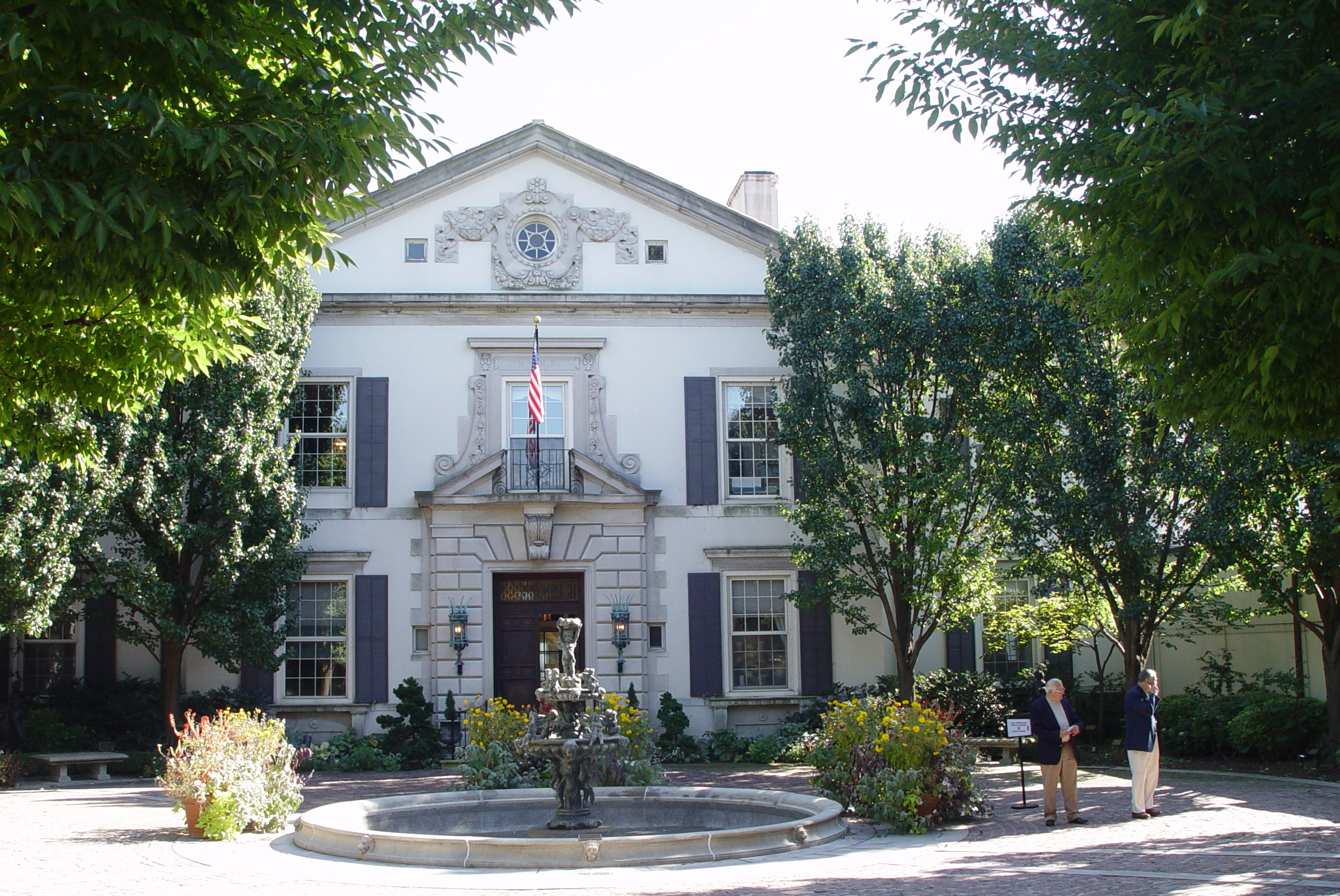
- Interactive map
- Location: 32 Lake Shore Drive; Grosse Pointe Farms, Michigan
- Coordinates: 42°23′13″N 82°53′50″W
- Built: 1910
- Architect: Charles A. Platt
- Architectural style: Italian Renaissance Revival
- NRHP reference No.: 82002917

Significant dates
- Added to NRHP: July 8, 1982
- Designated MSHS: February 18, 1982

The War Memorial, also known as the Russell A. Alger Jr. House and as the Moorings was dedicated to the memory of veterans and soldiers of World War II. It is located at 32 Lake Shore Drive in Grosse Pointe Farms, Michigan.

== History ==
Russell A. Alger senior was a Civil War general and lumberman from Michigan. He served as the Governor of Michigan, a United States Senator from Michigan, and United States Secretary of War under William McKinley. His eldest son, Russell A. Alger Jr., was born in 1873. The Junior Alger was the executor of his father's large estate, one of the founders of the Packard Motor Car Company in 1903, and an early investor in the Wright Company in 1909.

In 1896, Alger Jr. married Marion Jarvis. In 1910, the couple commissioned Charles A. Platt to design this house. The Algers and their three children moved in during 1910, and Russell Alger lived here until his death in 1930. Marion Alger moved out a few years later, and the house was donated to the Detroit Institute of Arts in 1936. In 1948 the house was returned to the Alger family. In 1949, the Alger family donated the house to the Grosse Pointe War Memorial Association.

The Alger House is the original building, and is now recognized as a Michigan State Historic Site and is listed on the National Register of Historic Places. In 1962 the first addition, the Fries Auditorium and Crystal Ballroom, was dedicated, and in 1993 the Center for Arts and Communications was added.

Today the War Memorial also serves as a community center for the Grosse Pointe Communities and hosts several different kinds of programs and events, including concerts, holiday celebrations, driver education, obedience school for dogs, and social dances for middle school-age children. The War Memorial also broadcasts WMTV 5, Grosse Pointe's local, twenty-four-hour television station. It is also possible to rent rooms for special events or banquets.

== Description ==
The Russell A. Alger Jr. House is an Italian Renaissance Revival style mansion situated on one of the highest locations along the shoreline of Lake St. Clair. Major room orientations take advantage of the lake view. The house is symmetric, hipped roof rectangular structure, clad with stucco, having two stories facing the street and three facing the lake. The street facade has a central entrance pavilion decorated with rusticated stone with a small balcony above. The second floor window above the balcony is elaborately detailed.

Inside, the entry foyer is dressed in marble, and a monumental stone staircase leads to the second floor. Inside is the reception hall, with a herringbone pattern wood floor, concrete ceiling beams simulating wood and a large stone fireplace. The main floor also contains a library and formal dining room, both with French doors overlooking the lake. The upper level contains a master suite built for the Algers, with two bedrooms, two bathrooms, and a connecting sitting room. There are four more bedrooms: one each for the Alger's three children, and a guest bedroom. The lower level of the house contains a den, a billiard room, and a large plant room. Doors lead out onto the terrace toward the lake.

The house and associated landscaping are in original condition. An auditorium, designed to complement the house, was added in 1962. An art wing was added on the street side in 1977 and another wing added in 1993.
