= John T. Woodhouse House =

Historic house in Michigan, United States

- John Thompson Woodhouse House
- U.S. National Register of Historic Places
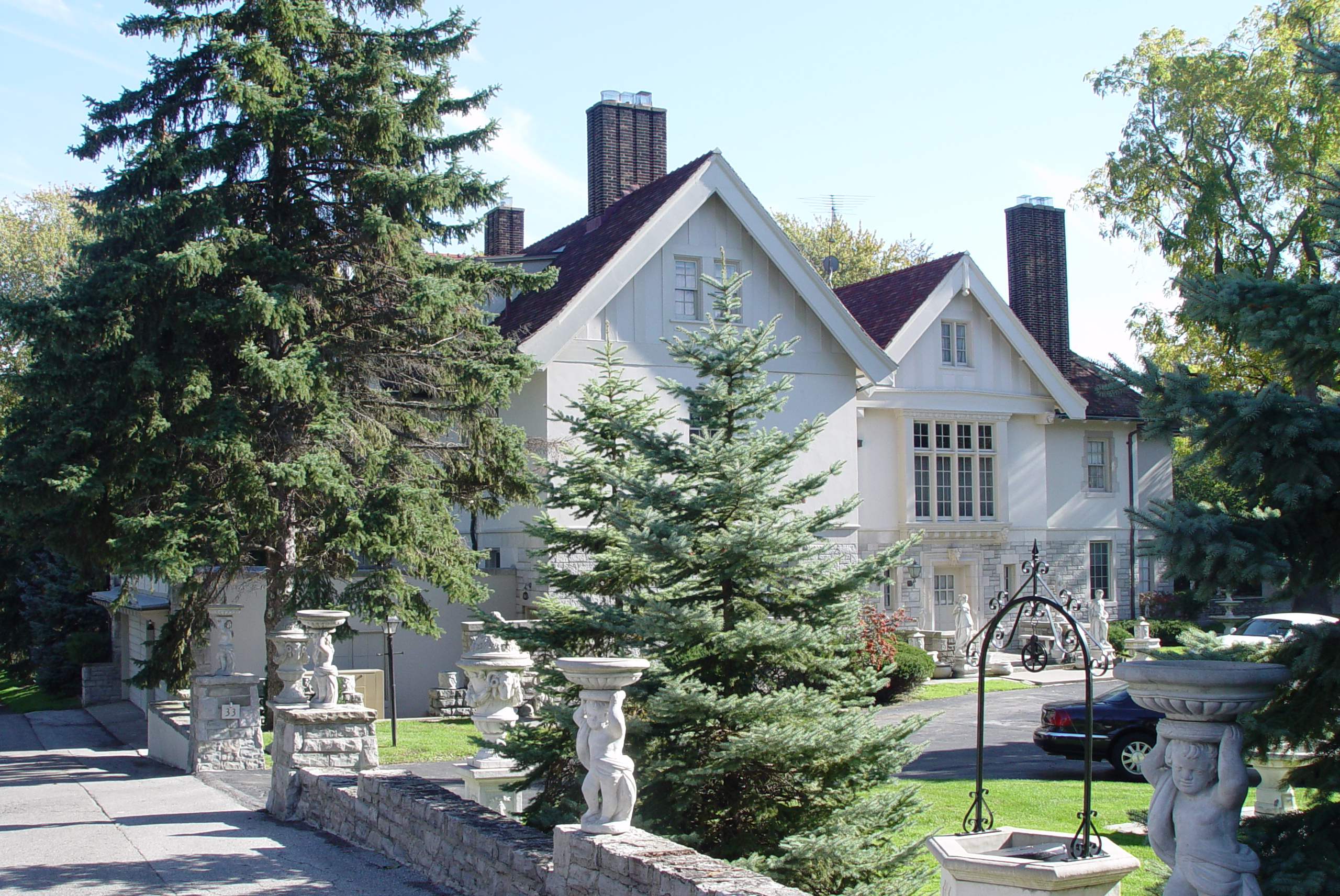
- Interactive map
- Location: 33 Old Brook Ln., Grosse Pointe Farms, Michigan
- Coordinates: 42°24′24″N 82°53′18″W
- Architect: George D. Mason
- Architectural style: Tudor Revival
- NRHP reference No.: 05000715
- Added to NRHP: July 20, 2005

The John Thompson Woodhouse House is a private house located at 33 Old Brook Ln. in Grosse Pointe Farms, Michigan. It was listed on the National Register of Historic Places in 2005.

== John Thompson Woodhouse ==
John Thompson Woodhouse was born on September 3, 1861, in Waterford, Ontario to William Thomas Woodhouse and Elizabeth Thompson, and came with his family to Detroit in 1874. In 1880 he became a clerk at the M.L. Wagner Company, a small tobacco products manufacturing company. By 1881 he was a partner in the firm, and from there on the company flourished. By 1892 the name had changed to the Wagner and Woodhouse Company, and in 1901 became John T. Woodhouse & Company. By 1911, Woodhouse was the company's president and sole owner.

Woodhouse had married Alice Matilda Goodyear, daughter of Nicholas Goodyear and Jane Almond, on January 30, 1884, in Detroit, Michigan; together they had six children, one of whom died in infancy. However, Alice died on March 4, 1911, in Detroit, Michigan. Woodhouse remarried on April 26, 1913, in Detroit, Michigan to his second wife, Elizabeth E. Ewing, daughter of John Timothy Ewing and Elizabeth Johnson, but the couple divorced on December 17, 1926, in Detroit, Michigan. In the meantime, John T. Woodhouse & Company continued to grow, and moved into a new headquarters in downtown Detroit where Hart Plaza is now located. In 1917, Woodhouse hired George D. Mason to construct this house. It was built between 1918 and 1920. Woodhouse moved into this house once it was built, and in the late 1920s turned his business over to his son, John Thompson Woodhouse Jr. Woodhouse remarried to his third wife Clara S. Frederick, daughter of Charles N. Frederick and Selma Dreher, on August 19, 1929, in Niagara Falls, New York, but financial losses due to the Great Depression caused him despair, and he committed suicide in this house on January 25, 1930.

== Further history ==
After John Sr.'s death in 1930, his son John moved into the house. He sold off portions of the surrounding property as lots. The younger John maintained ownership of both John T. Woodhouse & Company and of this house until his death on December 10, 1967, in Grosse Pointe Farms, Michigan. At this point, the house was put up for sale. The house was purchased in 1974 by Drs. E. G. and Aspasia Metropoulos, who undertook a substantial renovation of the property.

== Description ==
The John Thompson Woodhouse House is a 2 1/2-story, irregularly massed Tudor Revival house with a tile roof designed by George D. Mason. It is similar in design to the 1915 house Mason designed for Charles T. Fisher, located on West Boston Boulevard in Detroit in what is now the Boston-Edison Historic District. The Woodhouse house has a combination gable and hip roof, and is finished in rock-face random ashlar limestone on the first story and stucco above. The gables are half-timbered, and the facade is trimmed with smooth-cut limestone.

The house is unusual in that it has two prominent facades. The original front, once visible from Lake Shore Road, has a center entrance with an elaborate stone pediment above containing garlands of fruit and the sculptured head of the Greek goddess Hera. The entry doorway contains a double door flanked by sidelights. A two-story bay window containing multi-light windows with decorative carved stone panels sits next to the entrance. A metal balconet under a broad tripartite window sits above the entrance. On the other side of the house, the current main entrance is in the center of an irregular facade. The entryway is set in a square-headed limestone door surround with a sculptured stone head of Zeus centrally positioned above the door. Above that is a bank of windows.

Inside the house, the entry is through a small vestibule which opens into a large entry hall containing the main staircase. The entry hall has a heavy oak beamed ceiling and oak floor, and the staircase is constructed from heavy carved dark oak. The living room and dining room are off the entry hall. The living room has oak wainscoting and bookcases, a dark oak floor, and a carved stone fireplace. The dining room has decorative molding with patterned frieze encircling the room. The nearby breakfast room has a Pewabic tile floor.

The original address of the John Thompson Woodhouse home was 337 lake Shore Drive, Grosse Pointe Farms, Wayne County, Michigan, USA. The John Thompson Woodhouse palatial home was modeled after Scale Hall in Skerton, Ecclesiastical District of St. Luke's, Lancashire, England, which had been occupied by one branch of the Woodhouse family for generations.
