= Grosse Pointe Memorial Church =

Historic church in Michigan, United States

- U.S. National Register of Historic Places
- Michigan State Historic Site
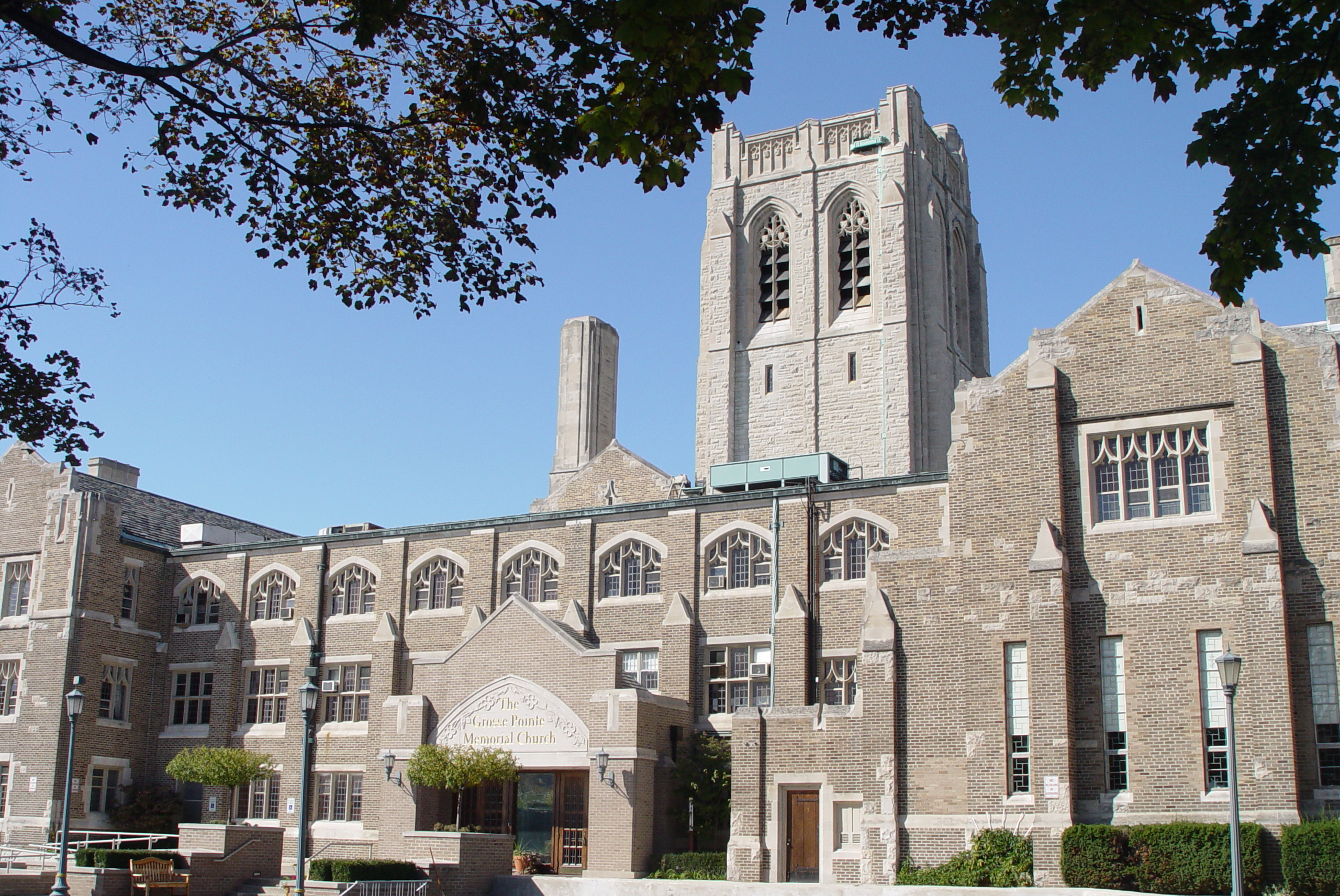
- Interactive map
- Location: 16 Lake Shore Dr., Grosse Pointe Farms, Michigan
- Coordinates: 42°23′20″N 82°53′58″W
- Architect: W.E.N. Hunter, Corrick Brothers
- Architectural style: Late Gothic Revival
- NRHP reference No.: 93001351

Significant dates
- Added to NRHP: December 6, 1993
- Designated MSHS: April 19, 1990

The Grosse Pointe Memorial Church (GPMC) is a church located at 16 Lake Shore Drive in Grosse Pointe Farms, Michigan, USA. it is a member of the Presbyterian Church, USA (PCUSA). It was designated a Michigan State Historic Site in 1990 and listed on the National Register of Historic Places in 1993.

== History ==
During the 18th and early 19th centuries, the area that is now the Grosse Pointes was largely Roman Catholic. By the mid-19th century, though, the area was being used more heavily as a summer resort for residents of Detroit, and enough Protestants had moved into the area to warrant their own church. In 1865, a group of Grosse Pointe residents founded the non-denominational Grosse Pointe Protestant Evangelical Church; two years later, the group built a church at the corner of Lake Shore Drive and Kerby on land donated by Rufus Kerby. In 1894, Joseph H. Berry donated land near his home, which encompassed the site of the present church. A second building, known as the "ivy covered church", was built on the site.

In 1920, the congregation reorganized as a Presbyterian church. Truman Handy Newberry and his brother John donated nearly $300,000 to the congregation for a new church building, as a memorial to their parents John and Helen. The congregation hired the architect W. E. N. Hunter to design the current building, which consists of the church itself and four additional units, constructed between 1923 and 1927. In 1925, the church changed its name to "The Grosse Pointe Memorial Church", reflecting the Newberry's gift. The new sanctuary, built on the site of the ivy-covered church, was dedicated to the original founders of the congregation on May 15, 1927.

An educational wing was added to the structure in 1962. The additional space housed the Barbour Chapel, Fitt Library, Fellowship Hall, and more Christian Education facilities. The church building was listed on the National Register of Historic Places in 1993. In 1997, the church undertook a major renovation project, which included adding a lakeside entry and reception area and enlarging the chancel.

== Today ==
=== Pastor and staff ===
Today, Grosse Pointe Memorial Church is led by Head of Staff, Jeff Lincicome, Associate Pastor, Heather Thum-Gerber, and the Minister of Music & Organist is Logan Hamilton . The Church employs approximately 25 staff, both full and part-time.

=== Capital campaign ===
In 2014, GPMC undertook a capital campaign for various renovations around the church, as well as starting new projects. Examples include:

- Stained glass windows (Remove, repair, reinforce, reinstall)
- Carillon (repair steel frame that holds bells, rewire connections to console, recast, rehang existing bells, add new and final bell (the largest))
- Outreach: Habitat for Humanity (3 habitat houses in 3 years)
- Columbarium (expand capacity by approx 250 niches)
- Sanctuary upgrades (wiring for lights, boiler)
- Crib and toddler wing (update and renovate, make more secure and welcoming)
- Fellowship Hall and Youth Recreation Space
- Capital endowment funds

=== "Back 40" and Trinity Terrace renovations ===
The outdoor space behind the church on Lake Saint Clair is used as a worship space during the summer months. When the capital campaign was completed, it was expanded and renovated to create a flatter space. A playground was also installed, the garden was put in, and a shed was constructed. The "Back 40" was renamed Trinity Terrace. The expansion and renovation was mainly financed by the Kaiser family with the help of the Gallagher-Kaiser company.

== Architecture ==
The Grosse Pointe Memorial Church is a Neo-Gothic structure built of ashlar limestone trimmed with smooth sandstone and a slate roof. The structure is asymmetrically massed, with a cross-gable roof and bell tower. The front facade of the church is topped with a front gable. Each side elevation has four bays with pairs of stained-glass clerestory windows; the bays are separated by piers.

The central nave is laid out in the form of a Latin cross with a vaulted ceiling. Aisles on each side are separated from the nave by masonry pillars, with the clerestory windows above. On each side of the church, three-story cross-gabled units present arched entryways and flat-topped diamond-pane windows.

The church contains carvings by the German sculptor Alois Lang and stained glass windows designed by the Willet Studios.
