= Carl E. and Alice Candler Schmidt House =

Historic house in Michigan, United States

- U.S. National Register of Historic Places
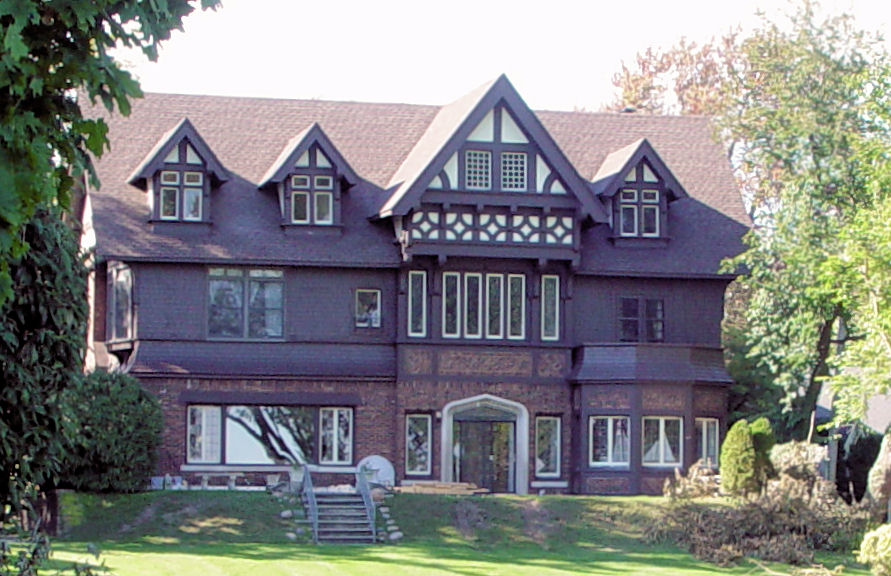
- Interactive map
- Location: 301 Lake Shore Rd., Grosse Pointe Farms, Michigan
- Coordinates: 42°24′18″N 82°53′18″W
- Built: 1904
- Architectural style: Tudor Revival
- NRHP reference No.: 05000909
- Added to NRHP: August 24, 2005

The Carl E. and Alice Candler Schmidt House is a private home located at 301 Lake Shore Rd. in Grosse Pointe Farms, Michigan. It was listed on the National Register of Historic Places in 2005. Built in 1904, the house is one of the oldest remaining properties in the Grosse Pointes to have a view of Lake Saint Clair.

== Carl E. Schmidt ==
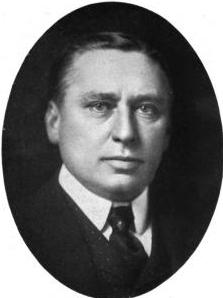
Carl E. Schmidt

Carl E. Schmidt was born in Detroit on December 31, 1858, the eldest son of Traugott Schmidt. He was educated in the schools of Detroit and Germany, and learned the tanning trade from his father. Schmidt worked in his father's firm, which exported skins, furs, and wool, until the latter's death in 1897; soon after, he opened an independent tannery under the name Carl E. Schmidt & Company, located in what is now Trapper's Alley on Monroe.

Schmidt was active in politics, serving as a member of the Detroit Board of Police Commissioners, the state board of arbitration and mediation, and the state board of forest inquiry. He was for some time a close friend and political advisor to Hazen Pingree, who served as both mayor of Detroit and governor of Michigan.

In 1880, Schmidt married Alice M. Candler, the daughter of a prominent Detroit businessman. The couple had three daughters: Emma, Alice, and Ida. Schmidt died in 1934.

== Ray Smith ==
Ray Smith's parents purchased the property in the 1920s. At this time the property stretched from Lake Shore to at least Grosse Pointe Blvd. Ray Smith was an avid horticulturist and was a pioneer in the field of farming in Michigan. He was independently wealthy and thus never needed to support himself by working. Whenever he needed cash, he simply sold off a parcel of the land. Ray Smith never married, but was considered something of a playboy in his later years. He was a frequent escort of Eleanor Ford's after her husband's death.

Smith's parents made some major changes to the property upon their purchase. The property was originally intended to only be used as a summer cottage and thus has only one closet on the first floor. It originally had an outdoor porch on the back side of the house. The Smiths closed that up and made it into a room with 9 large windows. The Smiths also combined three rooms on the Kerby side of the home to form one great room. Perhaps one of the biggest changes, however, was the removal of the front porch.

== 1990s Remodel ==
When the third owners moved in, they too remodeled the home, however not to the extent of the 1920s remodel. The third owners completely redesigned the kitchen from the ground up. They found several layers of flooring in the kitchen that had been put on top of each other including linoleum and wood. They redid the flooring in the great room. They redid the plaster in the butler's pantry only to later find out that pipes above the redo were leaking, so everything would have to be taken out, the pipes replaced, and then put back in. A large amount of plaster repair took place as well as some modernization. New pipes were put in on the first floor. A new gas furnace was installed to replace the coal fired furnace that was being used into the 1990s. Upstairs, new showers were put in to replace two old ones. The servants' quarters were turned into a variety of rooms including two guest bedrooms, an office and a laundry room. A new mudroom was added to the back entrance, and the former servants' dining room was turned into the breakfast room.

== Interesting facts ==
- Despite the age of the home (107 years), the home has only changed hands twice, the Schmidts to the Smiths and the Smiths to the current owners. Ray Smith owned the home for the majority of the time.

== Description ==
The Carl E. and Alice Candler Schmidt House was built in 1904. The Grosse Pointe Historical Society has incorrectly stated 1909, and as a result, many publications have copied that date incorrectly as referenced in the below source. It is a shingle style house with Tudor influences. When the house was built, it was a strip farm. The property stretched at least to what is now Grosse Pointe Bvld. The original carriage house still stands on the corner of Grosse Pointe Blvd and Kerby. After being sold by Ray Smith to raise cash, it was painted white and converted into a single family home.
