= Christ Church Chapel =

Historic church in Michigan, United States

- U.S. National Register of Historic Places
- Michigan State Historic Site
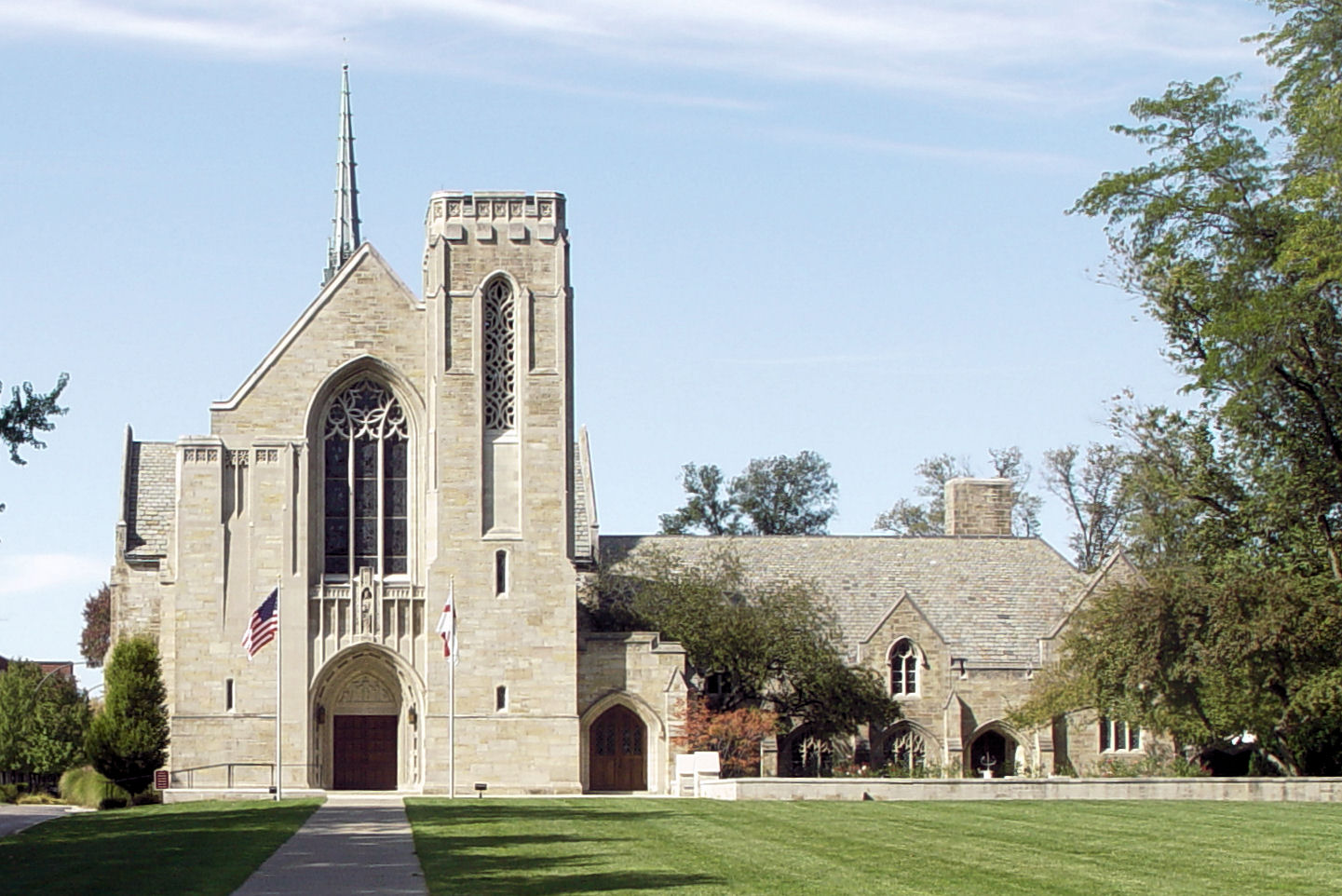
- Interactive map
- Location: 61 Grosse Pointe Blvd., Grosse Pointe Farms, Michigan
- Coordinates: 42°23′29″N 82°54′3″W
- Built: 1930
- Architect: Bertram Grosvenor Goodhue Associates et al.
- Architectural style: Tudor Revival, Late Gothic Revival
- NRHP reference No.: 93000424

Significant dates
- Added to NRHP: September 10, 1993
- Designated MSHS: September 24, 1992

The Christ Church Chapel is a religious building located at 61 Grosse Pointe Blvd. in Grosse Pointe Farms, Michigan. It is also known as the Christ Church Grosse Pointe or the Christ Episcopal Church. It was designated a Michigan State Historic Site in 1992 and listed on the National Register of Historic Places in 1993.

== History ==
The Grosse Pointe Episcopal congregation began as a branch of Christ Church Detroit in 1923, with Sunday school held in local homes while worship services were still conducted in the main church on Jefferson Avenue. By 1928, work had begun on the construction of a building for the congregation. The building, completed in 1930, was initially referred to as a "chapel," because it was intended to be one element of a larger building.

Two more buildings were added to the complex over the next eleven years: the rectory in 1938 and Miller Hall in 1941. In 1947, the congregation was given the status of a full parish. An education building, designed by Minoru Yamasaki, was added in 1955. Further additions were made during the latter half of the century, and in 2000 the education building was torn down and replaced with a new education wing.

== Description ==
The Neo-Gothic chapel is built in a Latin cross configuration with a 50-foot (15 m) tower at one corner. The narthex is designed to be similar to the Chapter House of Wells Cathedral, and the cloister (enclosed in 1957) is modeled after the one at Canterbury Cathedral.

The exterior of the chapel is covered with iridescent sandstone. The roof is covered with slate, with copper ridges and a copper spire. The church includes stained glass windows created by Henry Lee Willet (Willet Stained Glass Studios), DeRaniere Studios of Detroit, and by the Detroit Stained Glass Company. The interior is constructed of limestone, with a flagstone floor. It boasts fine wood carvings, with the reredos crafted by London's Mowbray & Co., Ltd. and the rood beam and other pieces by J. Jungwirth Co. and Pom-McFate Co. of Detroit.

Miller Hall and the rectory are built in a complementary Tudor Revival style.
