= Beverly Road Historic District =

Historic district in Michigan, United States

- U.S. National Register of Historic Places
- U.S. Historic district
- Michigan State Historic Site
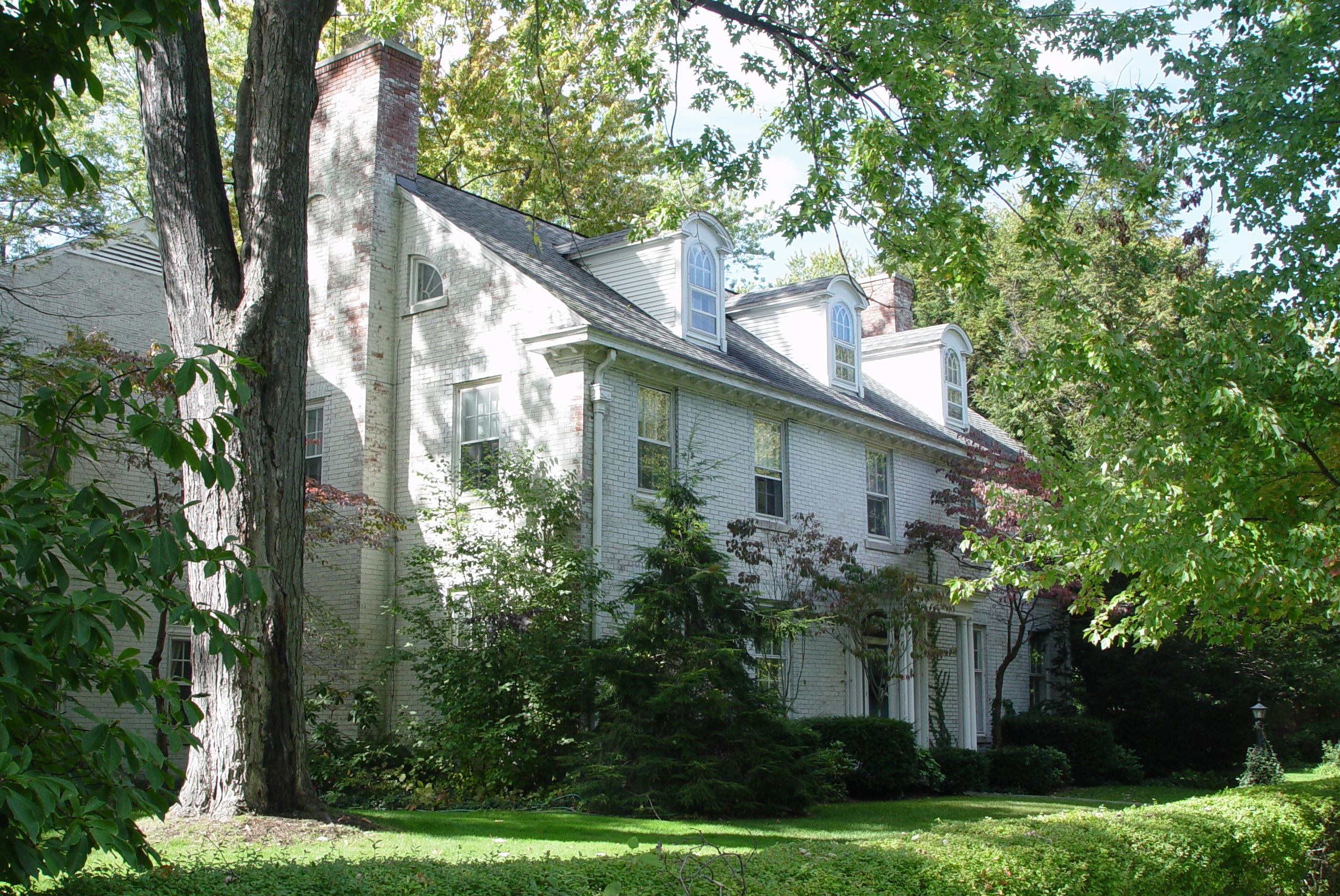

- Location within Michigan Location within the United States
- Interactive map
- Location: 23-45 Beverly Rd., Grosse Pointe Farms, Michigan
- Coordinates: 42°23′18″N 82°54′6″W
- Built: 1911
- Architect: Albert Kahn, Robert O. Derrick, Raymond Carey, and Marcus Burrowes, et al.
- Architectural style: Late 19th And 20th Century Revivals
- NRHP reference No.: 94001428
- Added to NRHP: April 07, 1995

The Beverly Road Historic District is a historic district consisting of fifteen residential buildings located between 23 and 45 Beverly Road in Grosse Pointe Farms, Michigan. It was listed on the National Register of Historic Places in 1995.

== History ==
The Beverly Road Historic District covers the original area of the Beverly Park Subdivision, platted by Henry B. Joy in 1911. The district was one of the earliest upper-class subdivisions in the Grosse Pointes, and marked the change of the area from a farming and summer-home community into an upscale year-round community. Residents of the district included prominent company executives, businessmen, and lawyers such as William P. Hamilton, William Cornelius Crowley, Edwin R. Stroh, Sidney T. Miller, William Van Dyke, and Edwin B. Henry. Beverly Road is still one of the few private streets in Grosse Pointe Farms.

== Description ==
The structures in the district line both sides of Beverly Road from Lakeshore Drive to Grosse Pointe Boulevard. The homes are primarily large-scale and feature high-quality workmanship and design.
