= Wallace Frost =

American architect

- Born: Jon Wallace Frost; October 27, 1892; Uniontown, Pennsylvania
- Died: June 24, 1962 (aged 69); Birmingham, Michigan
- Occupation: Architect
- Spouse: Grace Bierer Frost
- Children: Jon Wallace Frost Jr.

Wallace Frost (October 27, 1892 – June 24, 1962) was an American architect.

== Early life ==
Frost was born in Uniontown, Pennsylvania. He studied architecture with Paul Cret at the University of Pennsylvania.

== World War I ==
During the war, Frost designed hangars for military installations in Washington, D.C. at the Naval Air Force. While he was there, he met Detroit architect Albert Kahn. Kahn asked Frost to come to Michigan to work with him and Frost moved there in 1919.

== Career ==
Frost settled in Birmingham, Michigan in 1921 and worked with Albert Kahn. In 1926, he started his own practice, and mostly designed homes in the Detroit suburbs. Frost designed 44 houses in or near Birmingham, and designed the Michigan Governor's Mansion. He is known for midsize cottage houses that are flooded with natural light and that feature woodwork, architectural details and limestone frames around windows and doors. Frost created a Birmingham house for himself at 579 Tooting Lane in 1921. People who lived in houses he built often called them "Wally" houses. A number of them are near Quarton Lake and in the Holy Name neighborhood.

Frost worked in Europe in 1932 and 1933, and then worked from 1933 until 1938 in Southern California. He built his own large home in Montecito, California in 1936. He returned to Birmingham in 1939 and practiced until 1961.

In 2005, basketball star Chris Webber purchased a 1927 Wallace Frost mansion in Grosse Pointe Park. He said, "I'm a lover of history and a Wallace Frost fan and I was completely blown away by this house."

=== Birmingham homes ===
In August 1992, the Historic District and Design Review Commission published a report titled "Wallace Frost: His Architecture in Birmingham, Michigan." It includes a list of homes in Birmingham that were designed by Frost.

- 660 Abbey Street (1945)
- 379 Aspen Road (1927)
- 404 Bonnie Brier (1941)
- 420 Bonnie Brier (1941)
- 436 Bonnie Brier (1941)
- 444 Bonnie Brier (1940)
- 467 Bonnie Brier (1941)
- 1283 Buckingham (1925)
- 752 Chestnut (1926)
- 219 Elm (1928)
- 795 Fairfax (1928)
- 1040 Gordon Lane (1926)
- 960 Harmon (1926)
- 440 lakepark (1930)
- 1169 Lakeside (1928)
- 1290 Lakeside (1946)
- 633 Lakeview (1929)
- 650 Lakeview (1930)
- 371 Linden Road (1924)
- 508 Linden Road (1928)
- 460 West Maple Road (1929)
- 26421 Normandy Road (Franklin 1928)
- 1390 Northlawn (1951)
- 1691 Oak (1947)
- 139 Pilgrim Avenue (1926)
- 187 Pilgrim Avenue (1925)
- 239 Pilgrim Avenue (1925)
- 515 Pilgrim Avenue (1925)
- 551 Pilgrim Avenue (1928)
- 671 Pilgrim Avenue (1924)
- 691 Pilgrim Avenue (1926)
- 783 Pilgrim Avenue (1928)
- 864 Pilgrim Avenue (1924)
- 236 Puritan (1925)
- 683 Puritan (1927)
- 788 Randall Court (1928)
- 967 Rivenoak (1926)
- 525 Southfield (1940)
- 515 Tooting Lane (1929)
- 579 Totting Lane (1921)
- 584 Tooting Lane (1926)
- 364 Valley View Lane (1939)
- 244 Wimbleton (1928)
- 715 Wimbleton (1928)
- 1050-1078 Wimbleton (1928)

== Family life ==
Frost married Grace Bierer in 1917. They had one son, Jon, born in 1920 (d. 2002). Wallace Frost died in 1962, of a heart attack, at the age of 69.
