= Grosse Pointe Farms, Michigan =

- City
- City of Grosse Pointe Farms
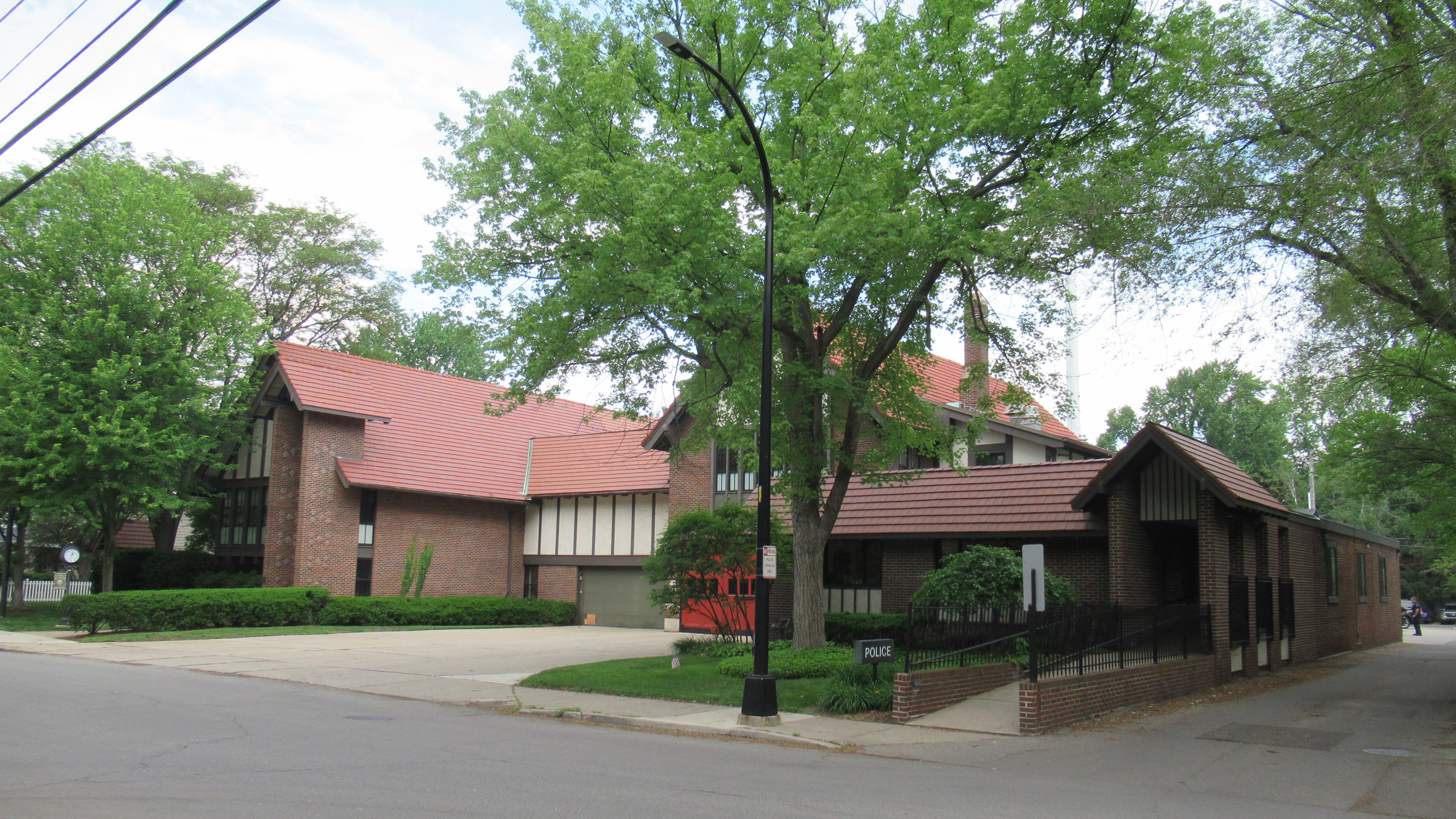
- Grosse Pointe Farms City Offices

- Seal

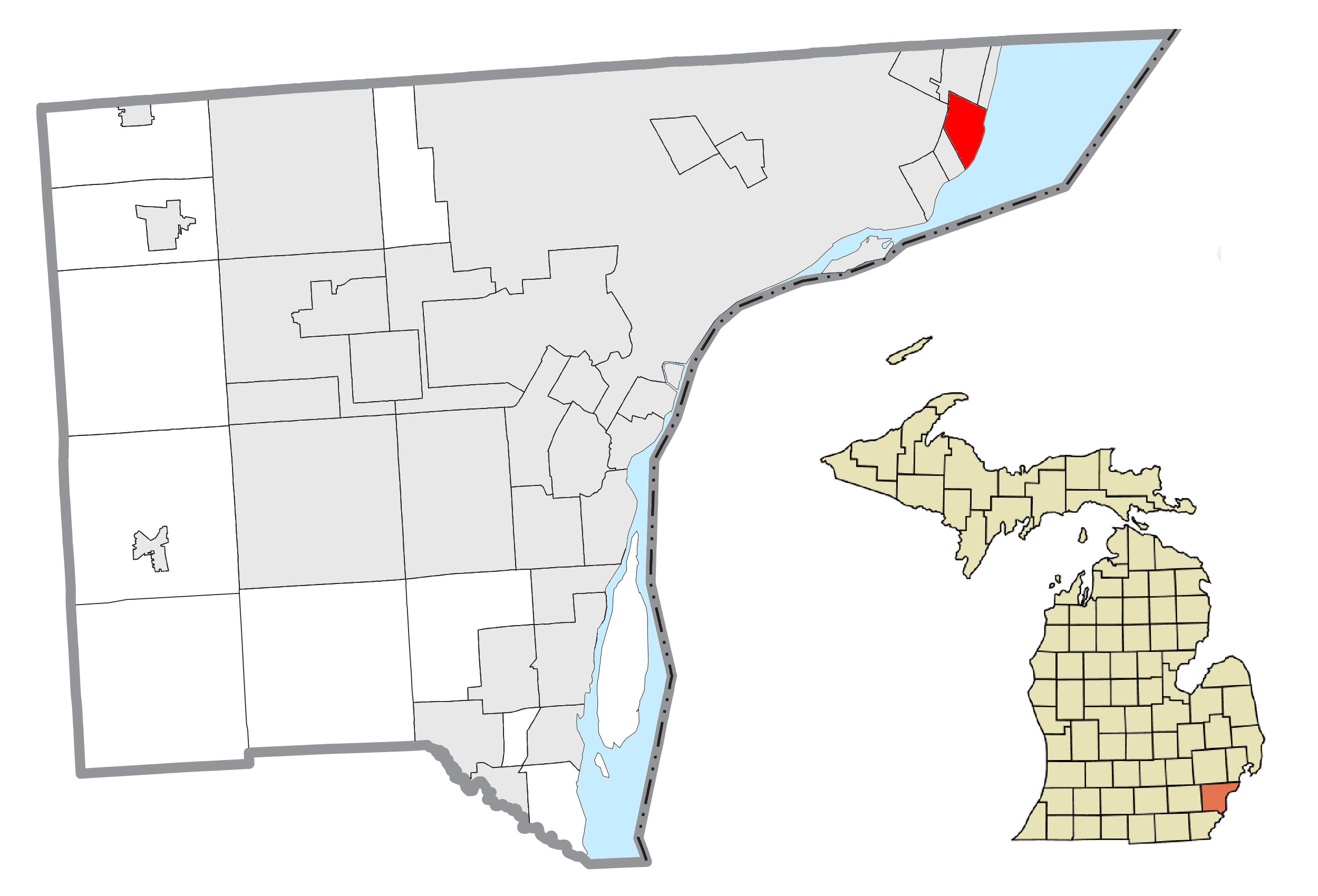
- Location within Wayne County

- Location within the State of Michigan Location within the United States
- Coordinates: 42°24′18″N 82°54′03″W
- Country: United States
- State: Michigan
- County: Wayne
- Incorporated: 1893 (village); 1949 (city)

Government
  - Type: Mayor–council
  - Mayor: Louis Theros (R)
  - Manager: Shane Reeside
  - Clerk: Derrick Kozicki

Area
  - City: 12.32 sq mi (31.92 km^{2})
  - Land: 2.73 sq mi (7.08 km^{2})
  - Water: 9.59 sq mi (24.84 km^{2})
- Elevation: 607 ft (185 m)

Population (2020)
  - City: 10,148
  - Density: 3,713.5/sq mi (1,433.79/km^{2})
  - Metro: 4,285,832 (Metro Detroit)
- Time zone: UTC-5 (EST)
  - Summer (DST): UTC-4 (EDT)
- ZIP Code(s): 48230, 48236
- Area code: 313
- FIPS code: 26-35520
- GNIS feature ID: 0627463
- Website: www.grossepointefarms.org

Grosse Pointe Farms is a city in Wayne County in the U.S. state of Michigan. One of the five "Grosse Pointe" suburbs of Detroit, Grosse Pointe Farms is located on the shore of Lake St. Clair and borders Detroit to the east, roughly 10 miles (16.1 km) east of downtown Detroit. As of the 2020 census, the city had a population of 10,148.

Grosse Pointe Farms was originally incorporated as a village in 1893 and again as a city in 1949.

== History ==
The area that would become Grosse Pointe Farms was originally incorporated as the Village of Grosse Pointe in 1879. By 1889, the village extended from land just above Provencal Road in the northeast to Cadieux Road in the west. In 1893, the portion of the village east of Fisher Road broke off and incorporated as the Village of Grosse Pointe Farms after a dispute over the location of a tavern. It was not until 1949, however, that the village incorporated as a city.

The U.S. Postal Service operates the Grosse Pointe Post office in Grosse Pointe Farms.

== Geography ==
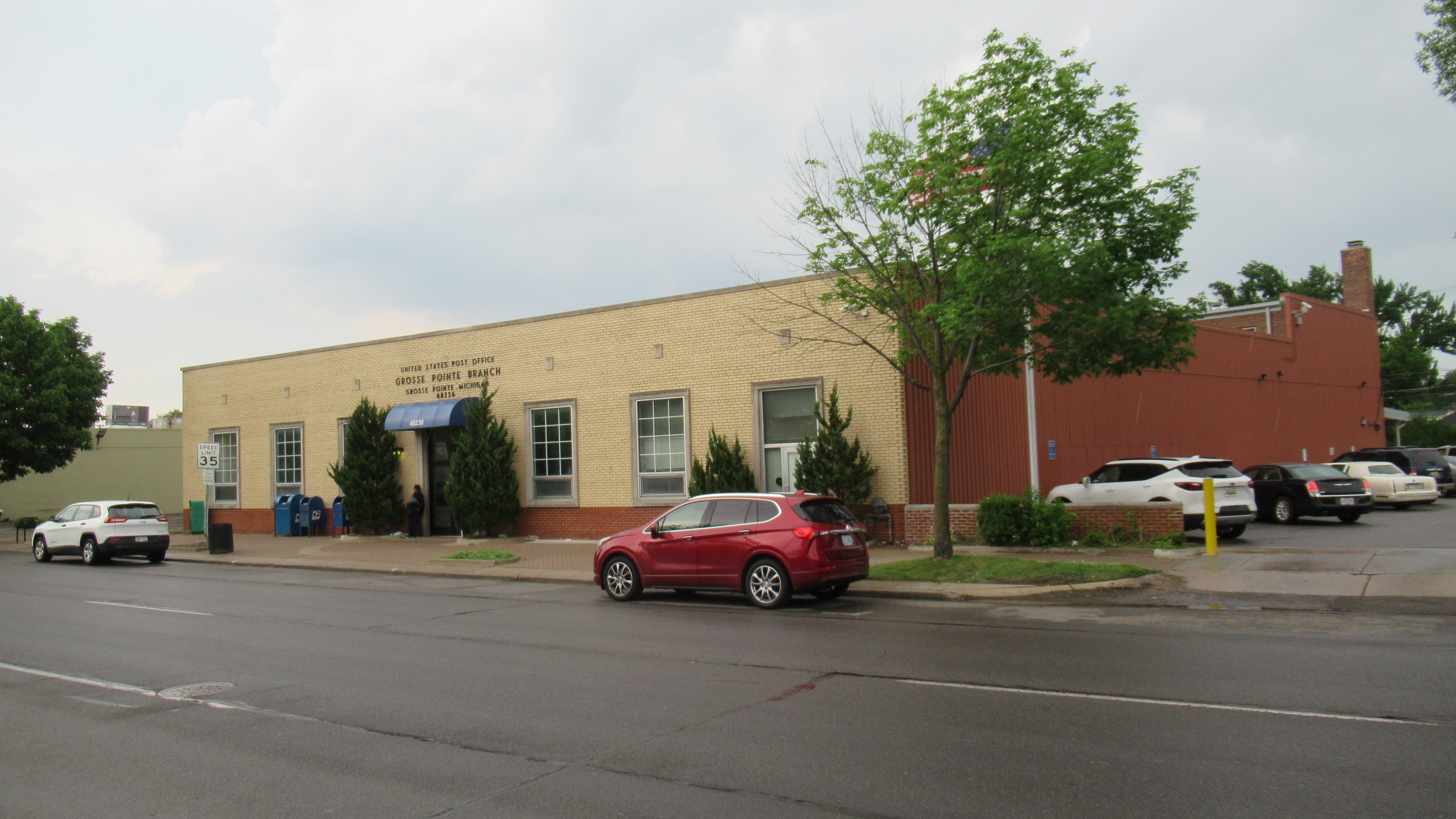
Grosse Pointe branch post office in Grosse Pointe Farms (48236 ZIP Code)

According to the United States Census Bureau, the city has a total area of 12.32 square miles (31.91 km^{2}), of which 2.75 square miles (7.12 km^{2}) is land and 9.57 square miles (24.79 km^{2}) is water. The water is part of Lake St. Clair.

The Farms has a more varied topography and streetscape than the other southern Grosse Pointes. While Grosse Pointe and Grosse Pointe Park are built on a standard street grid and are basically flat, Grosse Pointe Farms is partially built on the same grid flowing out of Detroit, but also features districts with irregular, curving street paths. A low but noticeable ridge runs through the center of the city. The Farms also contains the "point" in Grosse Pointe, where, just east of the Grosse Pointe War Memorial, there is a large bend in the lakeshore, such that those on the shoreline face east, instead of south, as they do when on the shoreline of neighboring Grosse Pointe, closer to the entrance of the Detroit River.

The cityscape varies widely, with large sections of old homes ranging from bungalows to mansions, and a few newer sections with ranch houses or luxury homes built on subdivided estates. The Farms has a downtown on Kercheval Avenue, "The Hill," combining historic buildings with newer, neo-traditional storefronts.

== Demographics ==
=== Racial and ethnic composition ===
Grosse Pointe Farms, Michigan – Racial and ethnic composition Note: the US Census treats Hispanic/Latino as an ethnic category. This table excludes Latinos from the racial categories and assigns them to a separate category. Hispanics/Latinos may be of any race.
| Race / Ethnicity (NH = Non-Hispanic) | Pop 2000 | Pop 2010 | Pop 2020 | % 2000 | % 2010 | % 2020 |
|---|---|---|---|---|---|---|
| White alone (NH) | 9,429 | 8,905 | 9,143 | 96.57% | 93.94% | 90.10% |
| Black or African American alone (NH) | 60 | 164 | 208 | 0.61% | 1.73% | 2.05% |
| Native American or Alaska Native alone (NH) | 11 | 16 | 13 | 0.11% | 0.17% | 0.13% |
| Asian alone (NH) | 110 | 117 | 178 | 1.13% | 1.23% | 1.75% |
| Native Hawaiian or Pacific Islander alone (NH) | 0 | 1 | 3 | 0.00% | 0.01% | 0.03% |
| Other race alone (NH) | 10 | 6 | 42 | 0.10% | 0.06% | 0.41% |
| Mixed race or Multiracial (NH) | 36 | 82 | 288 | 0.37% | 0.87% | 2.84% |
| Hispanic or Latino (any race) | 108 | 188 | 273 | 1.11% | 1.98% | 2.69% |
| Total | 9,764 | 9,479 | 10,148 | 100.00% | 100.00% | 100.00% |

Historical population
| Census | Pop. | Note | %± |
|---|---|---|---|
| 1900 | 817 | | — |
| 1910 | 862 | | 5.5% |
| 1920 | 1,649 | | 91.3% |
| 1930 | 3,533 | | 114.3% |
| 1940 | 7,217 | | 104.3% |
| 1950 | 9,410 | | 30.4% |
| 1960 | 12,172 | | 29.4% |
| 1970 | 11,701 | | −3.9% |
| 1980 | 10,551 | | −9.8% |
| 1990 | 10,092 | | −4.4% |
| 2000 | 9,764 | | −3.3% |
| 2010 | 9,479 | | −2.9% |
| 2020 | 10,148 | | 7.1% |
U.S. Decennial Census

=== 2020 census ===
As of the 2020 census, Grosse Pointe Farms had a population of 10,148. The median age was 46.0 years. 22.7% of residents were under the age of 18 and 22.0% of residents were 65 years of age or older. For every 100 females there were 94.1 males, and for every 100 females age 18 and over there were 90.9 males age 18 and over.

100.0% of residents lived in urban areas, while 0.0% lived in rural areas.

There were 3,889 households in Grosse Pointe Farms, of which 33.8% had children under the age of 18 living in them. Of all households, 64.4% were married-couple households, 11.0% were households with a male householder and no spouse or partner present, and 21.4% were households with a female householder and no spouse or partner present. About 22.2% of all households were made up of individuals and 13.9% had someone living alone who was 65 years of age or older.

There were 4,058 housing units, of which 4.2% were vacant. The homeowner vacancy rate was 1.0% and the rental vacancy rate was 12.7%.

=== 2010 census ===
As of the census of 2010, there were 9,479 people, 3,718 households, and 2,770 families residing in the city. The population density was 3,446.9 inhabitants per square mile (1,330.9/km^{2}). There were 3,952 housing units at an average density of 1,437.1 per square mile (554.9/km^{2}). The racial makeup of the city was 95.4% White, 1.8% African American, 0.2% Native American, 1.3% Asian, 0.4% from other races, and 1.0% from two or more races. Hispanic or Latino of any race were 2.0% of the population.

There were 3,718 households, of which 33.7% had children under the age of 18 living with them, 66.0% were married couples living together, 6.2% had a female householder with no husband present, 2.3% had a male householder with no wife present, and 25.5% were non-families. 23.0% of all households were made up of individuals, and 12.3% had someone living alone who was 65 years of age or older. The average household size was 2.55 and the average family size was 3.02.

The median age in the city was 45.1 years. 25.8% of residents were under the age of 18; 4.8% were between the ages of 18 and 24; 19.5% were from 25 to 44; 32.6% were from 45 to 64; and 17.5% were 65 years of age or older. The gender makeup of the city was 48.8% male and 51.2% female.

=== 2000 census ===
At the 2000 census, there were 9,764 people, 3,804 households, and 2,868 families residing in the city. The population density was 3,618.8 inhabitants per square mile (1,397.2/km^{2}). There were 3,937 housing units at an average density of 1,459.2 per square mile (563.4/km^{2}). The racial makeup of the city was 97.58% White, 0.65% African American, 0.11% Native American, 1.13% Asian, 0.11% from other races, and 0.42% from two or more races. Hispanic or Latino of any race were 1.11% of the population.

There were 3,804 households, of which 34.3% had children under the age of 18 living with them, 67.8% were married couples living together, 6.1% had a female householder with no husband present, and 24.6% were non-families. 22.3% of all households were made up of individuals, and 12.0% had someone living alone who was 65 years of age or older. The average household size was 2.57 and the average family size was 3.03.

Age distribution was 26.5% under the age of 18, 3.6% from 18 to 24, 23.4% from 25 to 44, 28.6% from 45 to 64, and 17.9% who were 65 years of age or older. The median age was 43 years. For every 100 females, there were 90.6 males. For every 100 females age 18 and over, there were 87.5 males.

The median household income was $100,153, and the median family income was $109,264. Males had a median income of $87,108 versus $53,241 for females. The per capita income for the city was $54,846. About 1.5% of families and 2.1% of the population were below the poverty line, including 3.1% of those under age 18 and 1.4% of those age 65 or over.

== Climate ==
Climate data for Grosse Pointe Farms, Michigan (1991–2020 normals, extremes 1950–present)
| Month | Jan | Feb | Mar | Apr | May | Jun | Jul | Aug | Sep | Oct | Nov | Dec | Year |
|---|---|---|---|---|---|---|---|---|---|---|---|---|---|
| Record high °F (°C) | 63 (17) | 69 (21) | 81 (27) | 90 (32) | 93 (34) | 105 (41) | 102 (39) | 101 (38) | 98 (37) | 90 (32) | 79 (26) | 69 (21) | 105 (41) |
| Mean daily maximum °F (°C) | 31.5 (−0.3) | 33.9 (1.1) | 42.9 (6.1) | 55.5 (13.1) | 67.0 (19.4) | 77.2 (25.1) | 82.0 (27.8) | 79.8 (26.6) | 72.7 (22.6) | 60.4 (15.8) | 47.3 (8.5) | 37.0 (2.8) | 57.3 (14.1) |
| Daily mean °F (°C) | 24.0 (−4.4) | 25.8 (−3.4) | 33.9 (1.1) | 45.7 (7.6) | 57.3 (14.1) | 67.5 (19.7) | 72.2 (22.3) | 70.5 (21.4) | 63.3 (17.4) | 51.4 (10.8) | 39.6 (4.2) | 30.4 (−0.9) | 48.5 (9.2) |
| Mean daily minimum °F (°C) | 16.6 (−8.6) | 17.7 (−7.9) | 25.0 (−3.9) | 35.8 (2.1) | 47.5 (8.6) | 57.8 (14.3) | 62.4 (16.9) | 61.2 (16.2) | 53.9 (12.2) | 42.5 (5.8) | 31.9 (−0.1) | 23.8 (−4.6) | 39.7 (4.3) |
| Record low °F (°C) | −17 (−27) | −17 (−27) | −6 (−21) | 11 (−12) | 27 (−3) | 38 (3) | 44 (7) | 40 (4) | 32 (0) | 21 (−6) | 4 (−16) | −10 (−23) | −17 (−27) |
| Average precipitation inches (mm) | 2.09 (53) | 2.15 (55) | 2.55 (65) | 3.41 (87) | 3.86 (98) | 3.64 (92) | 3.38 (86) | 3.47 (88) | 3.31 (84) | 2.80 (71) | 2.79 (71) | 2.36 (60) | 35.81 (910) |
| Average snowfall inches (cm) | 9.4 (24) | 7.4 (19) | 3.5 (8.9) | 0.3 (0.76) | 0.0 (0.0) | 0.0 (0.0) | 0.0 (0.0) | 0.0 (0.0) | 0.0 (0.0) | 0.0 (0.0) | 0.4 (1.0) | 6.9 (18) | 27.9 (71) |
| Average precipitation days (≥ 0.01 in) | 10.7 | 8.3 | 8.4 | 11.3 | 11.9 | 10.7 | 10.0 | 9.4 | 8.9 | 10.1 | 9.5 | 10.5 | 119.7 |
| Average snowy days (≥ 0.1 in) | 5.2 | 4.3 | 1.9 | 0.3 | 0.0 | 0.0 | 0.0 | 0.0 | 0.0 | 0.1 | 0.6 | 3.2 | 15.5 |
Source: NOAA

== Economy ==
The largest employer in Grosse Pointe Farms is the Grosse Pointe Schools. The second largest employer is the Country Club of Detroit.

== Education ==
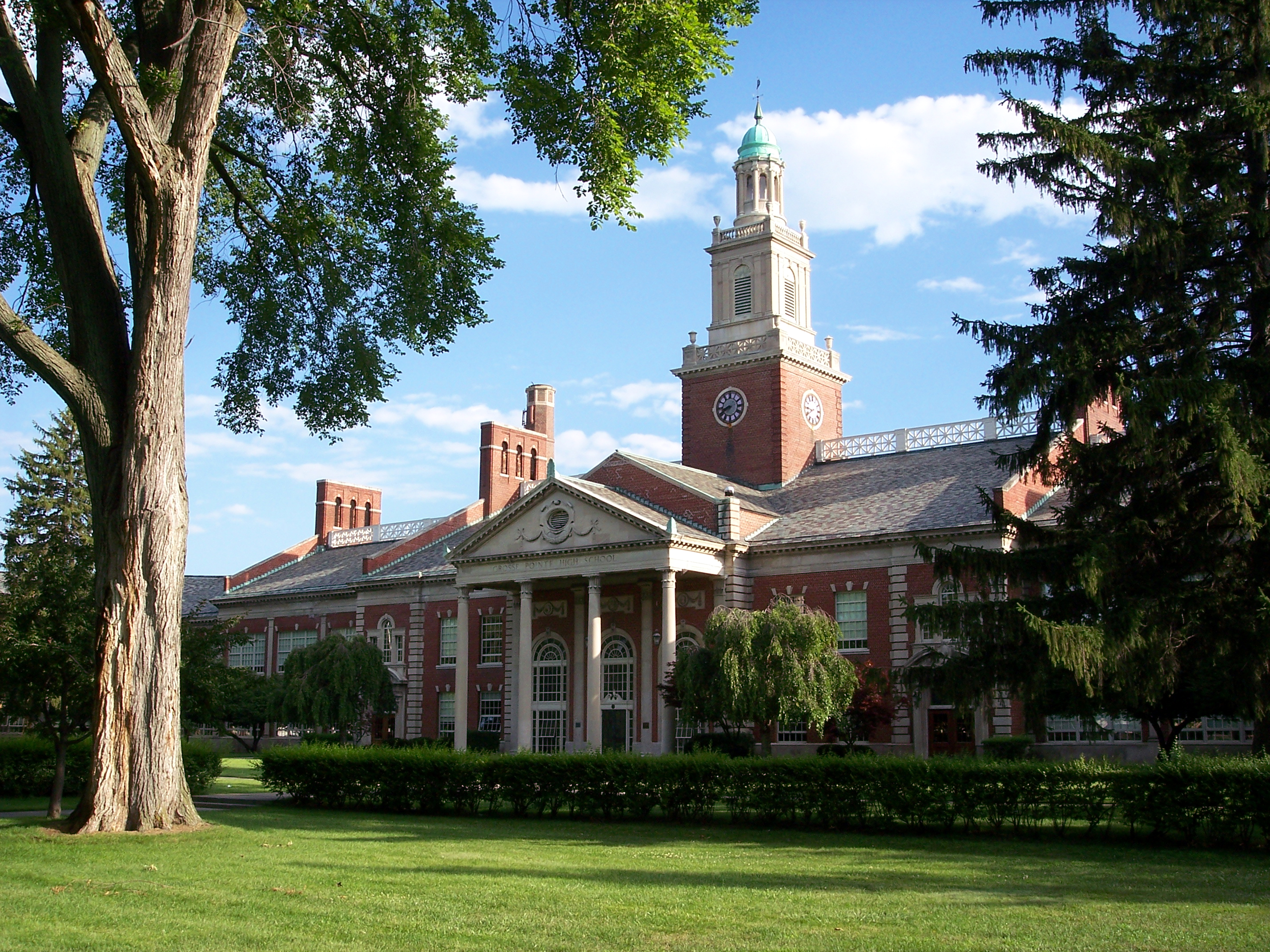
Grosse Pointe South High School

=== Primary and secondary schools ===
The community is served by Grosse Pointe Public Schools (GPPSS). Public schools within Grosse Pointe Farms include Père Gabriel Richard Elementary School, Kerby Elementary School, Brownell Middle School, and Grosse Pointe South High School. Along with Richard and Kerby, Monteith Elementary School in Grosse Pointe Woods serves a section of the city. All residents are zoned to Brownell. Almost all residents are zoned to GPS High, while those in a northwest section are zoned to Grosse Pointe North High School in Grosse Pointe Woods.

Saint Paul Catholic School is in Grosse Pointe Farms.

=== Public libraries ===
The Grosse Pointe Public Library operates the Central Branch in Grosse Pointe Farms.

== Notable people ==
- Anna Thompson Dodge, heiress and philanthropist, widow of Dodge automotive founder Horace Elgin Dodge, lived and died in Grosse Pointe Farms.
- Elena Ford, is the daughter of Charlotte Ford, granddaughter of Henry Ford II, and great, great-granddaughter of Henry Ford.
- Meg White of the White Stripes grew up in Grosse Pointe Farms, according to her former husband, Jack White.

== Images ==
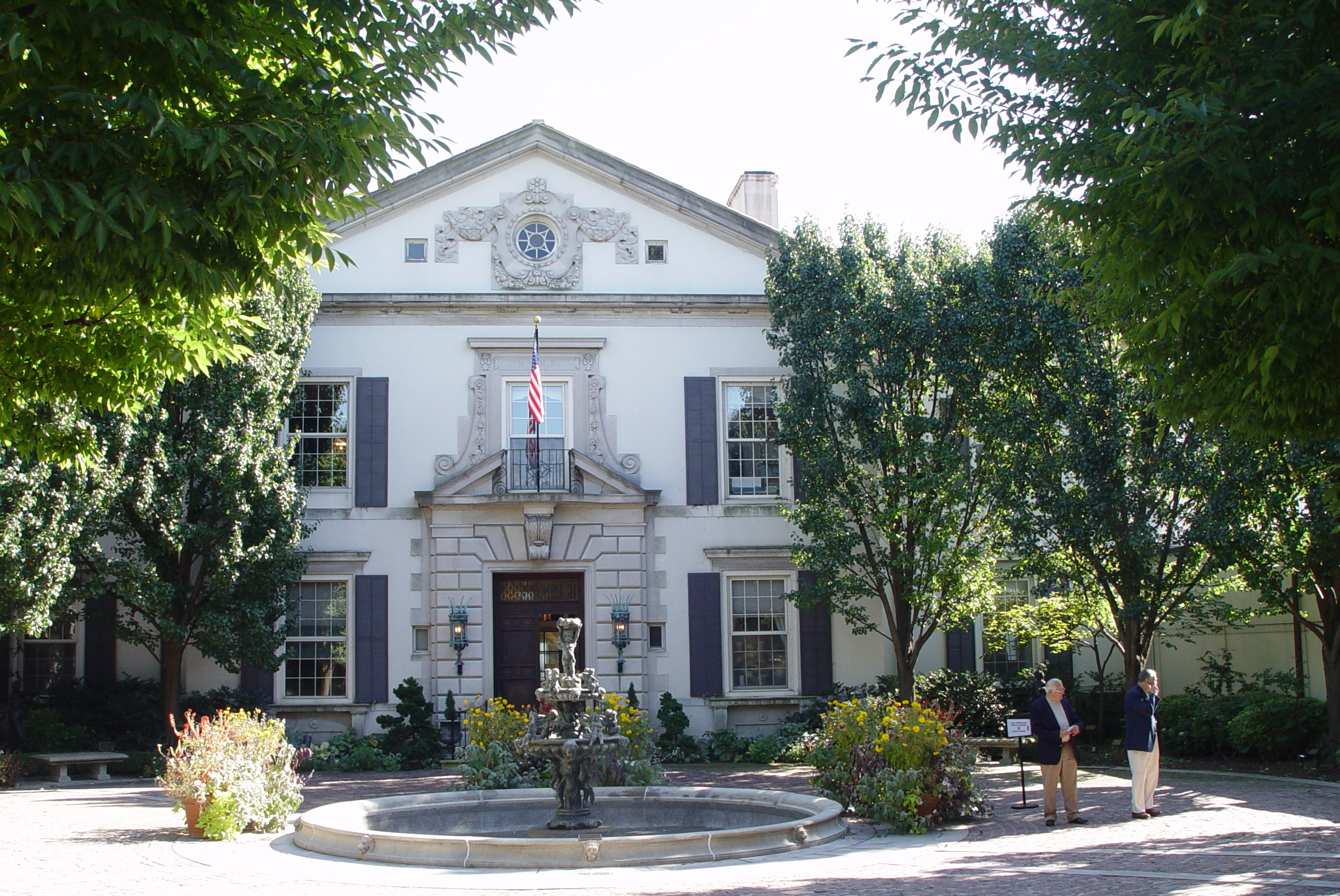
Grosse Pointe War Memorial

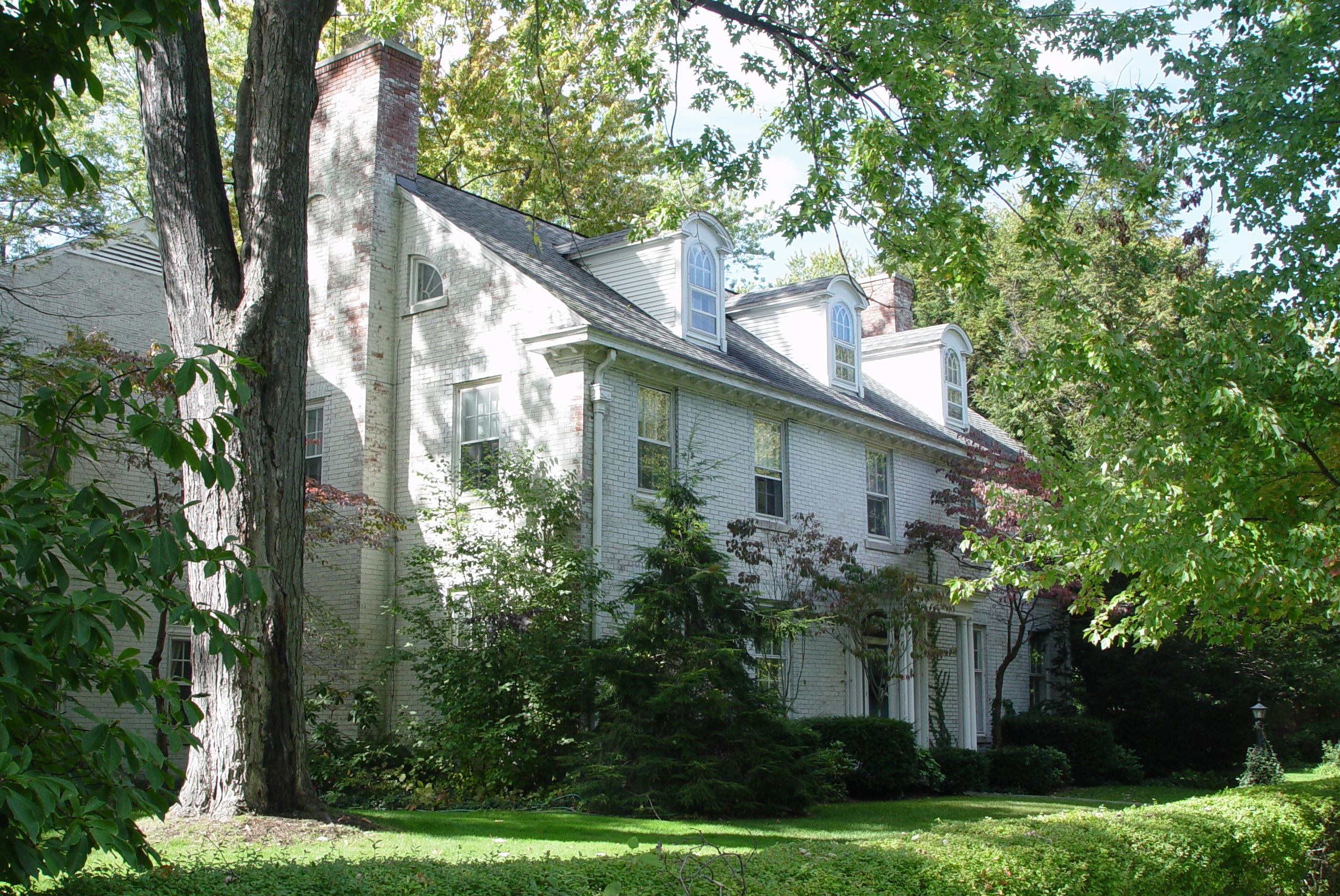
Beverly Road Historic District

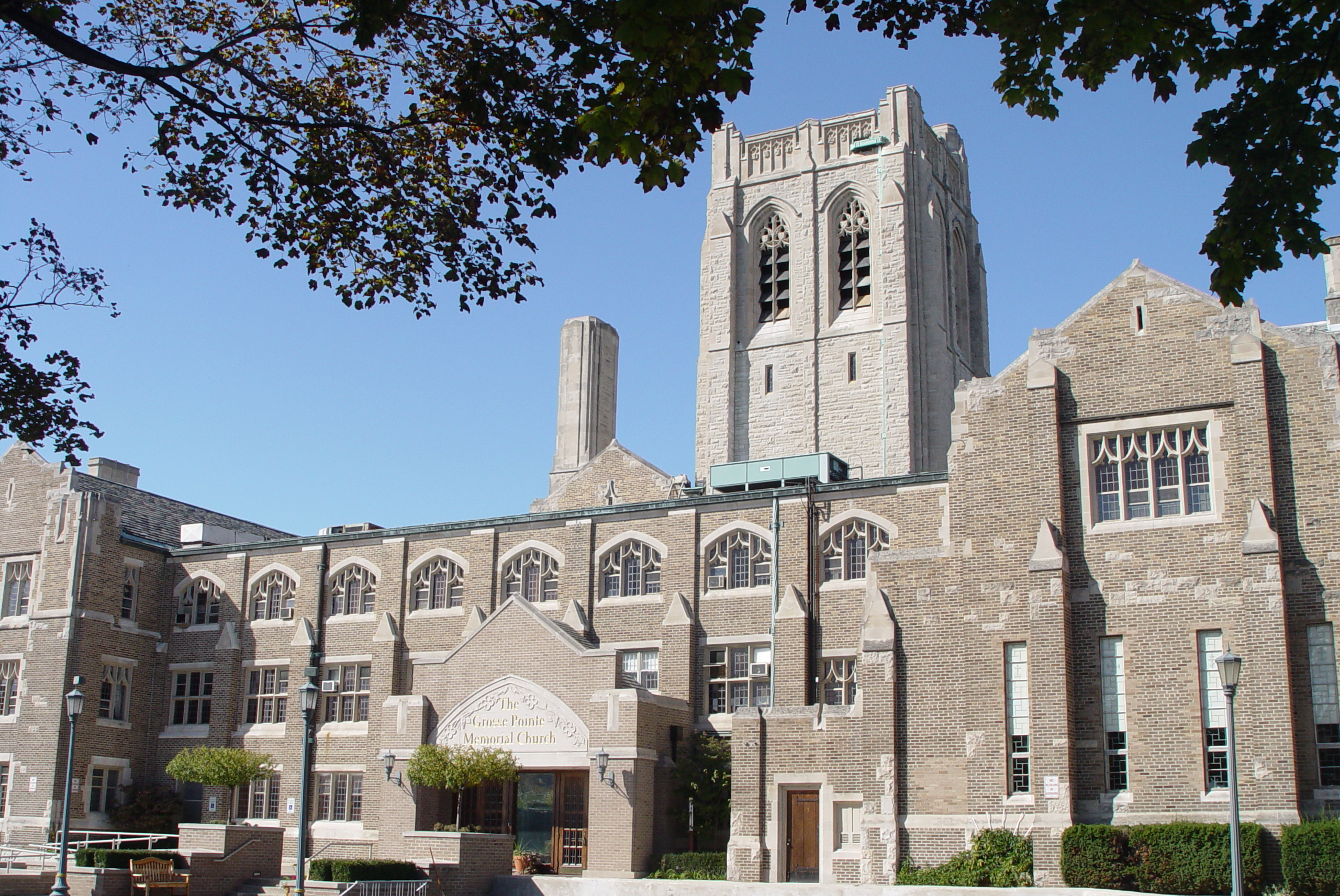
Grosse Pointe Memorial Church

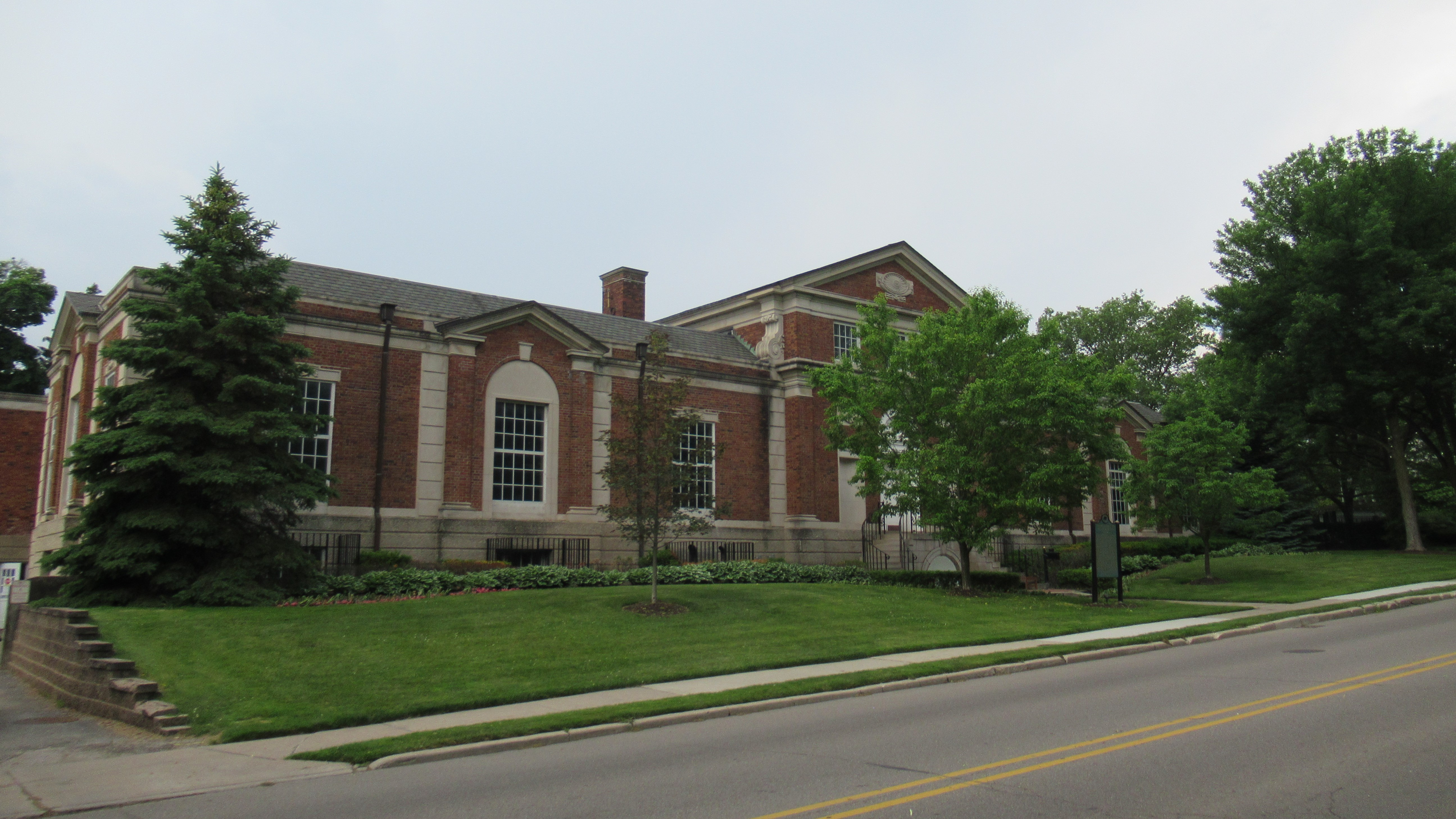
Water Filtration Plant

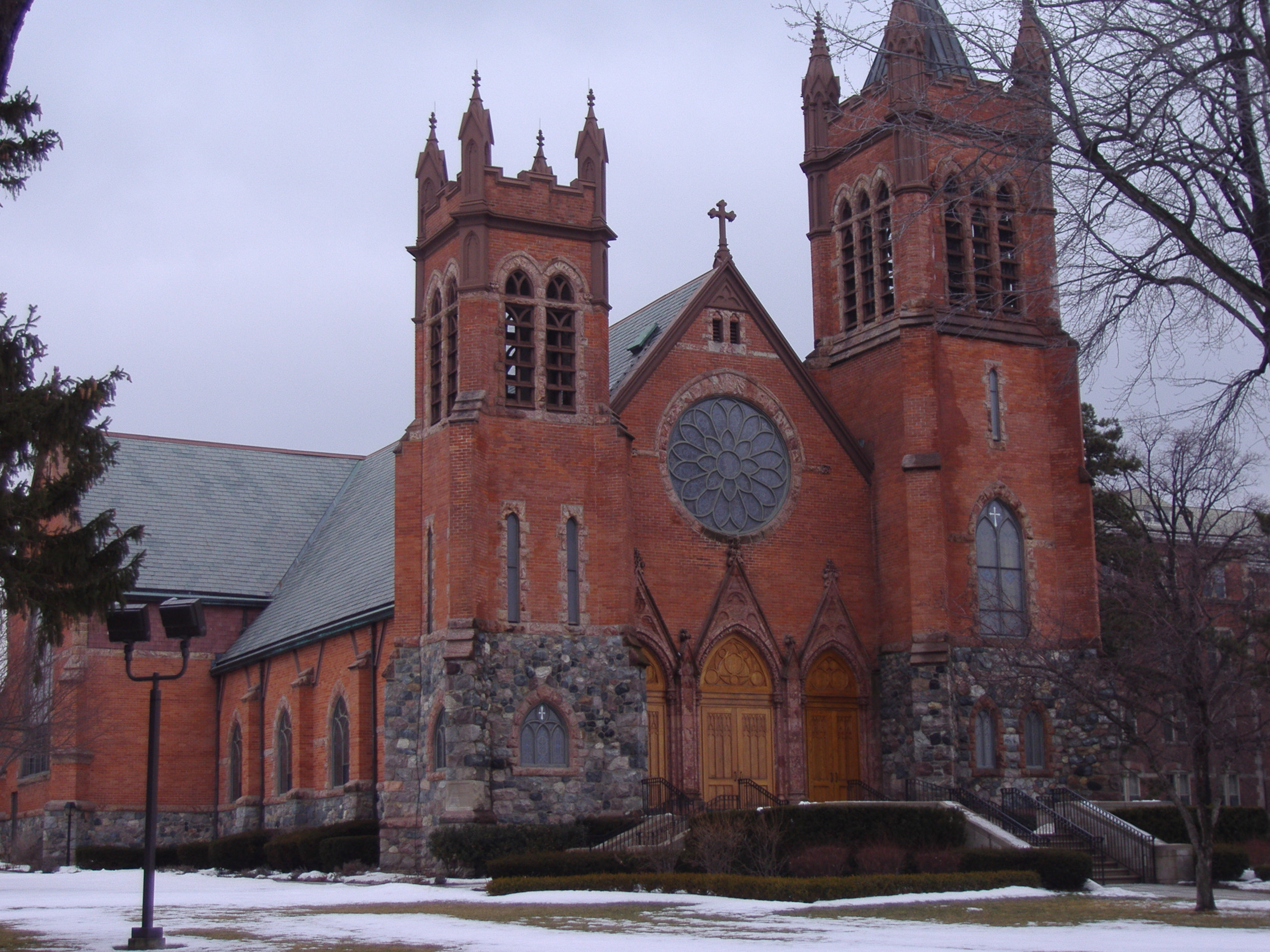
Saint Paul Catholic Church

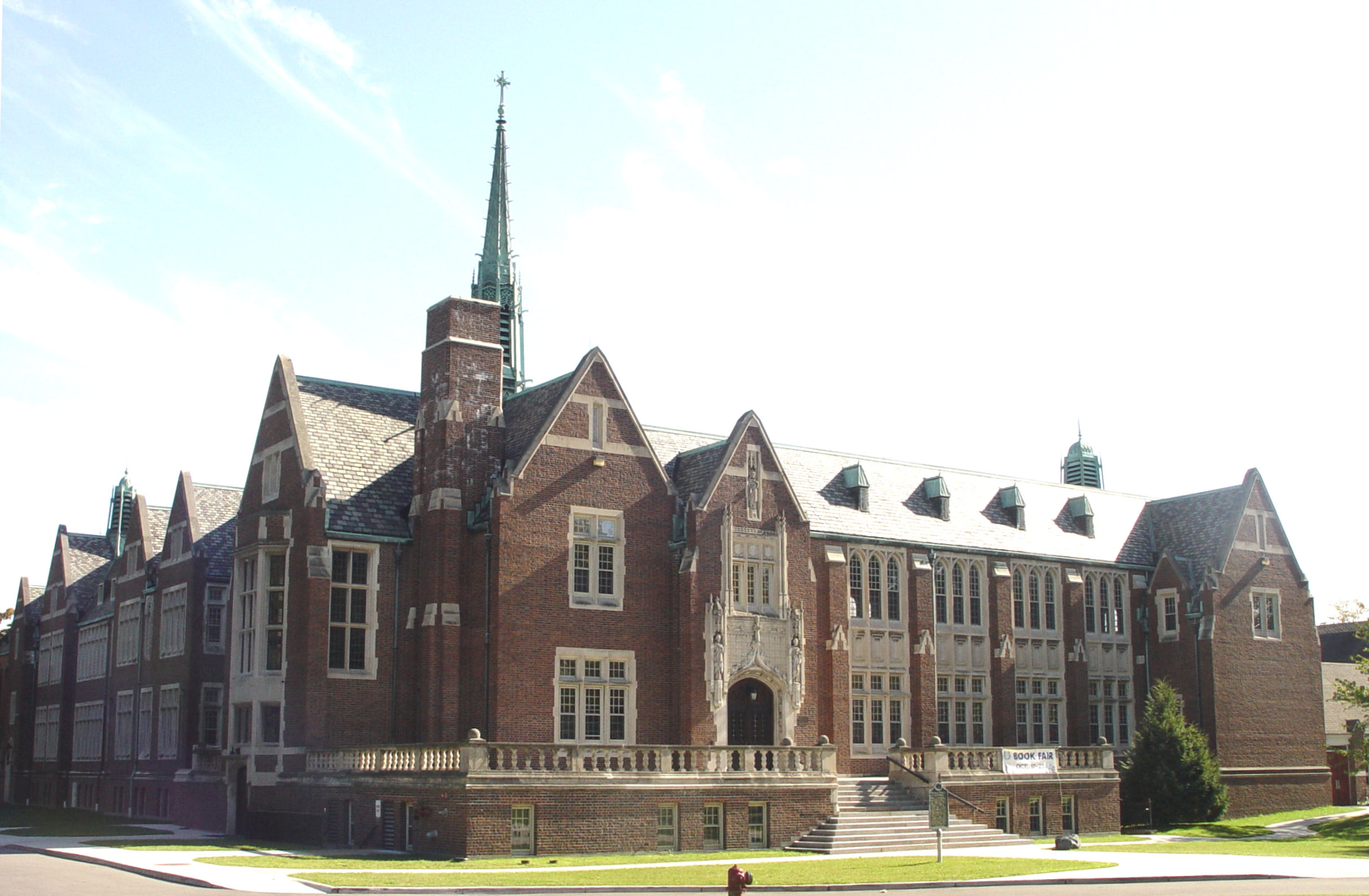
Grosse Pointe Academy
