= Grosse Pointe, Michigan =

- City
- City of Grosse Pointe
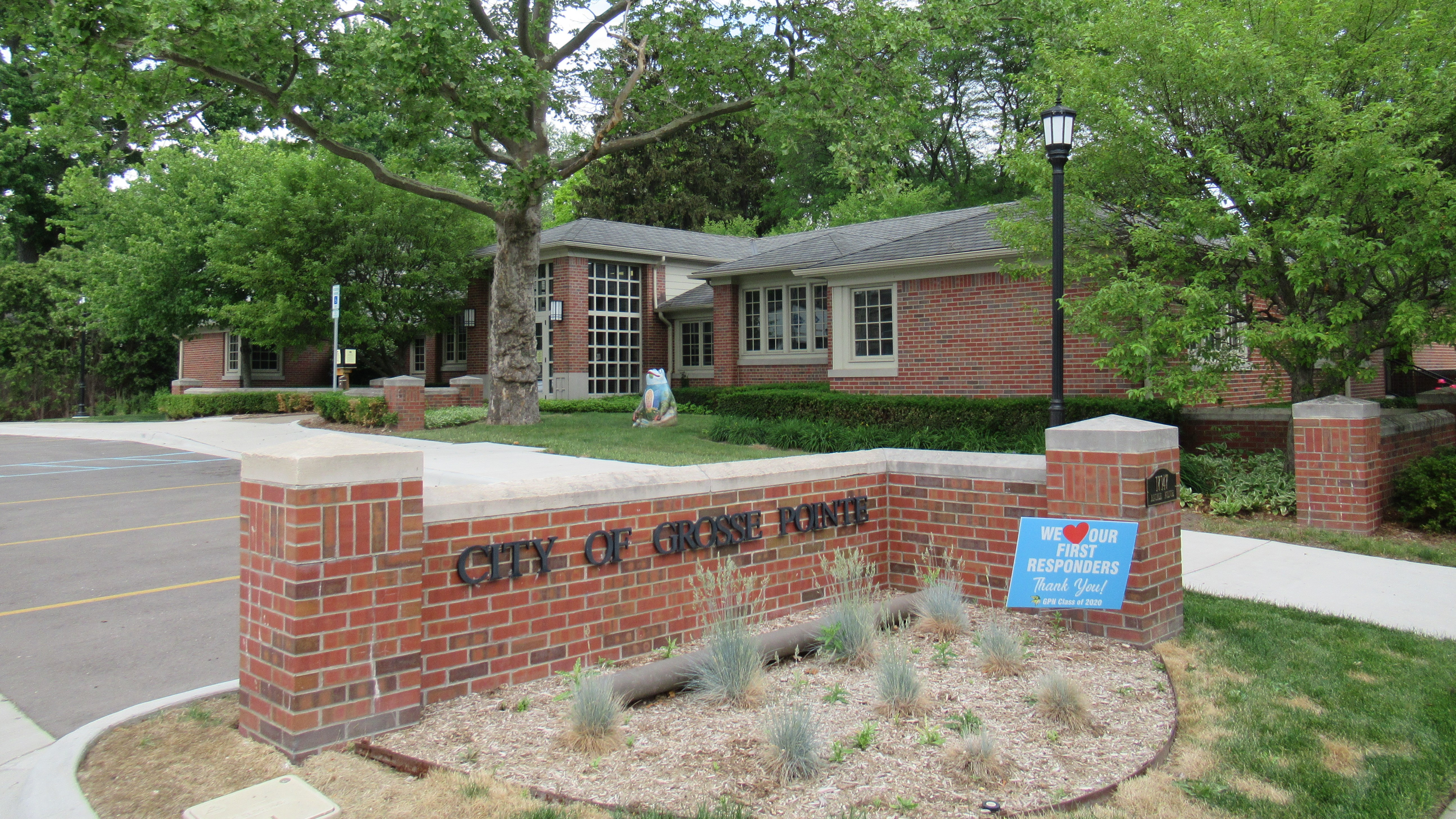
- Grosse Pointe City Hall

- Seal

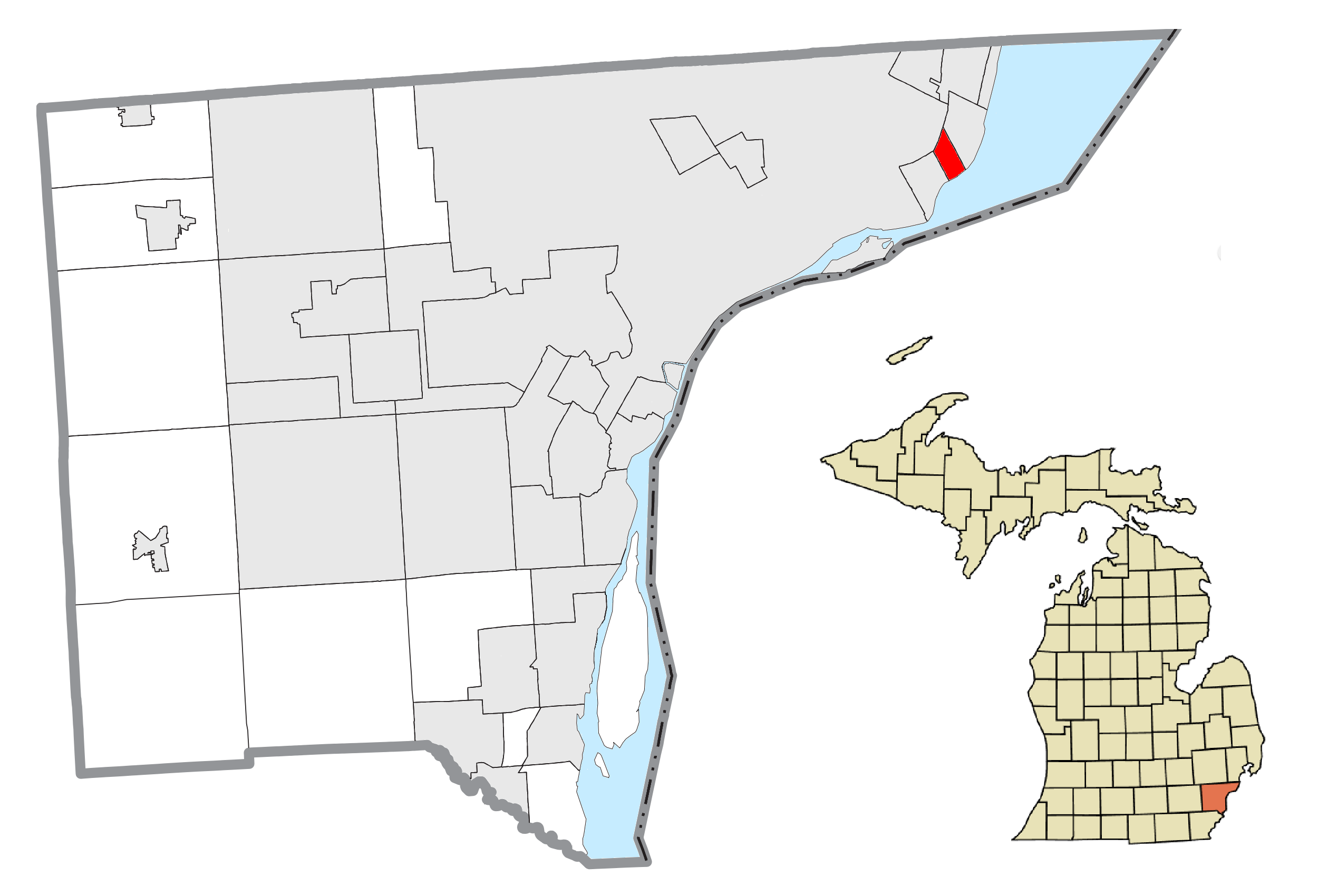
- Location of Grosse Pointe in Wayne County

- Location within the State of Michigan Location within the United States
- Coordinates: 42°23′00″N 82°55′00″W
- Country: United States
- State: Michigan
- County: Wayne
- Incorporated: 1880 (village); 1934 (city)

Government
  - Type: Mayor–council
  - Mayor: Sheila Tomkowiak (I)
  - Manager: Joseph A. Valentine
  - Clerk: Christopher Hardenbrook

Area
  - City: 2.25 sq mi (5.84 km^{2})
  - Land: 1.06 sq mi (2.75 km^{2})
  - Water: 1.19 sq mi (3.09 km^{2})
- Elevation: 587 ft (179 m)

Population (2020)
  - City: 5,678
  - Density: 5,346.6/sq mi (2,064.33/km^{2})
  - Metro: 4,285,832 (Metro Detroit)
- Time zone: UTC-5 (EST)
  - Summer (DST): UTC-4 (EDT)
- ZIP Codes: 48230, 48236
- Area code: 313
- FIPS code: 26-35480
- GNIS feature ID: 0627461
- Website: grossepointecity.org

Grosse Pointe is a city in Wayne County in the U.S. state of Michigan. One of the five "Grosse Pointe" suburbs of Detroit, the city of Grosse Pointe is located on the shore of Lake St. Clair and borders Detroit to the northeast, roughly 9 miles (14.5 km) east of downtown Detroit. As of the 2020 census, the city had a population of 5,678.

Grosse Pointe was originally incorporated as a village in 1880, and then as a city in 1934.

== History ==
It was incorporated as a city in 1934. There are five Grosse Pointes: Grosse Pointe Park, Grosse Pointe City, Grosse Pointe Farms, Grosse Pointe Woods, and Grosse Pointe Shores.

Together with Grosse Pointe Park and Grosse Pointe Farms, the city comprises part of the southern Pointes, which are older and more densely populated than the northern Pointes (Grosse Pointe Woods and Grosse Pointe Shores). It became heavily populated between 1910 and 1930 as one of Detroit's first commuter suburbs; in the previous century, Grosse Pointe was home to cottages, resorts, farms, and widely spaced lakefront mansions. Grosse Pointe ("the City"), Grosse Pointe Farms, and Grosse Pointe Park make up the Grosse Pointe South High School district. Grosse Pointe Woods and Grosse Pointe Shores make up the Grosse Pointe North High School district. Downtown Grosse Pointe, along Kercheval Avenue from Neff to Cadieux, nicknamed "The Village," is considered by many locals to be the central downtown for all five of the Grosse Pointes, although each of them (except Grosse Pointe Shores) has several blocks of retail properties.

== Geography ==
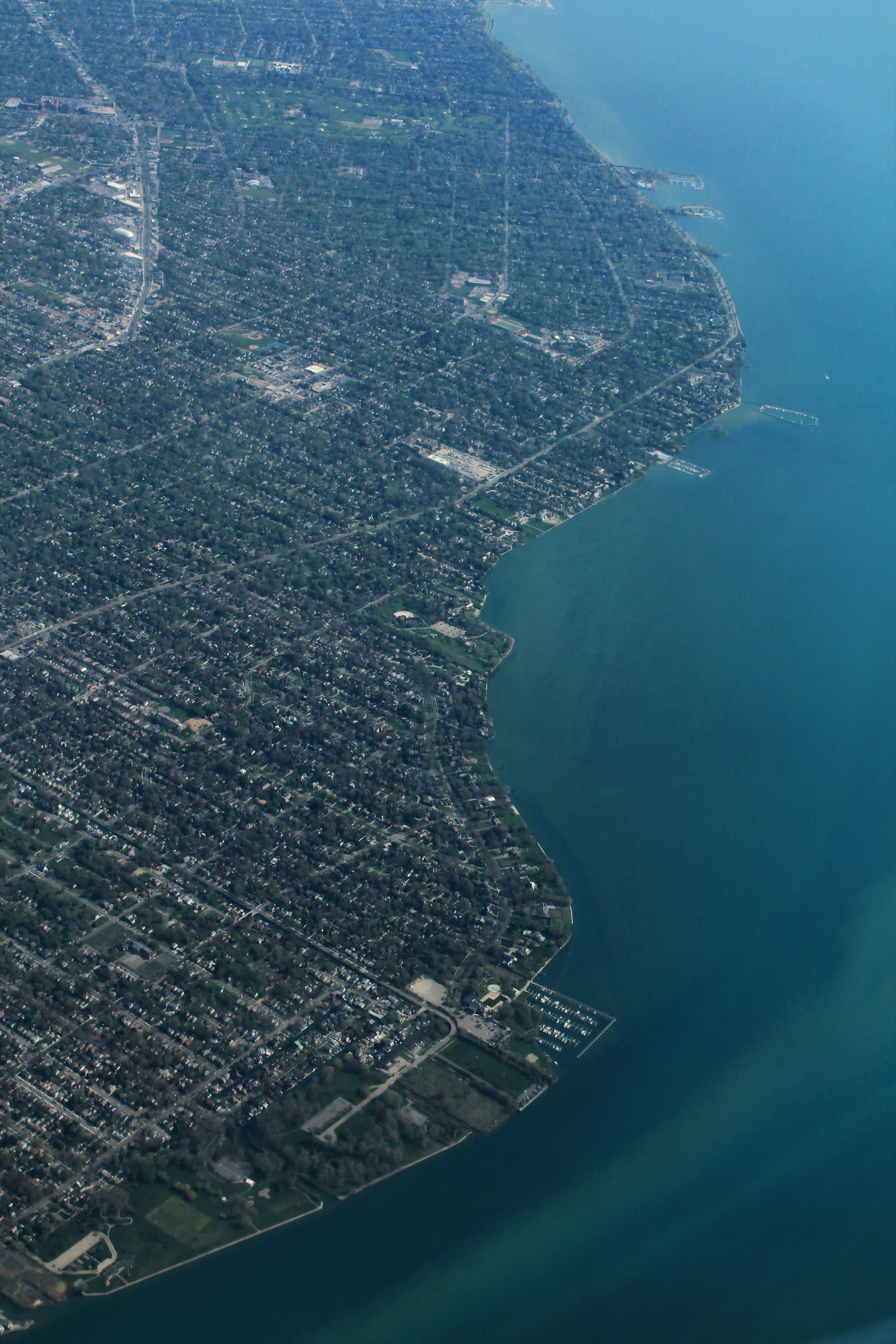
Aerial view of the Grosse Pointe shoreline

According to the United States Census Bureau, the city has a total area of 2.25 square miles (5.83 km^{2}), of which 1.06 square miles (2.75 km^{2}) is land and 1.19 square miles (3.08 km^{2}) is water. The water is part of Lake St. Clair.

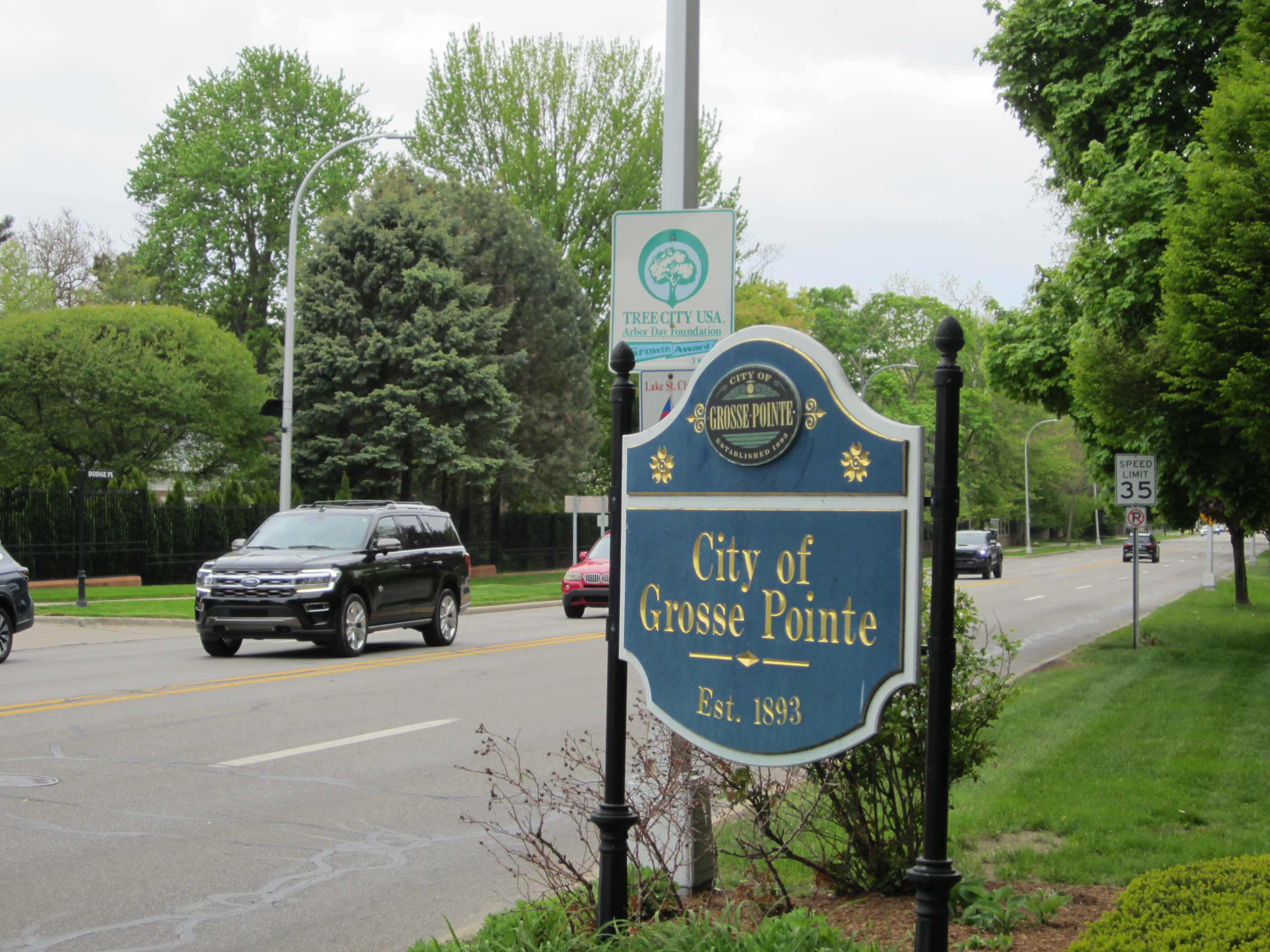
Jefferson Avenue at the border between Grosse Pointe and Grosse Pointe Farms

The street layout of Grosse Pointe is basically a grid inside of its Cadieux, Mack, and Fisher Road boundaries. Inside this small rectangle, most blocks contain rows of single-family homes built between 1910 and 1950, on parcels 50 feet (15 m) wide on average. Some streets offer large backyards, such as Washington and Lakeland, while other streets are more compact. In some areas, homes are configured in a traditionally urban, close-together fashion, while other nearby blocks may offer yards up to 150 feet (46 m) wide.

Home sizes and styles vary widely, from 1,500 to 12,000 square feet (140 to 1,110 m^{2}), but slightly under 3,000 square feet (280 m^{2}) on average. Most of the largest homes are within a few blocks of the lakefront; there are several blocks of mansions south of Kercheval Avenue. Predominant architecture includes the neo-Georgian, Tudor Revival, Dutch Colonial, and arts and crafts styles. Some Victorian homes and traditional bungalow homes can also be found, mostly just north and south of the Village retail district. Some blocks, generally just south of the Village, have townhouses and apartments. Most of these were built in the 1920s, and can be seen along St. Paul, Maumee, and Jefferson avenues, mostly west of Rivard Boulevard, and between Notre Dame and Cadieux south of the Village retail district.

There are retail and low-rise office buildings along Kercheval Avenue in the Village district, on Fisher Road near Grosse Pointe South High School, and along Mack Avenue bordering Detroit.

== Climate ==
This climatic region is typified by large seasonal temperature differences, with warm to hot (and often humid) summers and cold (sometimes severely cold) winters. According to the Köppen Climate Classification system, Grosse Pointe has a humid continental climate, abbreviated "Dfb" on climate maps.

== Demographics ==
=== Racial and ethnic composition ===
Grosse Pointe, Michigan – Racial and ethnic composition Note: the US Census treats Hispanic/Latino as an ethnic category. This table excludes Latinos from the racial categories and assigns them to a separate category. Hispanics/Latinos may be of any race.
Race / Ethnicity (NH = Non-Hispanic)	Pop 2000	Pop 2010	Pop 2020	% 2000	% 2010	% 2020
White alone (NH)	5,449	4,973	5,087	96.10%	91.74%	89.59%
Black or African American alone (NH)	44	176	180	0.78%	3.25%	3.17%
Native American or Alaska Native alone (NH)	4	6	13	0.07%	0.11%	0.23%
Asian alone (NH)	59	83	86	1.04%	1.53%	1.51%
Native Hawaiian or Pacific Islander alone (NH)	1	5	0	0.02%	0.09%	0.00%
Other race alone (NH)	0	4	2	0.00%	0.07%	0.04%
Mixed race or Multiracial (NH)	30	76	154	0.53%	1.40%	2.71%
Hispanic or Latino (any race)	83	98	156	1.46%	1.81%	2.75%
Total	5,670	5,421	5,678	100.00%	100.00%	100.00%

Historical population
Census	Pop.	Note	%±
1880	189		—
1890	298		57.7%
1900	343		15.1%
1910	830		142.0%
1920	2,084		151.1%
1930	5,173		148.2%
1940	6,179		19.4%
1950	6,283		1.7%
1960	6,631		5.5%
1970	6,637		0.1%
1980	5,901		−11.1%
1990	5,681		−3.7%
2000	5,670		−0.2%
2010	5,421		−4.4%
2020	5,678		4.7%
U.S. Decennial Census

=== 2020 census ===
As of the 2020 census, Grosse Pointe had a population of 5,678. The median age was 44.9 years. 21.8% of residents were under the age of 18 and 20.2% of residents were 65 years of age or older. For every 100 females there were 92.9 males, and for every 100 females age 18 and over there were 88.7 males age 18 and over.

100.0% of residents lived in urban areas, while 0.0% lived in rural areas.

There were 2,293 households in Grosse Pointe, of which 29.5% had children under the age of 18 living in them. Of all households, 55.0% were married-couple households, 14.6% were households with a male householder and no spouse or partner present, and 27.3% were households with a female householder and no spouse or partner present. About 28.9% of all households were made up of individuals and 15.7% had someone living alone who was 65 years of age or older.

There were 2,429 housing units, of which 5.6% were vacant. The homeowner vacancy rate was 0.7% and the rental vacancy rate was 6.8%.

=== 2010 census ===
As of the census of 2010, there were 5,421 people, 2,236 households, and 1,481 families residing in the city. The population density was 5,114.2 inhabitants per square mile (1,974.6/km^{2}). There were 2,446 housing units at an average density of 2,307.5 per square mile (890.9/km^{2}). The racial makeup of the city was 93.2% White, 3.3% African American, 0.1% Native American, 1.6% Asian, 0.1% Pacific Islander, 0.2% from other races, and 1.5% from two or more races. Hispanic or Latino of any race were 1.8% of the population.

There were 2,236 households, of which 33.0% had children under the age of 18 living with them, 54.9% were married couples living together, 8.9% had a female householder with no husband present, 2.4% had a male householder with no wife present, and 33.8% were non-families. 30.2% of all households were made up of individuals, and 14% had someone living alone who was 65 years of age or older. The average household size was 2.42 and the average family size was 3.06.

The median age in the city was 44.7 years. Residents under the age of 18 were 26.4% of the city's population; 4.9% were between the ages of 18 and 24; 19.3% were from 25 to 44; 33.4% were from 45 to 64; and 16.1% were 65 years of age or older. The gender makeup of the city was 46.4% male and 53.6% female.

=== 2000 census ===
As of the census of 2000, there were 5,670 people, 2,388 households, and 1,559 families residing in the city. The population density was 5,297.9 inhabitants per square mile (2,045.5/km^{2}). There were 2,504 housing units at an average density of 2,339.7 per square mile (903.4/km^{2}). The racial makeup of the city was 97.18% White, 0.79% African American, 0.07% Native American, 1.04% Asian, 0.02% Pacific Islander, 0.30% from other races, and 0.60% from two or more races. Hispanic or Latino of any race were 1.46% of the population. 19.9% were of German, 14.8% Irish, 13.9% English, 7.8% Polish and 7.2% Italian ancestry according to Census 2000. The largest reported religious affiliation was Roman Catholic.

There were 2,388 households, out of which 30.8% had children under the age of 18 living with them, 56.7% were married couples living together, 7.1% had a female householder with no husband present, and 34.7% were non-families. 31.1% of all households were made up of individuals, and 13.8% had someone living alone who was 65 years of age or older. The average household size was 2.37 and the average family size was 3.02.

In the city, the population was spread out, with 25.4% under the age of 18, 4.3% from 18 to 24, 25.3% from 25 to 44, 29.3% from 45 to 64, and 15.7% who were 65 years of age or older. The median age was 42 years. For every 100 females, there were 88.1 males. For every 100 females age 18 and over, there were 83.2 males.

The median income for a household in the city was $89,492, and the median income for a family was $101,889. Males had a median income of $79,637 versus $44,167 for females. The per capita income for the city was $53,942. About 2.2% of families and 5.8% of the population were below the poverty line, including 1.3% of those under age 18 and 1.9% of those age 65 or over.

== Downtown development ==
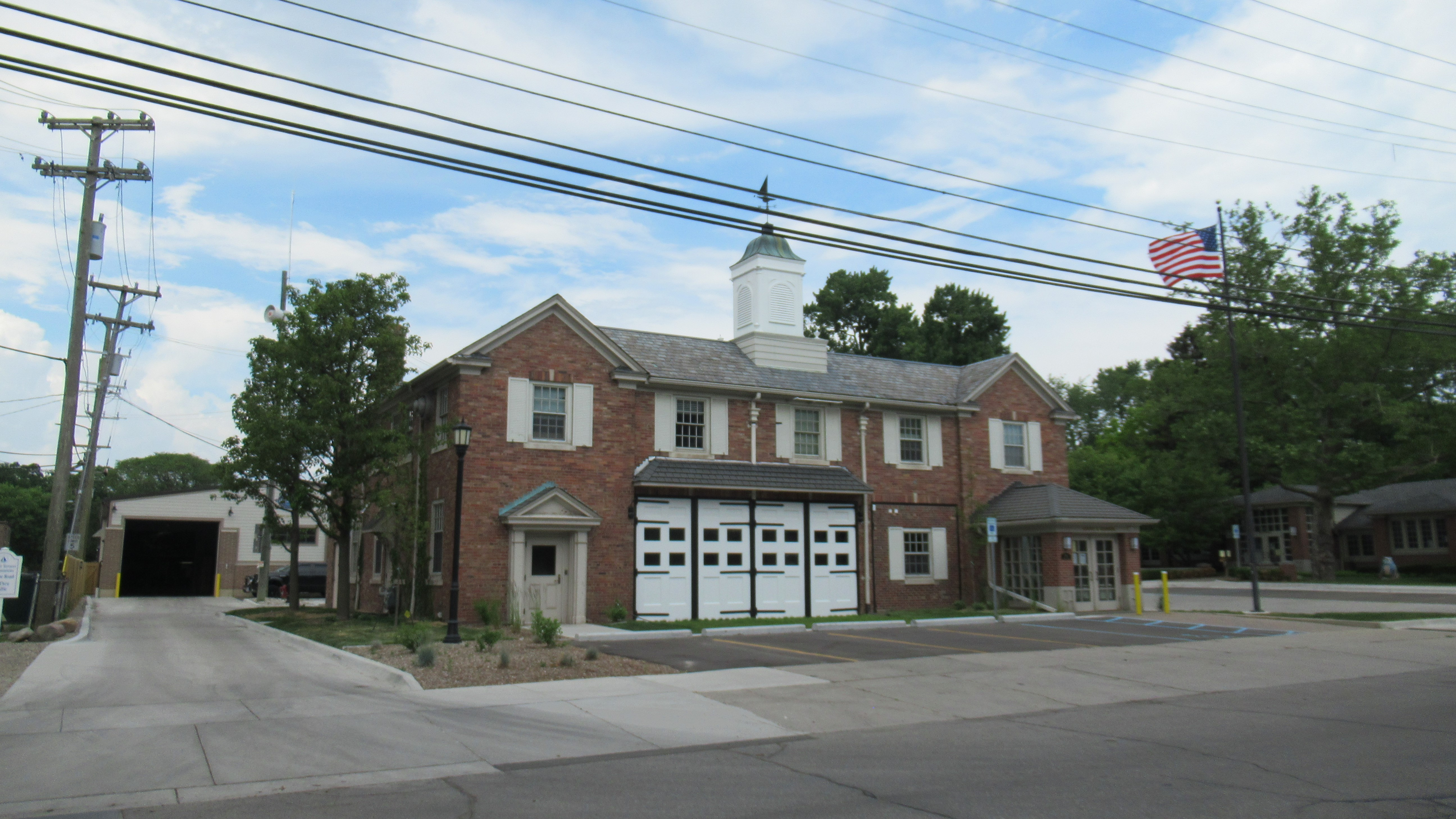
Grosse Pointe Police Department and Courthouse

The City's Master Plan permits additional growth in downtown Grosse Pointe, also known as "The Village", allowing an expansion of the shopping- and amenities-focused district. In particular, two lots (on either side of St. Clair Avenue) currently used for municipal parking directly north of the current row of retail are the focus of planned development.

The former Jacobson's Department Store building along Kercheval, west of St. Clair, has been completely redeveloped. Upper-floor office space accompanies a slate of new retailers, including a Trader Joe's grocery occupying specialized space in the renovated building. In addition, a new building rose in 2011 to replace the former Kroger grocery store at the corner of Kercheval and Notre Dame Street.

== Education ==
Grosse Pointe Public School System operates public schools.

Lewis Maire Elementary School in Grosse Pointe and Pierce Middle School in Grosse Pointe Park serve the western half of the city, while Père Gabriel Richard Elementary School and Brownell Middle School, both in Grosse Pointe Farms, serve the other half. All residents are zoned to Grosse Pointe South High School in Grosse Pointe Farms. Grosse Pointe Woods and Grosse Pointe Shores attend Grosse Pointe North High School

The Grosse Pointes are also home to one of the state's top private/independent schools, University Liggett School in Grosse Pointe Woods. Liggett serves grades prekindergarten through 12th grade. Liggett is known for its progressive curriculum, starting with the Reggio Emilia approach in prekindergarten and lower school grades.

== Notable places ==
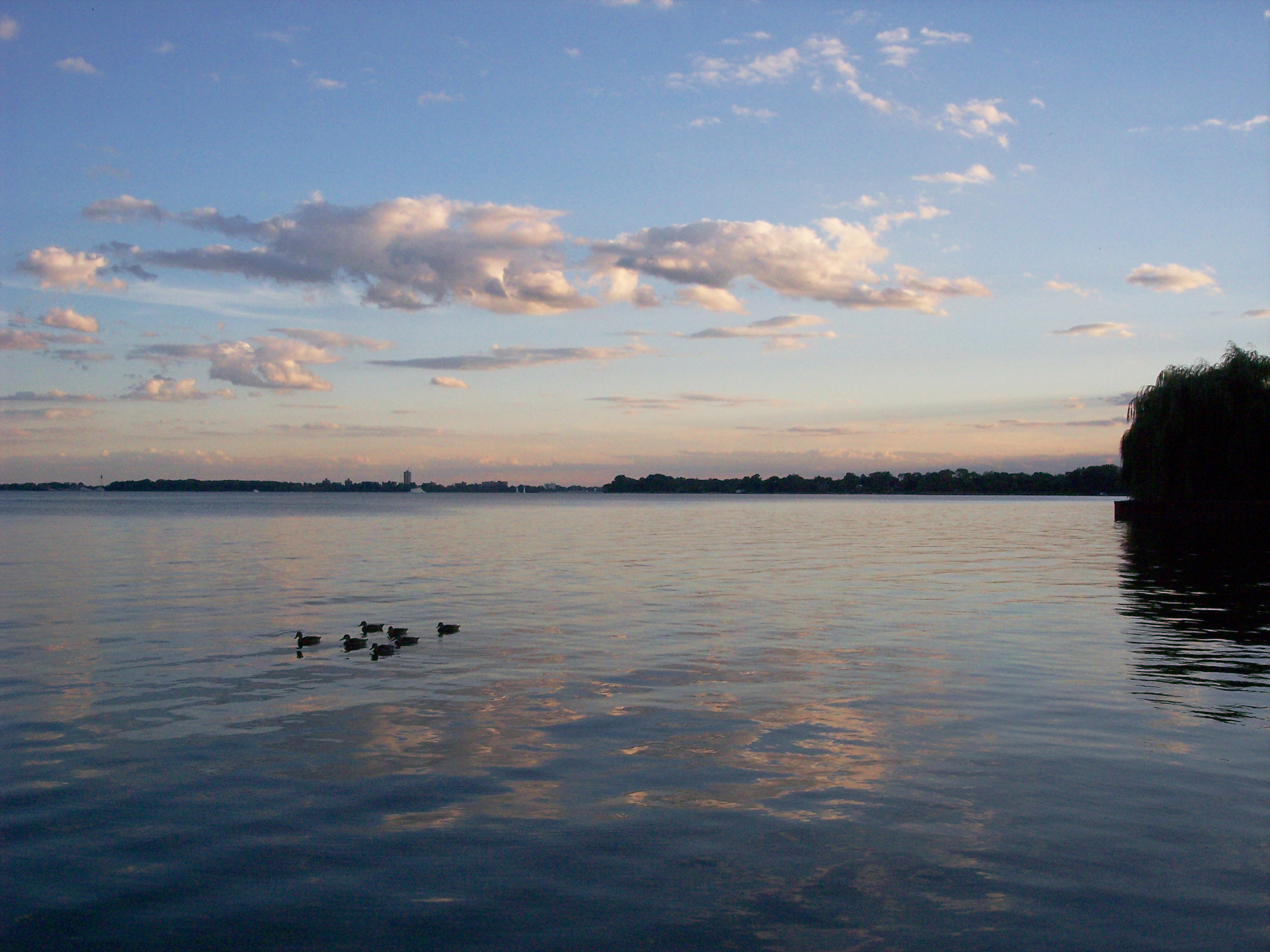
The Grosse Pointe waterfront along Lake St. Clair at Neff Park

- Neff Park, at the foot of University Place. A restricted-access park with pier and harbor on southern Lake St. Clair, pool, playgrounds, picnic areas, volleyball courts, and ice-skating in the winter.
- George Elworthy Field. A city park with tennis courts, pickleball courts, sports fields (including Little League Baseball diamonds), and playgrounds, within walking distance of the Village. Bounded by Neff Rd., St. Clair Ave., Waterloo St., and Charlevoix Street.
- Ralph Harmon Booth House, 315 Washington Road. The largest house in the city; an architecturally significant English Revival mansion, designed by Marcus Burrows, in the midst of other historic homes. The former home of the President of Booth Newspapers, who served as U.S. Minister to Denmark and a key Detroit Institute of Arts philanthropist, Ralph Booth, the brother of George G. Booth.
- Henry Tiffany Cole House, 394 Lakeland at Maumee. A large, distinctive Tudor mansion.
- John M. Dwyer House, 372 Lakeland. A huge Georgian Colonial mansion, part of a row of mansions on lower Lakeland Ave.
- Waterman House, 330 Lincoln. A stucco Georgian mansion built in 1911 at the corner of Maumee. Features a chapel imported from England.
- The Murray Sales House, 251 Lincoln. An Italian villa in white stucco off Jefferson Avenue built-in 1917. Designed by the famed Louis Kamper, the architect of some downtown Detroit skyscrapers, among other buildings.
- "Rosecroft", the B. Tobin House, at 266 Lakeland Ave. A unique 1912 Tudor designed by Albert Kahn.
- "Woodley Green", the Benson Ford House, on the shore of Lake St. Clair. A notable 1934 Georgian/Regency designed by Hugh T. Keyes.
- Several blocks of mansions and architecturally significant houses (including some townhouses) on Lincoln, Washington, Roosevelt, Rivard, University, and Lakeland, south of Kercheval.
- Historic smaller homes, among the oldest in the city, along St. Clair Ave. and Notre Dame Ave., especially near Kercheval.
- Several blocks of houses representing the upscale residential architecture of the 1910–1930 period.
- Dodge Place, a mid-century subdivision built on part of the former Horace and Anna Dodge mansion(s) site.
- Fisher Road retail district (between St. Paul and Maumee), across from Grosse Pointe South High School.
- Mack Avenue business district, along the length of Mack Avenue in Grosse Pointe, constituting the border with Detroit.
- Maire Elementary School (Cadieux near Kercheval), the only one of the Grosse Pointe Public Schools within the city.
- Grosse Pointe Unitarian Church (Maumee near Neff), the only church within the one square mile city.

== Notable people ==
- Gregg Alexander, singer, frontman of the New Radicals
- Anita Baker, singer, winner of eight Grammys
- Kevin Barnes, singer-songwriter for Of Montreal
- Edward A. Batchelor, early 20th Century journalist, resided in Grosse Pointe
- Miguel Cabrera, MLB player for Florida Marlins and Detroit Tigers
- Roy D. Chapin Jr., chairman and CEO of American Motors Company
- Antonio Cipriano, American actor and singer
- Laura Devon, actress
- Jeffrey Eugenides, Pulitzer-Prize winning author, attended University Liggett School
- Edsel Ford, automaker, resided and died in Grosse Pointe Shores
- Edsel Ford II, automaker, resides in Grosse Pointe Farms
- Elena Ford, auto executive, granddaughter of Henry Ford II, resides in Grosse Pointe Farms
- Henry Ford II, auto executive, lived in Grosse Pointe
- Martha Firestone Ford, principal owner and chairwoman of the Detroit Lions of the National Football League (NFL), widow of William Clay Ford Sr., and daughter of Harvey S. Firestone Jr.
- William Clay Ford Sr., principal owner and chairman of the Detroit Lions of the National Football League (NFL), resided and died in Grosse Pointe Shores
- Chris Getz, professional baseball player, Toronto Blue Jays
- Kirk Gibson, MLB player for Detroit Tigers and Los Angeles Dodgers, former manager of Arizona Diamondbacks, resides in Grosse Pointe
- Jared Lee Gosselin, Grammy-winning music producer
- Julie Harris, actress, Emmy, Tony and Grammy Award winner and Oscar nominee, born in Grosse Pointe
- Edward Herrmann, actor, attended Grosse Pointe High School
- Hal Hudson, professional baseball pitcher, Chicago White Sox and St. Louis Browns
- John Hughes, American film director, producer, and screenwriter famous for numerous films including Home Alone, Ferris Bueller's Day Off, Sixteen Candles, grew up in Grosse Pointe
- Julanne Johnston, silent-film actress
- Maya Joint, professional tennis player
- Bill Kennedy, actor, TV Talk Show Host (Bill Kennedy at the Movies, channel 50, 1pm, in the 60's thru 80's), resided in Grosse Pointe
- Aaron Krickstein, professional tennis player
- David Legwand, NHL hockey player
- Matt Letscher, actor
- Lisa LoCicero, actress, General Hospital
- John Lowery, guitarist for Mötley Crüe, Rob Zombie, David Lee Roth, Marilyn Manson, Rob Halford's 2wo, and K.d. lang, among others
- Debbie Massey, LPGA Tour golfer, twice winner of Women's British Open, born in Grosse Pointe
- Michael McCarron, professional ice hockey player
- Jim Miller, former NFL quarterback
- Carly Piper, swimmer, gold medalist at 2004 Athens Olympics
- Michael Quatro, Prog-rock keyboardist and 60s rock promoter
- Suzi Quatro, Rock bassist and actress from Happy Days
- J.K. Simmons, actor, Academy Award winner for Whiplash, born in Grosse Pointe
- Geralin Thomas, organizer, consultant
- Mark Tremonti, guitarist for Creed and Alter Bridge
- Corey Tropp, NHL hockey player
- Zach Werenski, Hockey player in the Columbus Blue Jackets organization, gold medalist at the 2026 Milan-Cortina Olympics
- Meg White, drummer of the White Stripes
- Armani Williams, racing driver
- Ralph Wilson, owner of the Buffalo Bills, resided and died in Grosse Pointe Shores

== In popular culture ==
In the 1990s CBS television series, Northern Exposure, the lead character Maggie O'Connell was a rugged bush pilot living in a remote log cabin, but had been raised in a privileged family in Grosse Pointe. In S4, E14, Maggie and Joel visit her family in an episode entitled "Grosse Pointe, 48230."

The 1993 book The Virgin Suicides (and the 1999 film of the same name) were about a 1970s era white family in Grosse Pointe. The book was written by Jeffrey Eugenides. The film was directed by Sofia Coppola and starred Kirsten Dunst.

In the 1997 film, Grosse Pointe Blank, John Cusack plays an LA-based hitman who grew up in Grosse Pointe. After going to Detroit for a job, he returns to his hometown for a class reunion.

In 2000, there was a short-lived TV series on the WB network called Grosse Pointe. It was created by Darren Star and the ensemble cast included Irene Molloy, Al Santos and Joely Fisher. The series often featured appearances by actors from other Darren Star series including Sarah Michelle Gellar, Kristin Davis and Jason Priestley. The series was a show within a show, focusing on the actors in a TV show that was set in an affluent Detroit suburb but mimicked the characters of Aaron Spelling's hit, Beverly Hills 90210. Grosse Pointe only lasted one season with 17 episodes.

Grosse Pointe Garden Society was a 2025 NBC series that lasted one season. It revolved around four suburban people who share a murderous secret. It received favorable reviews from critics.

In the final scene of the movie Gran Torino (2008) the character Thao is seen driving the 1972 Ford Torino along Lakeshore Drive, also known as Jefferson Avenue.

== See also ==
- Grosse Pointe Yacht Club
- Lake St. Clair
- Grosse Pointe Blank
- Grosse Pointe Garden Society
