= Murder of Jane Bashara =

American homicide victim

- Location: Detroit, Michigan, U.S.
- Date: 24 January 2012; 14 years ago
- Attack type: Murder-for-hire; Homicide by strangulation
- Deaths: 1
- Victims: Jane E. Bashara, aged 56
- Perpetrators: Bob Bashara; Joseph Gentz
- Convictions: First-degree murder (Bashara); Second-degree murder (Gentz)

The murder of Jane Bashara prompted a widely publicized investigation into the circumstances of her death. Bashara was a marketing executive and a resident of Grosse Pointe Park, Michigan. On January 24, 2012, she was found dead in the back seat of her abandoned Mercedes-Benz SUV in an alley in Detroit, Michigan. The cause of death was strangulation.

Law enforcement officials named Bashara's husband, Bob Bashara, as a person of interest. Joseph Gentz, a mentally impaired handyman, was arrested in March 2012 and charged with first-degree murder after reportedly telling police that Bob Bashara had paid him between $2,000 and $8,000 and an old Cadillac to murder his wife. Bob Bashara was arraigned on first-degree murder charges in the death of his wife on May 1, 2013. Convicted, Bob Bashara was sentenced to life without parole by Wayne County Circuit Court Judge Vonda Evans. She denied post trial motions for relief from judgment, a decision that was affirmed by the Michigan Supreme Court.

== Background ==
At the time of her death, Jane E. Bashara was a 56-year-old senior marketing manager for KEMA Services, an energy consulting and testing company in Detroit. She was a native of Mt. Clemens, Michigan, and held bachelor's and master's degrees in business administration from Central Michigan University and the University of Detroit Mercy. She had two children and had served as a past president of the Grosse Pointe South High School Mother's Club.

Bashara's husband, Bob Bashara, was a businessman who, at the time of the incident, owned and managed multiple rental properties. He was known as a philanthropist in Grosse Pointe and served for a time as the president of the Grosse Pointe Rotary Club. Bob Bashara is the son of George Bashara, a state appellate court judge and member of the Board of Governors at Wayne State University. The Basharas had been married for 26 years at the time of Jane Bashara's death.

== Bashara's death ==
Jane Bashara was last seen by co-workers on the afternoon of January 24, 2012, after a meeting in downtown Detroit. Her husband filed a missing person report with the Grosse Pointe Park Police Department at about 11:30 p.m.

On January 25, 2012, Bashara's body was discovered in the backseat of her Mercedes SUV, which was parked in an alley on the east side of Detroit. A tow truck driver discovered the body at 7:00 a.m. while patrolling for stolen vehicles. Police reported that Bashara had died from strangulation and that she had bruises and broken finger nails indicating she had "fought for her life."

== Public reaction ==
In light of the relative affluence, upscale reputation and overall lack of crime in the Grosse Pointe communities, local media coverage was intense and updates were published as front page headlines.

On the evening of January 25, 2012, a candlelight vigil was held on the lawn at Grosse Pointe South High School, where Bashara had served as president of the Mother's Club. Bashara's minister led the gathering in prayer. Bashara's husband attended the vigil but did not speak to the gathering. Her funeral was held at Grosse Pointe Memorial Church and attracted hundreds of community members, including U.S. representative Hansen Clarke.

== Police investigation ==
The investigation of Bashara's death was conducted jointly by the Grosse Pointe Park police and the Detroit Police Department. The Michigan State Police also participated in the investigation.

On January 27, 2012, Grosse Pointe Park Police Chief David Hiller announced that Bob Bashara was "a person of interest" in the investigation. He said there were no other persons of interest at that time. Sources also reported at that time that Bob Bashara had taken and failed a lie detector test about his involvement in his wife's death.

By January 31, 2012, investigators revealed that they believed Jane Bashara had been murdered in her home and then placed in her SUV.

A February 1, 2012 news report published that Joe Gentz, a developmentally-disabled handyman who rented a property from Bob Bashara, had confessed to helping dispose of Jane Bashara's body after murdering her in her garage. Gentz reportedly told police that Bob Bashara had paid him $2,000 and an old Cadillac to murder his wife. Allegedly Gentz turned himself in on January 31, 2012 but that police had dismissed the confession made by Gentz, who had an IQ of 67, a score considered to be on the low end of scale by most intelligence tests.

On February 2, 2012, several publications reported that Bob Bashara "allegedly led a double life centering on the underground world of sadomasochism and sexual deviancy with women other than his wife." It was also reported that he maintained a "sex dungeon" in the basement of the Hard Luck Lounge, located in a building owned by Bob Bashara on Mack Avenue in Grosse Pointe Park. On February 4, 2012, Bob Bashara commented that, "I did not kill my wife. I have nothing to do with this."

In February 2012, multiple news media sources also reported on Bob Bashara's relationship with an alleged mistress, Rachel Rene Gillett, who had been employed in the office of alumni affairs at Wayne State University. Gillett was fired after leaving the office on the day Jane Bashara's body was discovered. Police raided Gillett's home in early March 2012. Police stated that Gillett was not a person of interest but left her home carrying seven cardboard boxes and an evidence bag. Bashara's attorney told the press that the Basharas had an "open marriage."

On March 3, 2012, Joe Gentz was arrested in Mount Clemens, Michigan. Following his arrest in early March, Gentz was charged with first-degree murder.

On March 9, 2012, newspapers reported the clothing worn by Jane Bashara at the time of her death was missing or had been destroyed. It was discovered that the clothes, which were supposed to have been shipped to the Michigan State Police crime laboratory, had been picked up from the Wayne County medical examiner by a funeral home.

On April 9, 2012, multiple sources also reported that detectives continued to focus on Bob Bashara and a possible conspiracy and that criminal charges could be filed against him.

"A source familiar with the investigation told the [Detroit] Free Press on June 24, 2012, that Bashara is accused of attempting to have someone murder Joe Gentz. The former handyman told investigators he was hired by Bashara to kill his wife, Jane Bashara."

On December 18, 2014, Bob Bashara was found guilty of the murder of his wife Jane. On January 15, 2015, Bob Bashara was sentenced to life without parole by Wayne County Circuit Court Judge Vonda Evans.

In January, 2016, Gentz claimed he had committed perjury under pressure from Grosse Pointe Park police and that Bob Bashara was not involved in the murder of his wife. Gentz later recanted the affidavit, saying, "I never read what I sign."

On August 18, 2020, Bob Bashara died in prison at the age of 62.

== See also ==
- List of homicides in Michigan
