= Grosse Pointe Public School System =

School district in Michigan

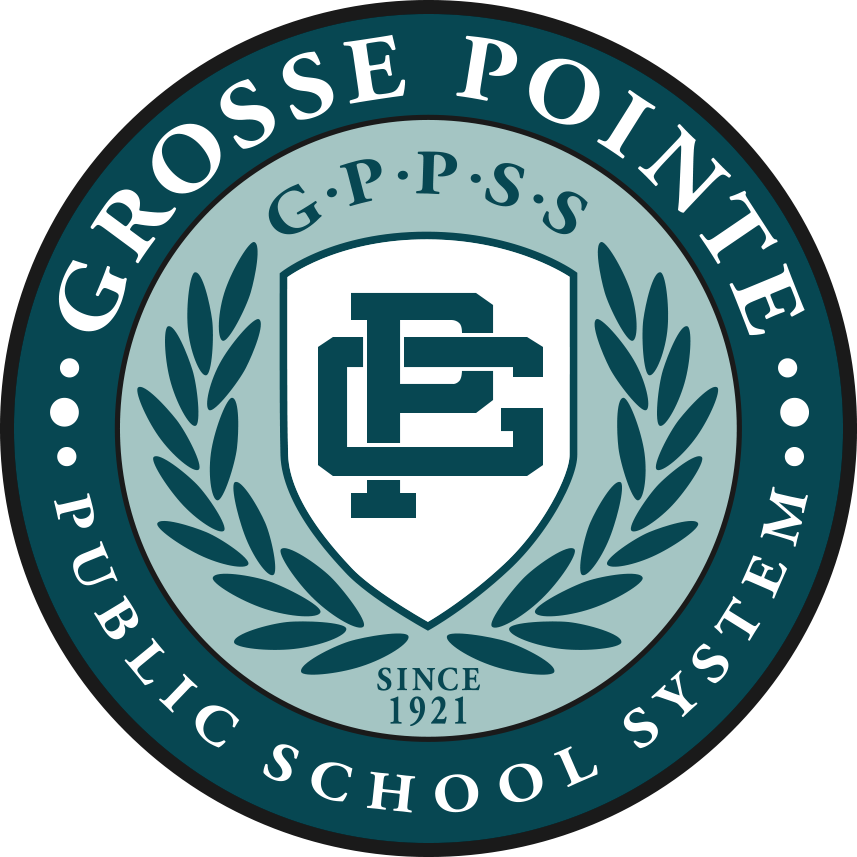

Address
- 20601 Morningside Grosse Pointe Woods, Wayne, Michigan; United States

District information
- Type: Public school district
- Grades: K-12
- Established: December 23, 1921
- Superintendent: Dr. Roy Bishop, Jr.
- Schools: 2 High Schools; 3 Middle Schools; 7 Elementary Schools
- Budget: $162,667,000 2022-2023 expenditures
- NCES District ID: 2625740

Students and staff
- Students: 6,419 (2024-2025)
- Teachers: 389.83 (on an FTE basis) (2024-2025)
- Staff: 841.49 FTE (2024-2025)
- Student–teacher ratio: 16.47 (2024-2025)
- Athletic conference: Macomb Area Conference

Other information
- Website: www.gpschools.org

The Grosse Pointe Public School System (GPPSS) is a public school district in Wayne County, Michigan. It serves Grosse Pointe, Grosse Pointe Farms, Grosse Pointe Park, Grosse Pointe Woods, and The Village of Grosse Pointe Shores, a Michigan City. It also serves a part of Harper Woods.

== History ==
Voters approved the consolidation of five Grosse Pointe-area school districts in December, 1921. In 1925, the first high school class graduated from the building at 389 St. Clair St. Grosse Pointe South High School opened in February 1928, and Grosse Pointe North High School opened in fall 1968.

== Schools ==
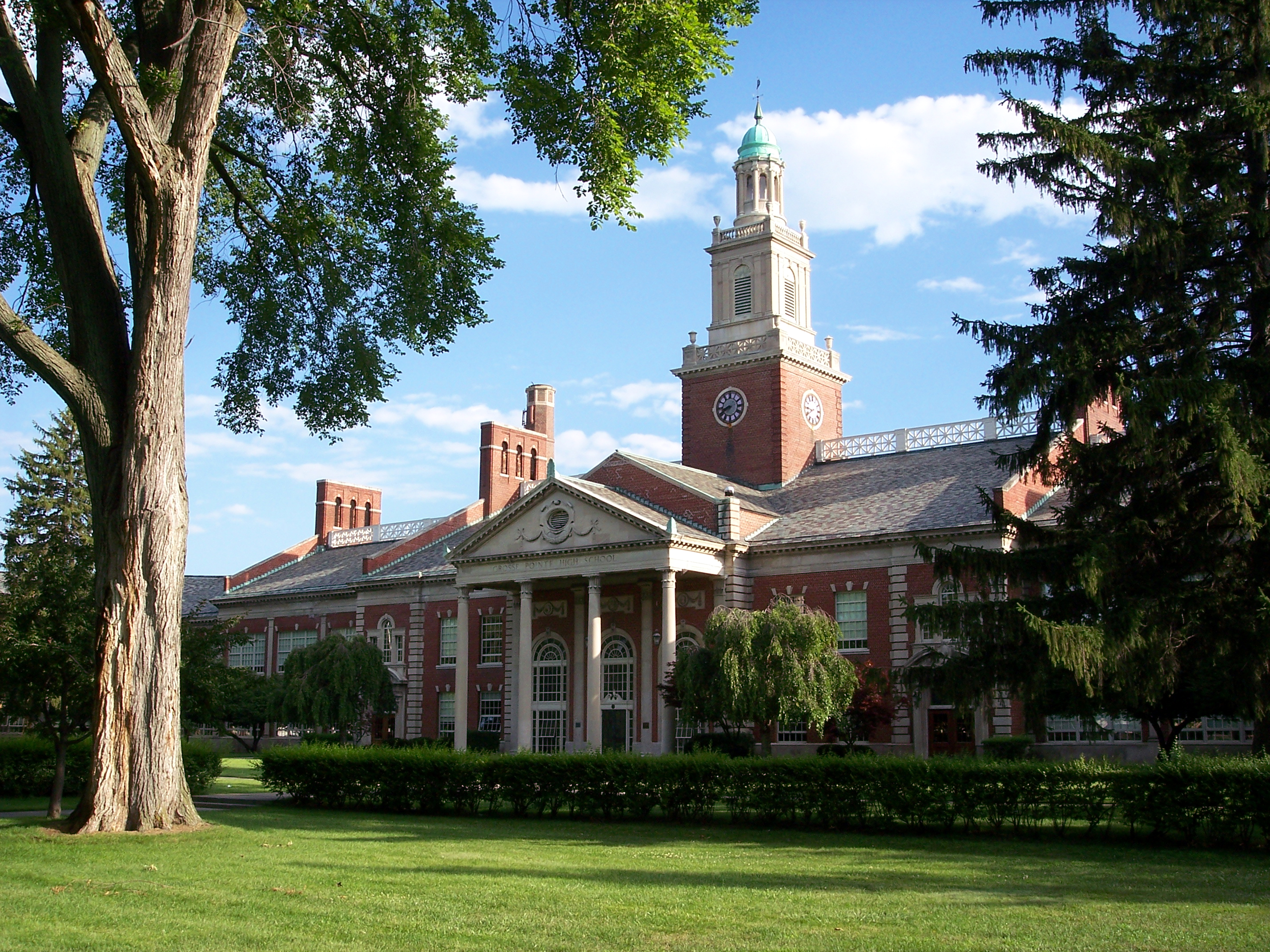
Grosse Pointe South High School

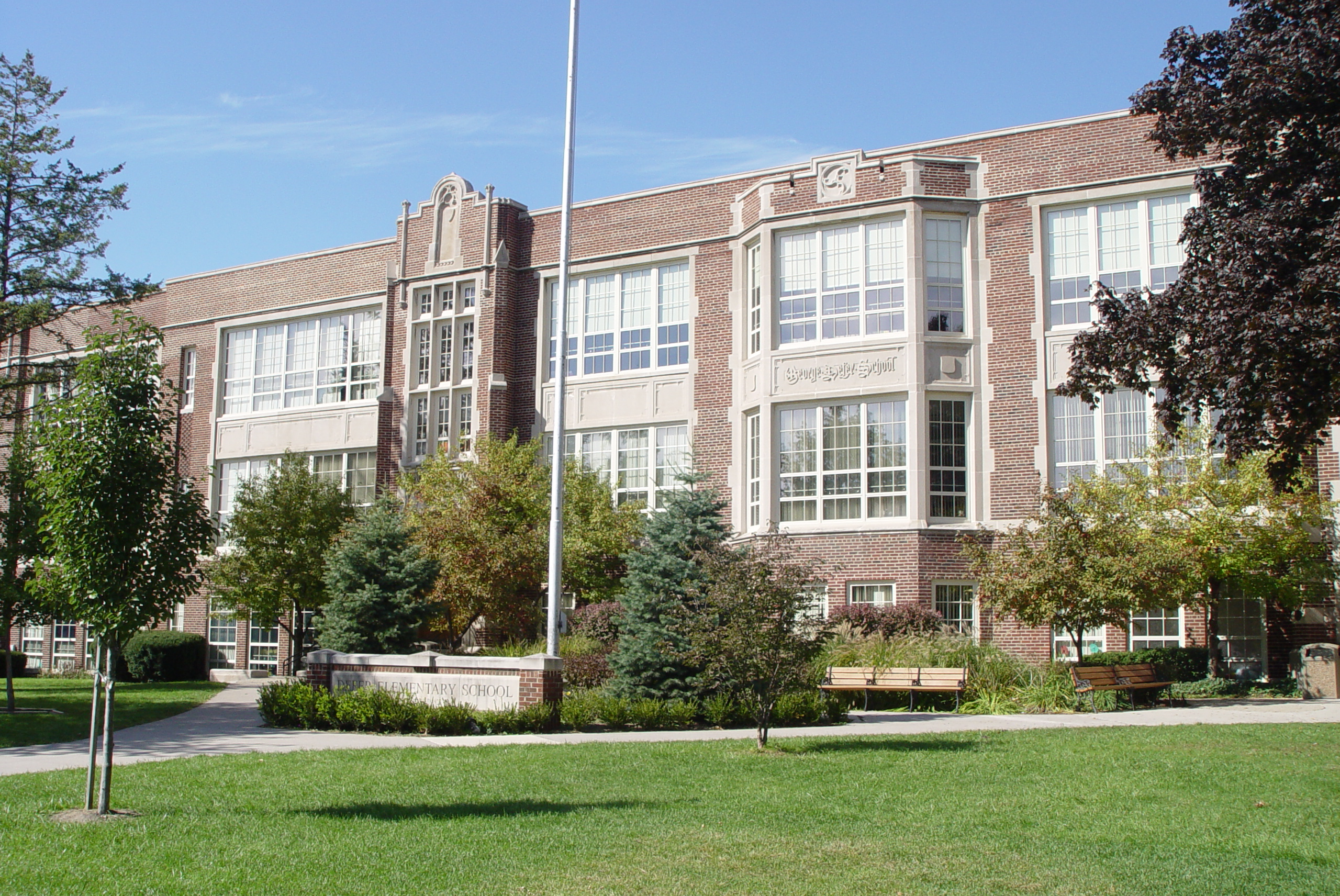
Defer Elementary School

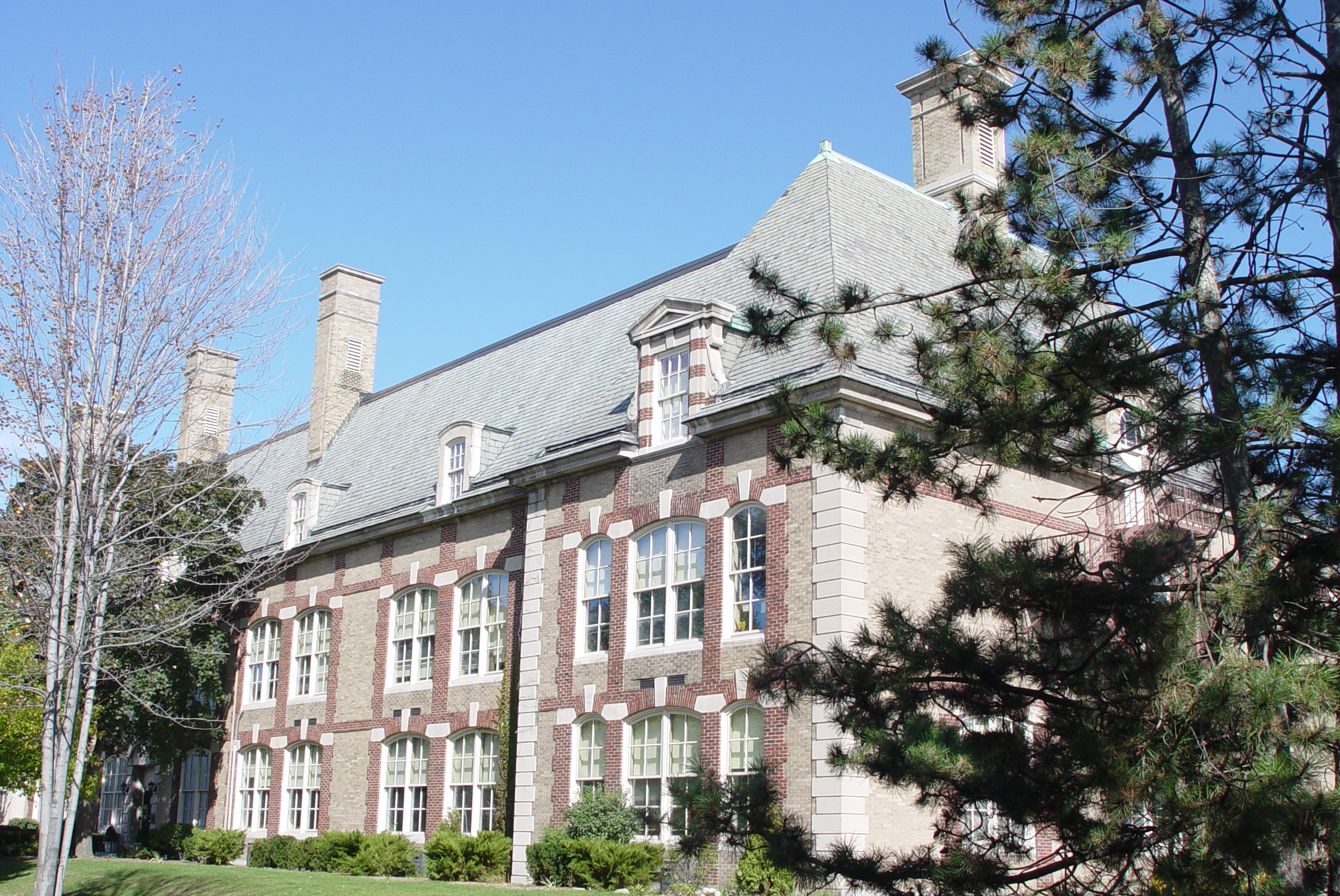
Pere Gabriel Richard Elementary School

High schools:

- Grosse Pointe North High School (Grosse Pointe Woods)
- Grosse Pointe South High School (Grosse Pointe Farms)

Middle schools:

- Brownell Middle School (Grosse Pointe Farms)
- Parcells Middle School (Grosse Pointe Woods)
- Pierce Middle School (Grosse Pointe Park)

Elementary schools:

- Defer Elementary School (Grosse Pointe Park)
- Ferry Elementary School (Grosse Pointe Woods, formerly Ferry Middle School)
- Kerby Elementary School (Grosse Pointe Farms)
- Maire Elementary School (Grosse Pointe)
- Stevens T. Mason Elementary School (Grosse Pointe Woods)
- Monteith Elementary School (Grosse Pointe Woods)
- Pere Gabriel Richard Elementary School (Grosse Pointe Farms)

Preschools:

- Barnes Early Childhood Center (Grosse Pointe Woods, formerly Barnes Elementary School)

In June 2019 the school board voted to close Poupard Elementary School and Trombly Elementary School as the numbers of students had declined.

== Governance ==
GPPSS policy is governed by the seven-member Board of Education and administered by the Superintendent.

=== Responsibilities ===
- Recruits, hires and evaluates the performance of the superintendent.
- Establishes policy for the district and shares in policy development.
- Helps translate the district vision into long and short-term goals. The board establishes the structure to accomplish the vision, and periodically evaluates the results.
- Reviews and adopts the budget submitted by the superintendent and aligns the funding priorities with the district goals.
- Approves recommended curriculum and texts based on standards, goals and policies established by the board. Review and evaluate curriculum as it relates to student assessment results.
- Adopts policies governing salaries and salary schedules, terms and conditions of employment, fringe benefits, leave and professional development and employee evaluations.
- Determines school facility needs and communicates proposed construction plans to the community.
- Adopts policies governing school-community relations, advocates for the public school system and remains responsive to community ideas and needs.
- Evaluates the performance of the board and provides feedback for personal leadership development.
