= Grosse Pointe Park, Michigan =

City in Michigan, United States

- City
- City of Grosse Pointe Park
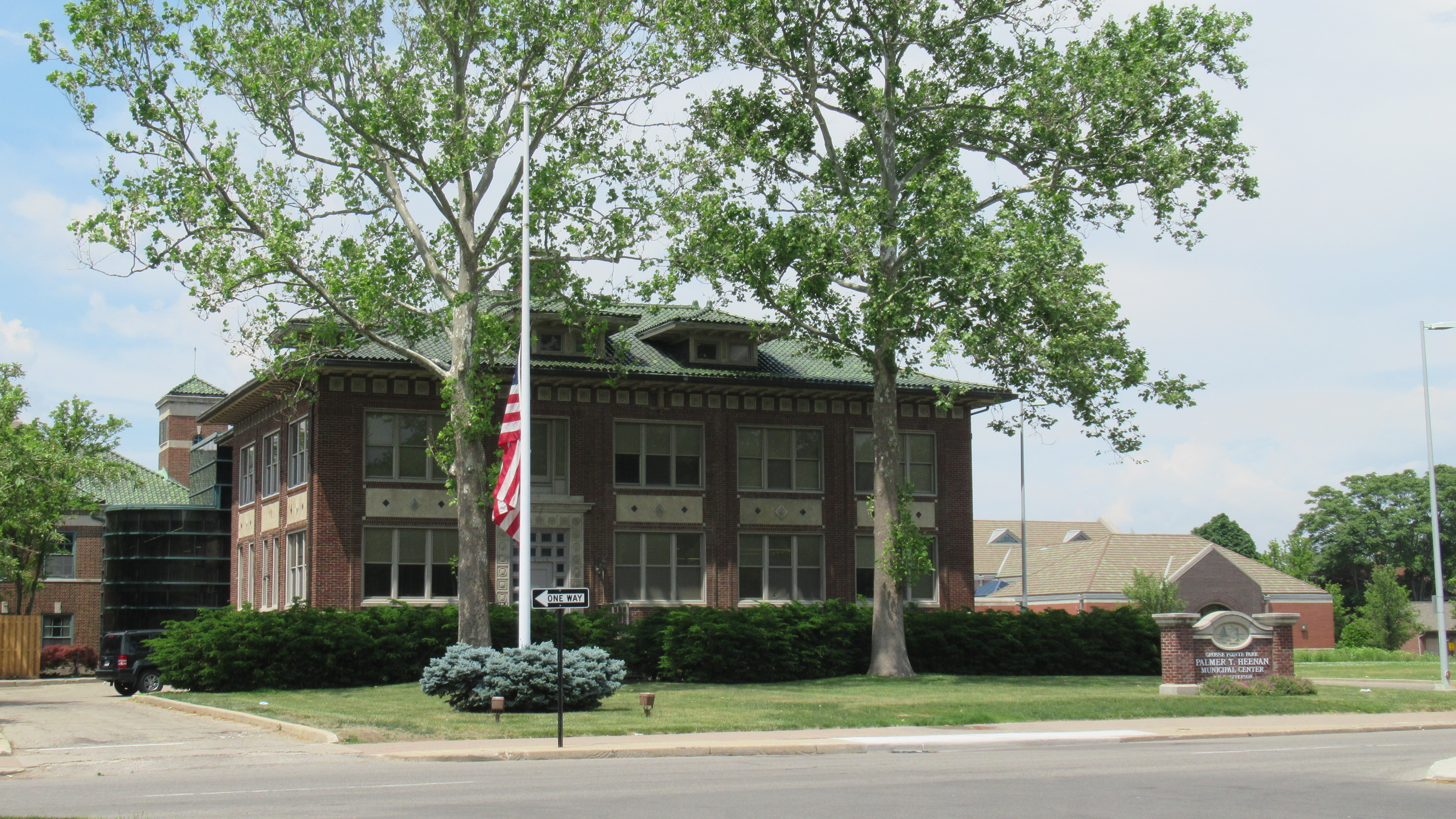
- Palmer T. Heenan Municipal Center

- Seal

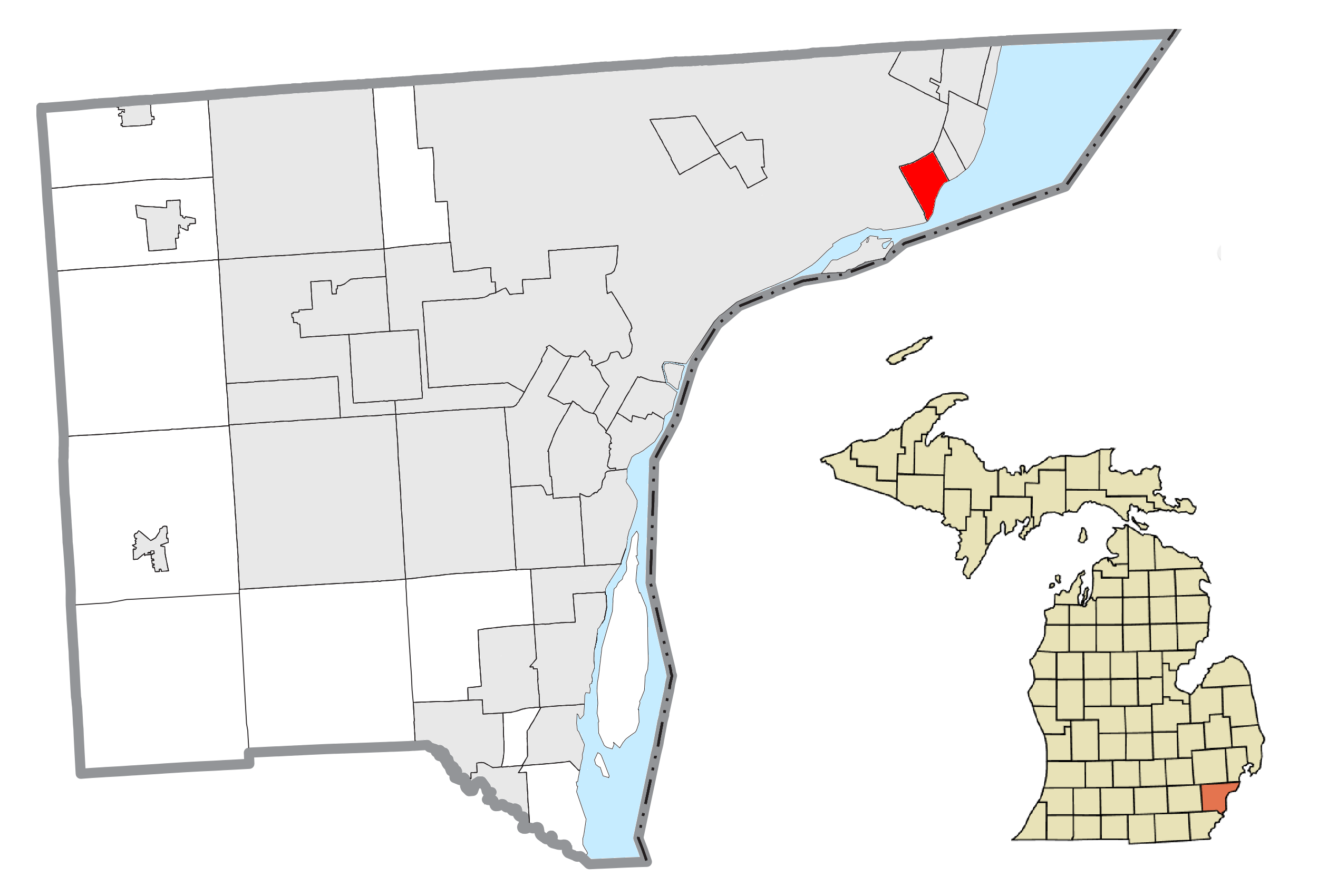
- Location in Wayne County

- Location in Michigan Location in the United States
- Coordinates: 42°22′49″N 82°55′51″W
- Country: United States
- State: Michigan
- County: Wayne
- Incorporated: 1907 (village); 1950 (city)

Government
  - Type: Mayor–council
  - Mayor: Michele Hodges
  - Manager: Nick Sizeland

Area
  - City: 3.71 sq mi (9.61 km^{2})
  - Land: 2.17 sq mi (5.61 km^{2})
  - Water: 1.54 sq mi (4.00 km^{2})
- Elevation: 577 ft (176 m)

Population (2020)
  - City: 11,595
  - Density: 5,352.9/sq mi (2,066.76/km^{2})
  - Metro: 4,285,832 (Metro Detroit)
- Time zone: UTC-5 (EST)
  - Summer (DST): UTC-4 (EDT)
- Zip code(s): 48230
- Area code: 313
- FIPS code: 26-35540
- GNIS feature ID: 0627466
- Website: grossepointepark.org

Grosse Pointe Park is a city in Wayne County in the U.S. state of Michigan. One of the five "Grosse Pointe" suburbs of Detroit, Grosse Pointe Park is located on the shore of Lake St. Clair and borders Detroit to the north and east, roughly 7 miles (11.3 km) east of downtown Detroit. As of the 2020 census, Grosse Pointe Park had a population of 11,595.

Grosse Pointe Park was incorporated as a village in 1907 and again as a city in 1950.

== History ==
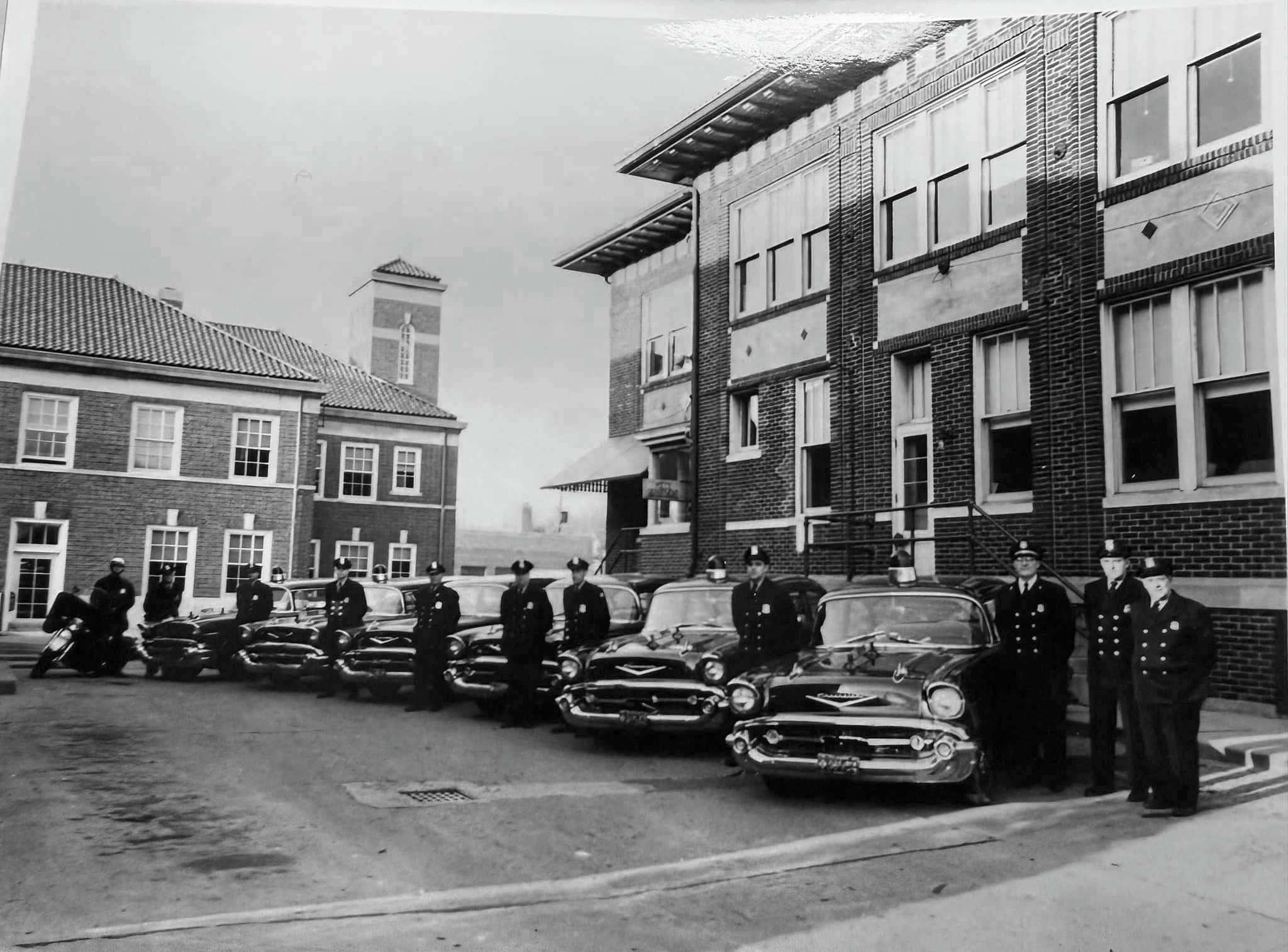
Grosse Pointe Park policemen in 1957

Before incorporation as a city, the area that would become the city of Grosse Pointe Park was incorporated as the Village of Fairview, which spanned Bewick Street in the west to Cadieux Road in the east in Grosse Pointe Township. The city of Detroit annexed part of the village in the township from Bewick Street to Alter Road in 1907. Fearing further annexation, the part of the village east of Alter Road incorporated as the Village of Grosse Pointe Park later that year. Seeking further annexation protection from Detroit and independence from its township, the village reincorporated as a city in 1950.

In November 2021, Grosse Pointe Park elected its first female mayor, Michele Hodges.

== Geography ==
According to the United States Census Bureau, the city has a total area of 3.71 square miles (9.61 km^{2}), of which 2.17 square miles (5.62 km^{2}) is land and 1.54 square miles (3.99 km^{2}) is water. The water is part of Lake St. Clair. Grosse Pointe Park has about 3.5 miles (5.6 km) of borders with Detroit, with one border between Alter Road and Wayburn to the southwest, and another along Mack Avenue to the northwest; its third border on land is with the city of Grosse Pointe along Cadieux Road to the northeast.

=== Description ===
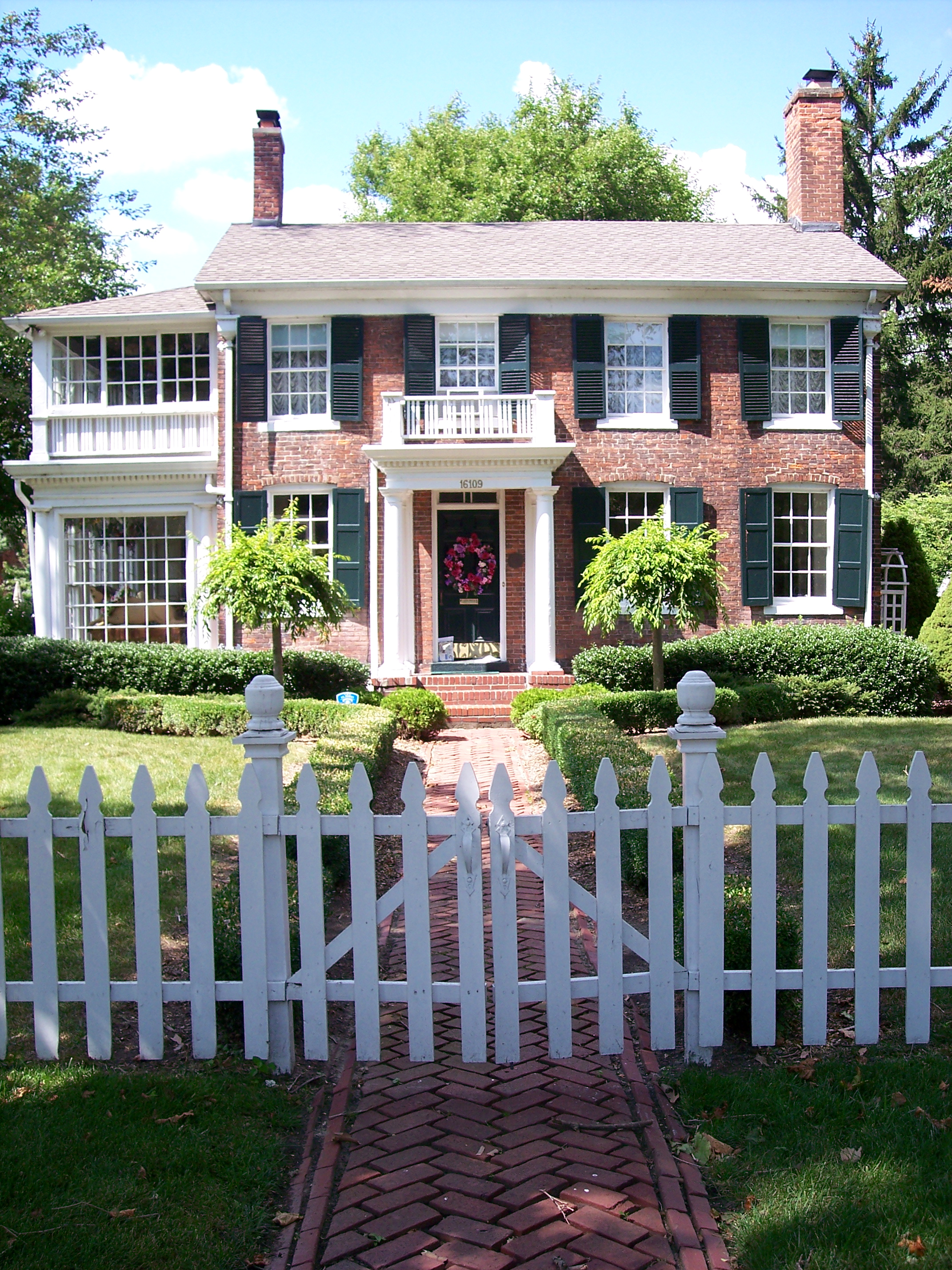
The Buck-Wardwell House on Jefferson Avenue, built in 1840, as the first brick house in Grosse Pointe

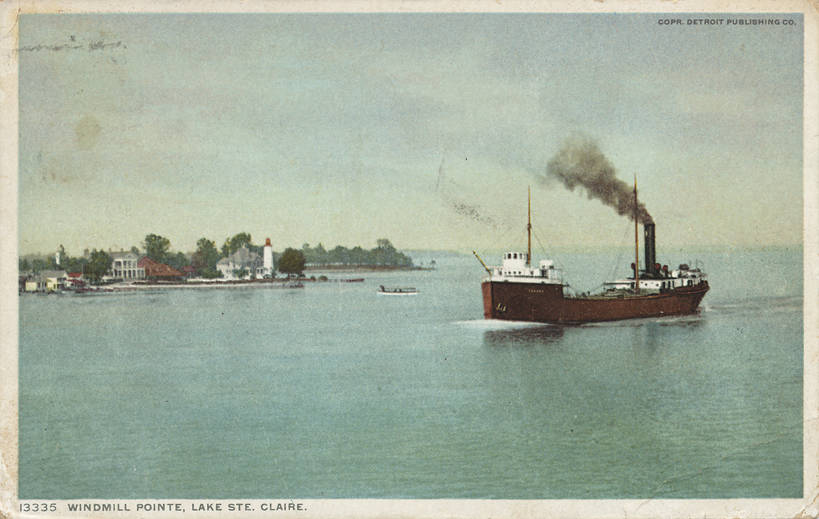
Windmill Pointe, circa 1900s

The neighborhoods in Grosse Pointe Park are built on a standard grid street pattern which flows out of Detroit, and housing ranges from tightly-packed single- and multi-family brick houses on the far west side of the Park, to rows of traditionally-styled single family homes generally averaging over 3,000 square feet (280 m^{2}), to multimillion-dollar mansions, some of which are found on the lakeshore. The west side of the city features mixed-use neighborhoods, where retail, schools, and churches are within close walking distance. The rest of the city is basically residential, but at the eastern edge residents are in close walking distance to "the Village" shopping district in Grosse Pointe. Many of the houses in the Park were built prior to World War II, and many of these were designed by noted architects using the finest materials. Windmill Pointe Drive, and streets such as Bishop, Kensington, Yorkshire, Edgemont Park, Three Mile Drive, Devonshire, Buckingham, Berkshire, Balfour, Middlesex, and Nottingham among others, each have dozens of large, architecturally significant homes. These mansions and mini-mansions were often placed on large lots which were often split up, the result being that some post-war ranch style homes are mixed in with homes of traditional design.

Grosse Pointe Park includes a large neighborhood located on Windmill Pointe, the edge of which marks the entrance to the Detroit River and the end of Lake St. Clair. A large lakefront park with a pool, gym, movie theaters, and gathering spaces for residents only is found at this spot. At the base of the point, at the foot of Three Mile Drive, is another large park, Patterson Park, which is known for its skating rink and walking trails. One way that people distinguish geography in Grosse Pointe Park is by location north or south of Jefferson Avenue, the south side being generalized as Windmill Pointe.

The Park also includes a section known as the "cabbage patch," an area of town with multi-family houses in contrast to the single-family homes with larger lots that populate the vast majority of the Grosse Pointes. The cabbage patch is generally considered to be the northwest corner of the city, bounded by Mack, Wayburn, Jefferson, and Somerset, with a small extension south of Jefferson on Nottingham and Beaconsfield. The region's name can be seen in various local establishments such as the Cabbage Patch Cafe and Cabbage Patch Saloon.

Grosse Pointe Park, along with Grosse Pointe and Grosse Pointe Farms, is in the Grosse Pointe South High School district. The elementary school in the Park: Defer, is in addition to one middle school: Pierce Middle School. The eastern Park is also served by Maire Elementary in Grosse Pointe in the Village district. Then serves the one high school, South High School off Fisher Road. There is one private school in the Park, the K-8 St. Clare of Montefalco Catholic School on Charlevoix and Audubon streets.

== Demographics ==
=== Racial and ethnic composition ===
Grosse Pointe Park, Michigan – Racial and ethnic composition Note: the US Census treats Hispanic/Latino as an ethnic category. This table excludes Latinos from the racial categories and assigns them to a separate category. Hispanics/Latinos may be of any race.
Race / Ethnicity (NH = Non-Hispanic)	Pop 2000	Pop 2010	Pop 2020	% 2000	% 2010	% 2020
White alone (NH)	11,345	9,596	9,594	91.18%	83.05%	82.74%
Black or African American alone (NH)	362	1210	787	2.91%	10.47%	6.79%
Native American or Alaska Native alone (NH)	41	18	24	0.33%	0.16%	0.21%
Asian alone (NH)	220	206	283	1.77%	1.78%	2.44%
Native Hawaiian or Pacific Islander alone (NH)	4	2	0	0.03%	0.02%	0.00%
Other race alone (NH)	21	29	46	0.17%	0.25%	0.40%
Mixed race or Multiracial (NH)	233	203	472	1.87%	1.76%	4.07%
Hispanic or Latino (any race)	217	291	389	1.74%	2.52%	3.35%
Total	12,443	11,555	11,595	100.00%	100.00%	100.00%

Historical population
Census	Pop.	Note	%±
1910	290		—
1920	1,355		367.2%
1930	11,174		724.6%
1940	12,646		13.2%
1950	13,075		3.4%
1960	15,457		18.2%
1970	15,641		1.2%
1980	13,562		−13.3%
1990	12,857		−5.2%
2000	12,443		−3.2%
2010	11,555		−7.1%
2020	11,595		0.3%
U.S. Decennial Census

=== 2020 census ===
As of the 2020 census, Grosse Pointe Park had a population of 11,595. The median age was 41.3 years. 22.4% of residents were under the age of 18 and 17.2% of residents were 65 years of age or older. For every 100 females there were 95.7 males, and for every 100 females age 18 and over there were 94.7 males age 18 and over.

There were 4,653 households in Grosse Pointe Park, of which 31.7% had children under the age of 18 living in them. Of all households, 54.2% were married-couple households, 16.5% were households with a male householder and no spouse or partner present, and 24.1% were households with a female householder and no spouse or partner present. About 26.3% of all households were made up of individuals and 9.3% had someone living alone who was 65 years of age or older.

There were 4,958 housing units, of which 6.2% were vacant. The homeowner vacancy rate was 1.2% and the rental vacancy rate was 7.7%.

100.0% of residents lived in urban areas, while 0.0% lived in rural areas.

=== 2010 census ===
As of the census of 2010, there were 11,555 people, 4,516 households, and 3,182 families residing in the city. The population density was 5,324.9 inhabitants per square mile (2,056.0/km^{2}). There were 4,997 housing units at an average density of 2,302.8 per square mile (889.1/km^{2}). The racial makeup of the city was 85.0% White, 10.5% African American, 0.2% Native American, 1.8% Asian, 0.5% from other races, and 1.9% from two or more races. Hispanic or Latino of any race were 2.5% of the population.

There were 4,516 households, of which 35.8% had children under the age of 18 living with them, 55.6% were married couples living together, 11.8% had a female householder with no husband present, 3.1% had a male householder with no wife present, and 29.5% were non-families. 24.7% of all households were made up of individuals, and 8.8% had someone living alone who was 65 years of age or older. The average household size was 2.56 and the average family size was 3.10.

The median age in the city was 41.8 years. 26.5% of residents were under the age of 18; 6.6% were between the ages of 18 and 24; 22.1% were from 25 to 44; 32.1% were from 45 to 64; and 12.8% were 65 years of age or older. The gender makeup of the city was 48.4% male and 51.6% female.

=== 2000 census ===
As of the census of 2000, there were 12,443 people, 4,816 households, and 3,303 families residing in the city. The population density was 5,772.6 inhabitants per square mile (2,228.8/km^{2}). There were 5,043 housing units at an average density of 2,339.6 per square mile (903.3/km^{2}). The racial makeup of the city was 92.48% White, 2.95% African American, 0.35% Native American, 1.82% Asian, 0.03% Pacific Islander, 0.39% from other races, and 1.98% from two or more races. Hispanic or Latino of any race were 1.74% of the population.

There were 4,816 households, out of which 35.6% had children under the age of 18 living with them, 57.3% were married couples living together, 8.5% had a female householder with no husband present, and 31.4% were non-families. 26.2% of all households were made up of individuals, and 7.6% had someone living alone who was 65 years of age or older. The average household size was 2.58 and the average family size was 3.18.

In the city, the population was spread out, with 27.5% under the age of 18, 6.1% from 18 to 24, 29.3% from 25 to 44, 26.3% from 45 to 64, and 10.8% who were 65 years of age or older. The median age was 38 years. For every 100 females, there were 94.1 males. For every 100 females age 18 and over, there were 91.2 males.

The median income for a household in the city was $105,161. Males had a median income of $92,611 versus $63,488 for females. The per capita income for the city was $58,223. About 1.8% of families and 4.0% of the population were below the poverty line, including 3.1% of those under age 18 and 1.9% of those age 65 or over.

== Education ==
=== Primary and secondary schools ===
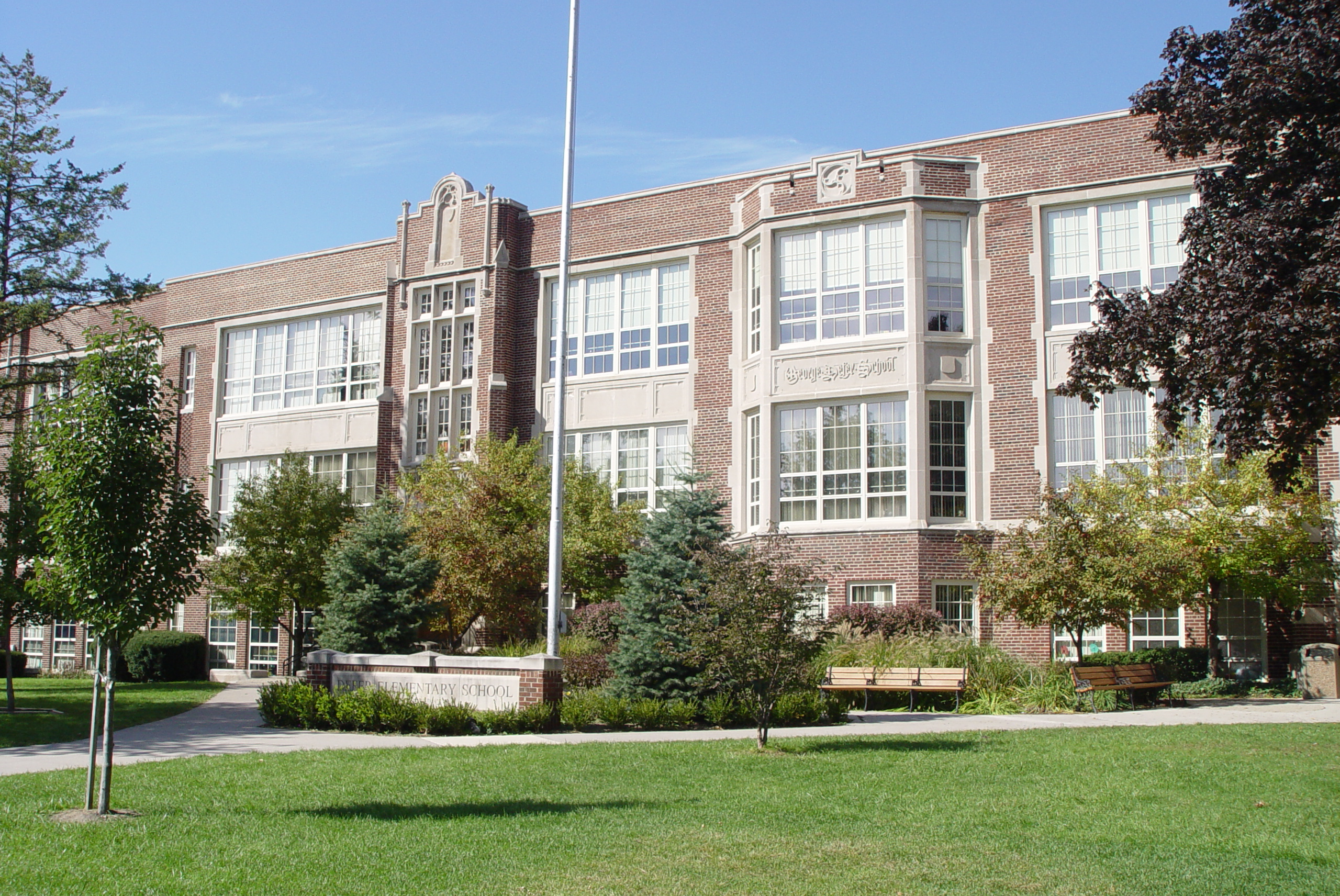
Defer Elementary School

Grosse Pointe Public Schools serves Grosse Pointe Park.

Defer Elementary School, and Pierce Middle School are located in Grosse Pointe Park. Maire Elementary School in Grosse Pointe also serves a section of the city. All residents are zoned to Pierce Middle and Grosse Pointe South High School in Grosse Pointe Farms.

St. Clare of Montefalco School, a private Catholic K-8 school, is in Grosse Pointe Park.

=== Public libraries ===
The Grosse Pointe Public Library operates the Carolyn and Ted Ewald Memorial Branch Library in Grosse Pointe Park. The library was scheduled to open in 2004. The 15,000 square feet (1,400 m^{2}) branch was originally scheduled to open in October of that year, but delays moved the opening month to January 2005.

== Notable people ==
- Anita Baker, singer
- Kevin Barnes, singer-songwriter
- Jane Bashara, marketing executive and murder victim
- Dorothy Marie Donnelly, poet
- Mariela Griffor, author, moved to Grosse Pointe from Chile
- Paul S. Kemp, author
- Mark Tremonti, musician

== Images ==
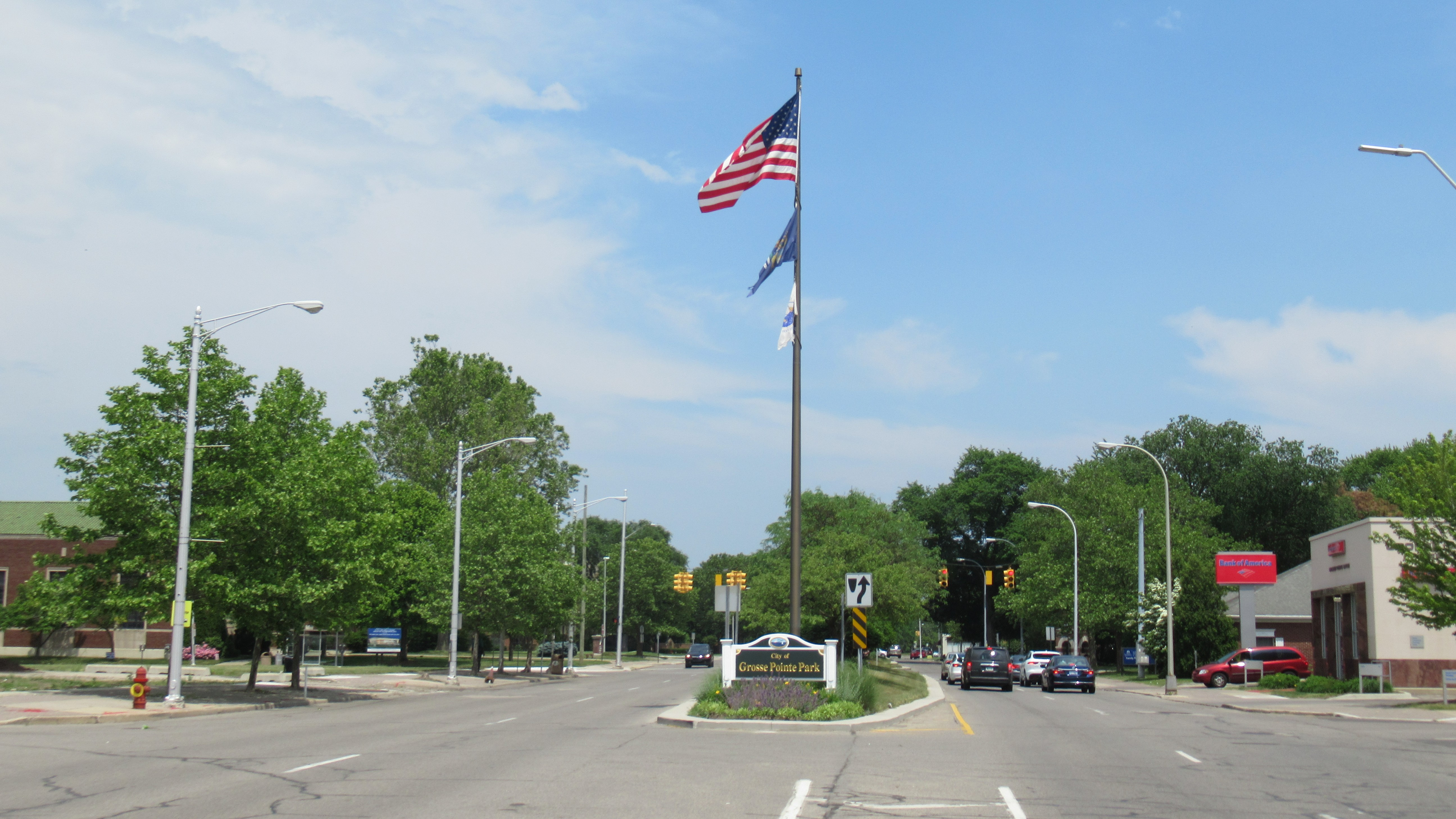
Entrance along Jefferson Avenue

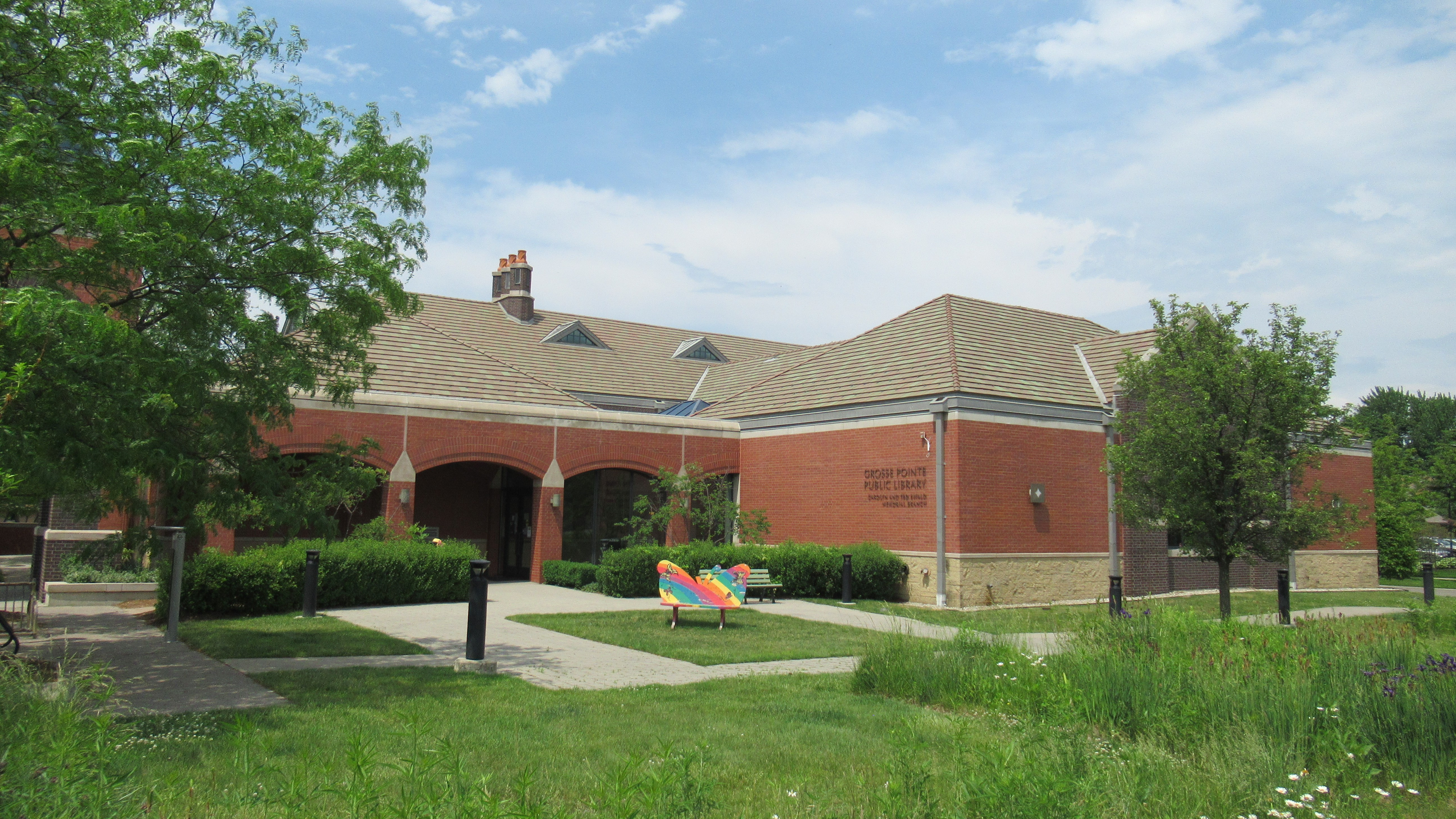
Grosse Pointe Park Public Library

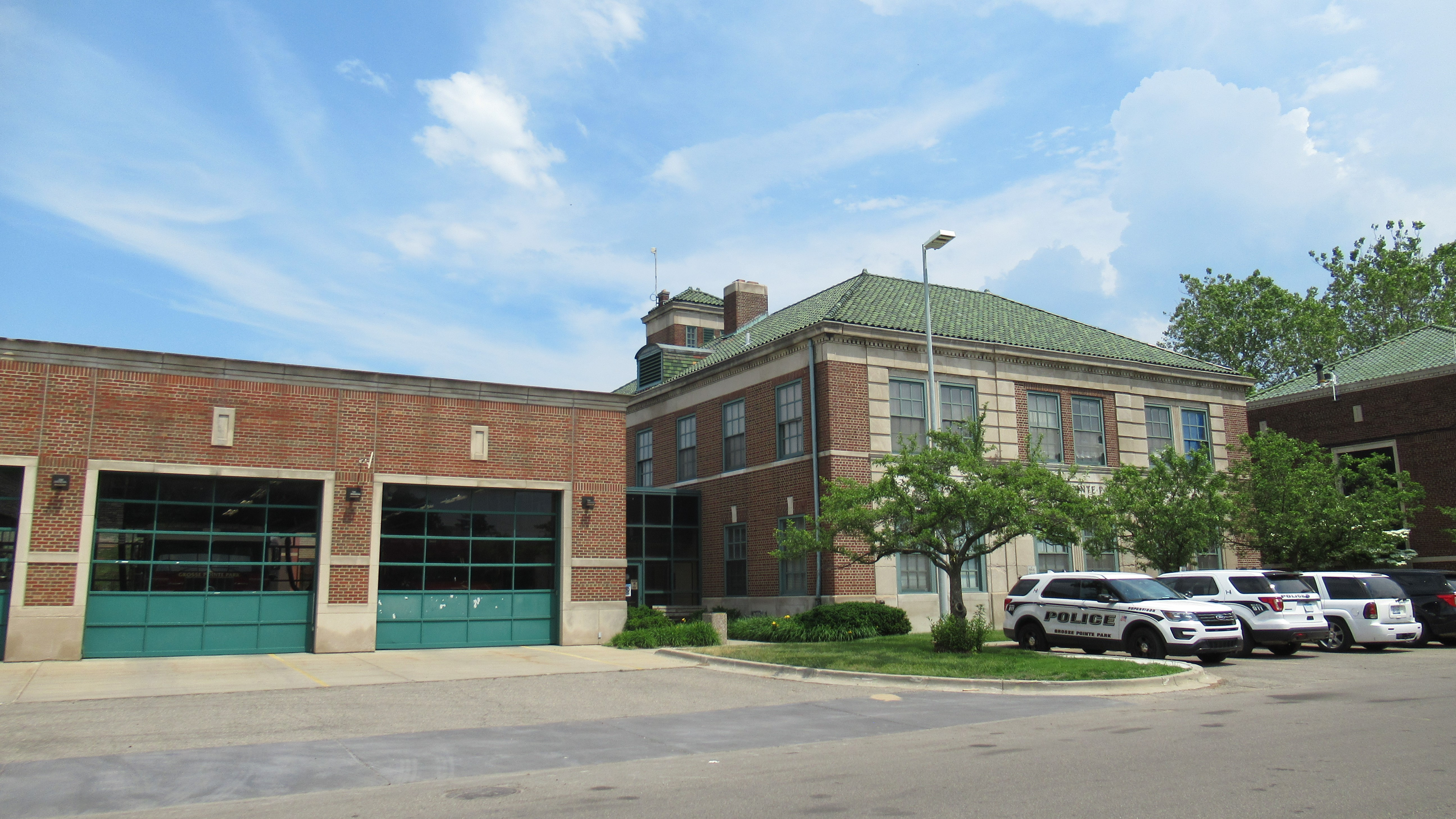
Fire and police department
