= Grosse Pointe South High School =

Historic public high school in Grosse Pointe, Michigan

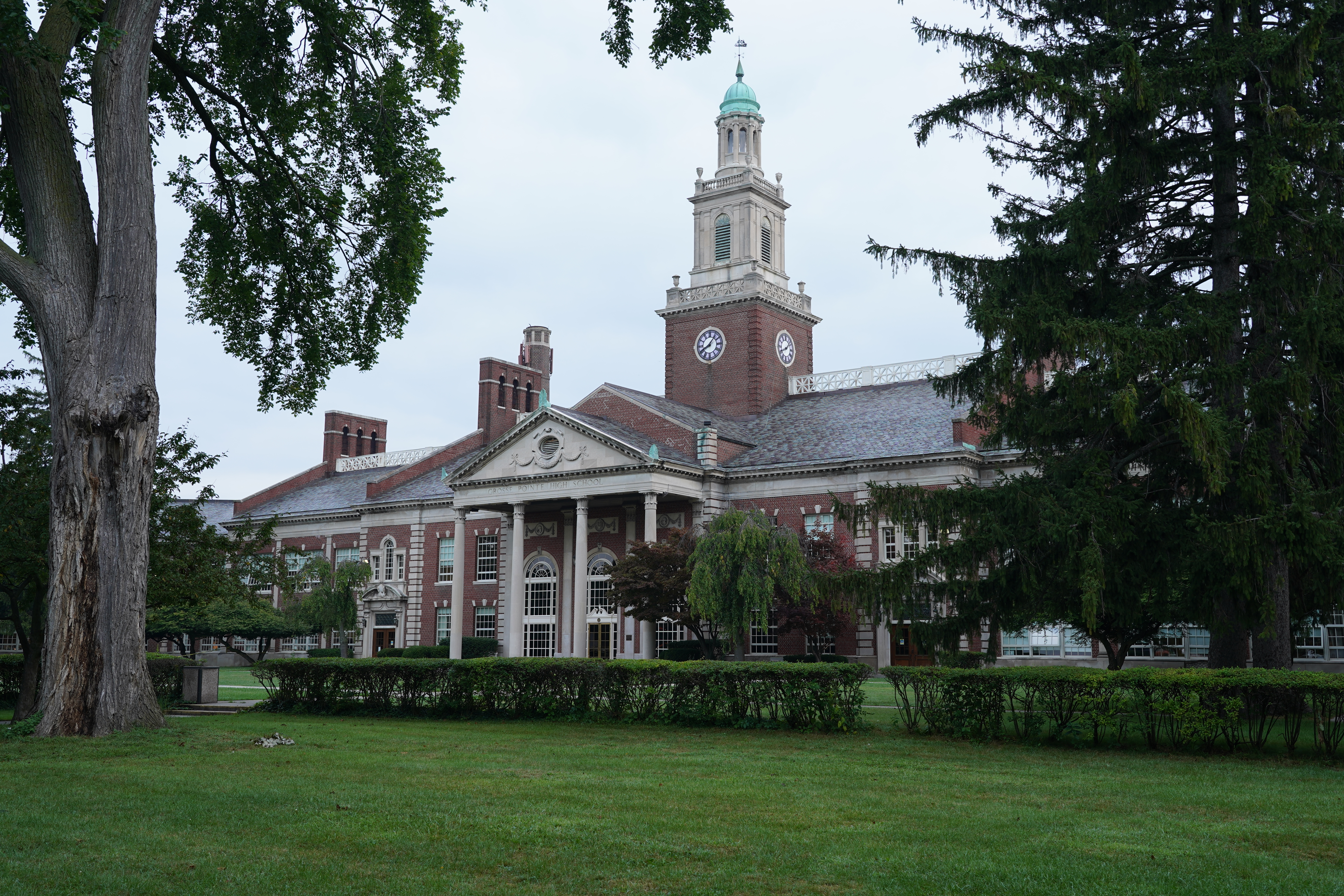
- Grosse Pointe South High School in September 2019

Location
- 11 Grosse Pointe Boulevard; Grosse Pointe Farms, Michigan 48236-3711; United States; 42.390754°N 82.902652°W

Information
- Other names: South, Grosse Pointe South, GPS, GPSHS
- Former name: Grosse Pointe High School (1928–1968)
- Type: Comprehensive public high school
- Opened: 1928; 98 years ago
- Status: Currently operational
- School district: Grosse Pointe Public School System
- NCES District ID: 2625740
- Superintendent: Roy Bishop Jr.
- CEEB code: 231–802
- NCES School ID: 262574006220
- Principal: Cindy Parravano
- Teaching staff: 67.24 FTE
- Grades: 9–12
- Gender: Co-educational
- Enrollment: 1,164 (2023–2024)
  - Grade 9: 273
  - Grade 10: 283
  - Grade 11: 287
  - Grade 12: 312
  - Ungraded: 9
- Student to teacher ratio: 17.31
- Schedule type: Semester
- Schedule: 7 50-minute periods
- Campus size: 23 acres
- Campus type: Suburban
- Song: "Grosse Pointe South Alma Mater"
- Fight song: "Victory March of the Blue Devils"
- Athletics conference: Macomb Area Conference – White division
- Mascot: Blue Devil
- Nickname: Blue Devils
- Rival: Grosse Pointe North High School Norsemen
- Accreditation: Cognia
- ACT average: 25.8
- Publication: Looking Glass (art and literary magazine)
- Newspaper: The Tower (print); The Tower Pulse (online)
- Yearbook: Viewpointe
- Communities served: Grosse Pointe
- Feeder schools: Pierce Middle School: Students from all elementary school zones; Brownell Middle School: Students only from Kerby and Richard elementary school zones
- Website: south.gpschools.org
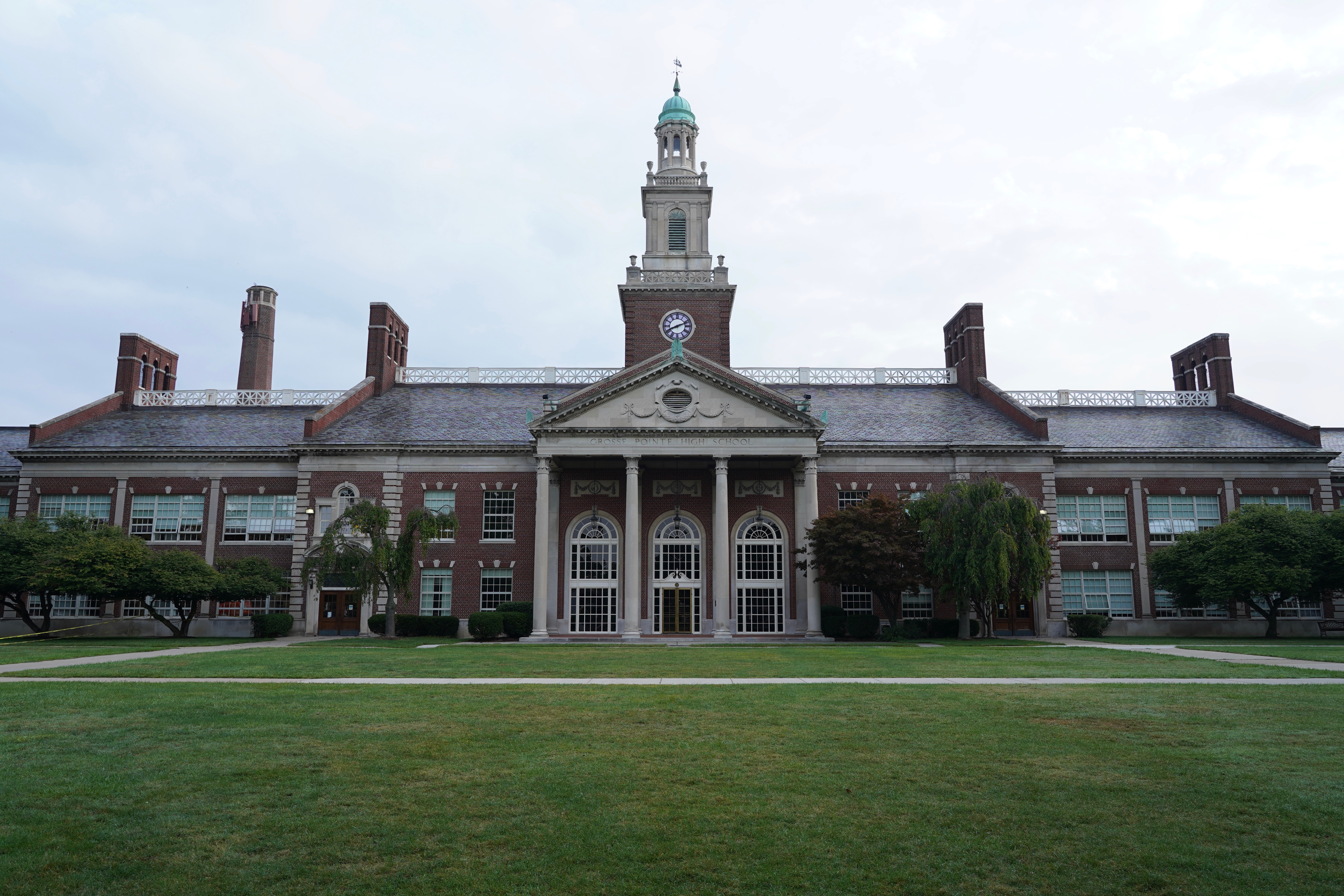
- Grosse Pointe South High School from the front lawn
- Grosse Pointe High School
- U.S. National Register of Historic Places
- U.S. Historic district
- Michigan State Historic Site
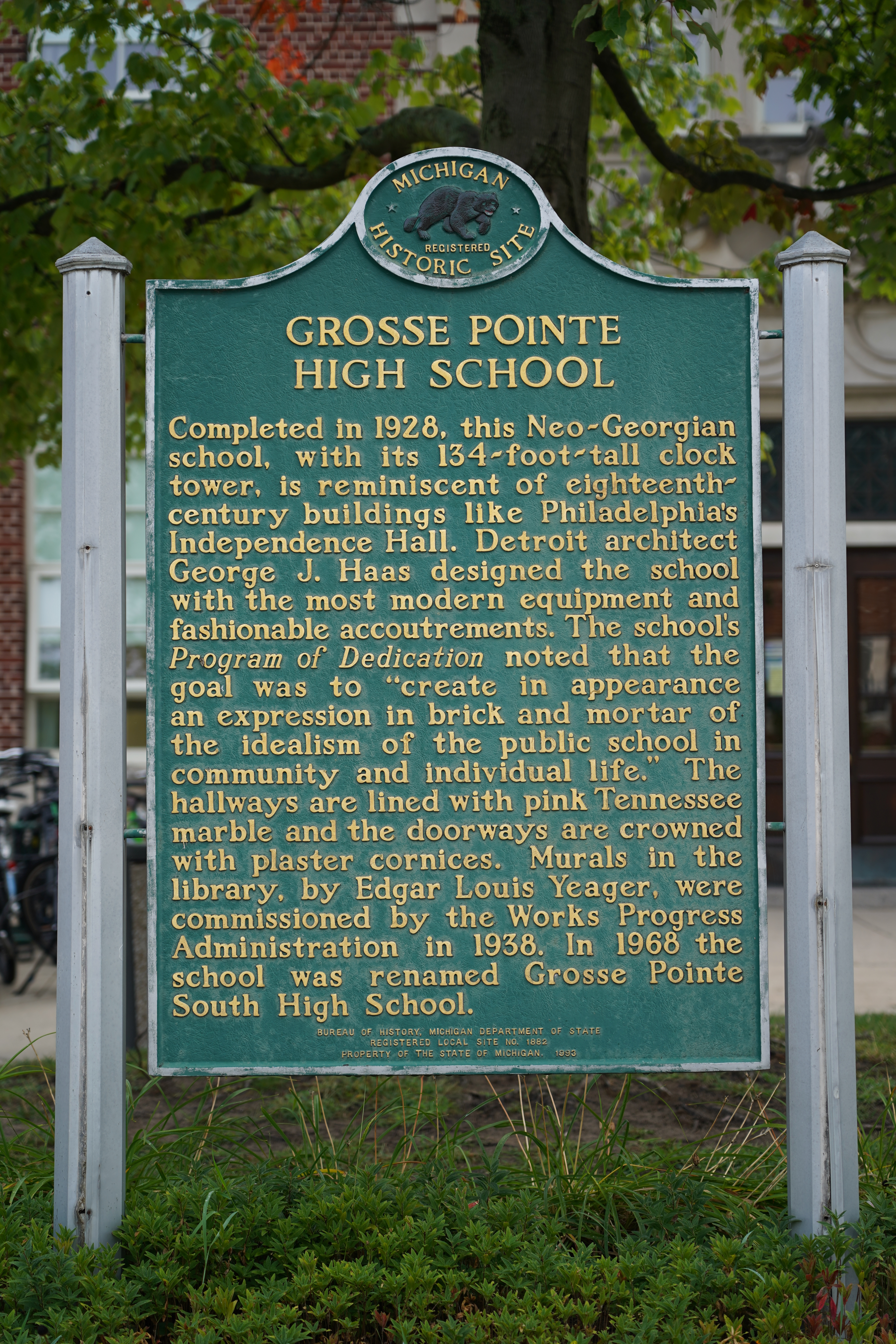
- Grosse Pointe High School historic site marker
- Coordinates: 42.390686°N 82.903787°W
- Built: 1927–1928
- Built by: Carl S. Barry Co.
- Architect: George J. Haas
- Architectural style: Colonial Revival (Neo-Georgian)
- NRHP reference No.: 93000429
- MSHS No.: L1882

Significant dates
- Architecture: 1927–1928
- Education: 1928–1943
- Art: 1938
- Added to NRHP: May 20, 1993; 33 years ago
- Designated MSHS: 1992; 34 years ago
- Last updated: March 31, 2022

Martin Luther King Jr. in Grosse Pointe
- Interactive map of Martin Luther King Jr. in Grosse Pointe
- 42.390753°N 82.903830°W

Michigan State Historic Site
- Designated: 2018; 8 years ago
- Reference no.: S754

Grosse Pointe South High School is a public high school of state and national historical significance serving the Detroit suburb of Grosse Pointe. Originally known as Grosse Pointe High School when it opened in 1928, the school adopted its current name in 1968 after the newly established Grosse Pointe North High School began accepting students.

== Communities served and feeder patterns ==
The school serves the following municipalities: almost all of Grosse Pointe Farms, and all of Grosse Pointe (city) and Grosse Pointe Park.

Elementary schools feeding into GPSHS include all of the zones of Defer, Kerby, Maire, Père Gabriel Richard, and Trombly. All of the boundaries of Pierce Middle School and most of the boundary of Brownell Middle School coincides with that of GPSHS.

== Academics ==
Student assessments
- 2021–22 school year Change vs. prior year

M-STEP 11th grade proficiency rates (Science / Social Studies)
- Advanced %: 37.5 / 22.5
- Proficient %: 29.6 / 36.5
- PR. Proficient %: 12.1 / 33.6
- Not Proficient %: 20.8 / 7.5

Average test scores
- SAT Total: 1116.1 (▼ −37.6)

In 2009, Newsweek ranked Grosse Pointe South in the top 2% of high school in the United States. In 2010, Newsweek ranked Grosse Pointe South 920th nationally (fifth in Michigan).

== Martin Luther King Jr. visit and speech ==
Grosse Pointe High School hosted a speech by Martin Luther King Jr. on March 14, 1968. 2,700 people gathered in the gymnasium to hear a speech entitled "The Other America" three weeks before his assassination. The Grosse Pointe Human Relations Council, a citizens' group concerned about housing discrimination in Grosse Pointe Farms, Michigan, had invited King to speak. Around 200 right wing protesters picketed outside the event, and hecklers attempted to interrupt the speech inside.

To honor the 50th anniversary of the event, the Grosse Pointe News partnered with the Grosse Pointe Board of Realtors in submitting an application for a historic site marker to be placed near the one previously installed on campus. The marker, which was approved by the Michigan Historical Commission on July 27, 2018, was paid for by a grant from the National Association of Realtors.

== Hosting an NBA game ==
Grosse Pointe High School hosted game 1 of the NBA's Western Divisional Semi-finals vs the Detroit Pistons and Minneapolis Lakers on March 12, 1960. The Pistons were forced to play at the high school because nobody booked Olympia Stadium for the playoffs. The game was a close one, with the Lakers winning 113–112.

== Extracurricular activities ==
=== Athletics ===
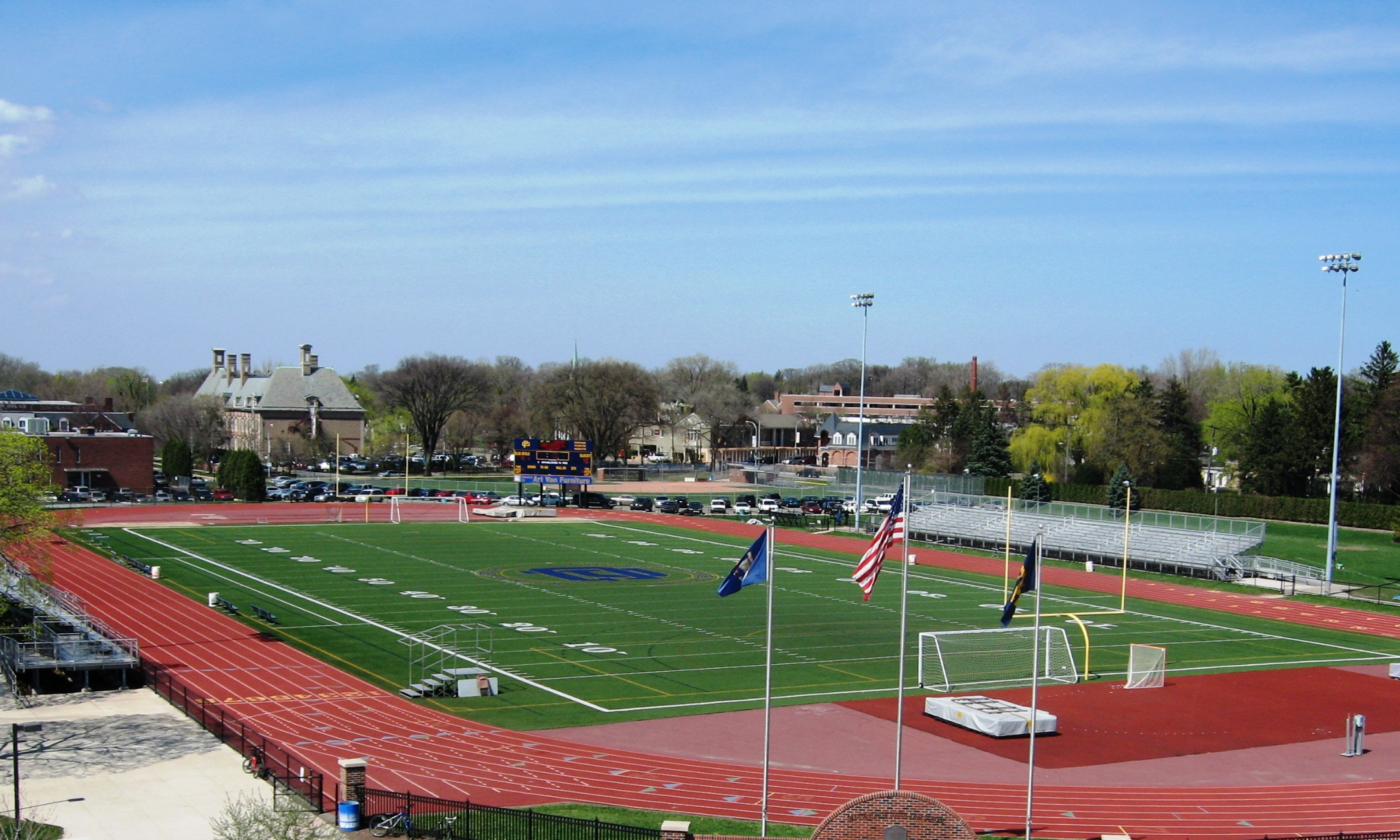
Grosse Pointe South athletic field

As of 2010, the school offers 15 varsity sports teams for boys and 18 varsity sports teams for girls. These sports include baseball, basketball, competitive cheer, crew, cross country, field hockey, figure skating, football, golf, gymnastics, ice hockey, lacrosse, sailing, soccer, softball, swimming and diving, synchronized swimming, tennis, track and field, volleyball, and wrestling. Grosse Pointe South competes in the Macomb Area Conference (MAC), under the regulation of the Michigan High School Athletic Association (MHSAA).

==== Tennis ====
The boys' tennis team won the class A state championship in 1945 and 1946 and tied with Monroe High School in 1947. The girls' tennis team won the state championship every year from 1976 to 1986 (Tying in 1976,1977,1982 and 1985), 2008, 2012, and 2014.

=== Performing arts ===
Pointe Players is Grosse Pointe South's student theater organization.

GPSHS has four show choirs: Pointe Singers varsity choir, South Singers junior varsity, a traditional concert choir, and the extracurricular female-only Tower Belles. Pointe Singers, South Singers, and Concert Choir are competitive, with Pointe Singers winning a national-level competition in 2019.

=== Robotics ===
The South Sun Devils is the solar car team, competing since 2013 in The Solar Car Challenge in Dallas, Texas. The team fundraised, designed, built, and raced their street-legal car on Texas Motor Speedway followed by a road test challenge.

== Notable alumni ==
- Ayokay — producer and DJ
- Terrence Berg – Federal District Court Judge
- Scott Boman — Libertarian politician in Michigan
- Tony Fadell — Engineer, inventor, entrepreneur, and investor
- Reid Fragel – Former NFL player
- Chris Getz — General Manager of the Chicago White Sox and former MLB second baseman
- Edward Herrmann — Actor and narrator
- Will Johnson – cornerback for the Arizona Cardinals
- Alexander Koch — Actor
- Lisa LoCicero — Actress
- John 5 (John Lowery) — Guitarist
- Mike Murphy — Republican political consultant and NBC News and MSNBC contributor
- Michael Quatro — Prog-rock keyboardist and rock promoter
- Quinn XCII — singer and songwriter
- Brianne Nadeau – Councilmember on the Council of the District of Columbia
- Catie DeLoof – American swimmer
- Emilea Zingas – Figure skater
- John Brannon (musician) – American vocalist for the bands Negative Approach, Laughing Hyenas, and Easy Action.
- R.J. Ronquillo - Guitarist, YouTube personality
