= Defer Elementary School =

- U.S. National Register of Historic Places
- Michigan State Historic Site
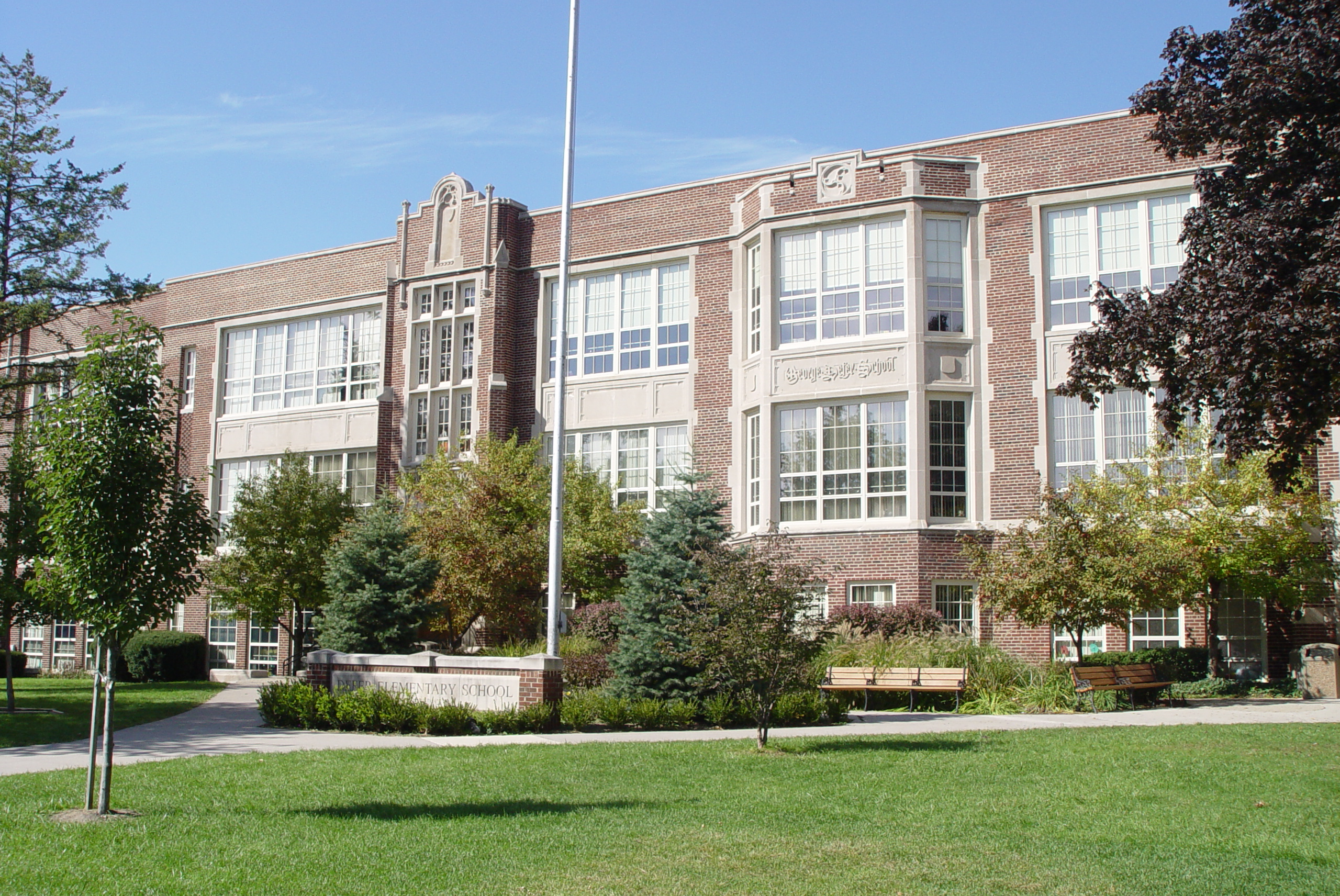
- Interactive map
- Location: 15425 Kercheval, Grosse Pointe Park, Michigan
- Coordinates: 42°22′59″N 82°56′14″W
- Built: 1924
- Architect: George J. Haas
- Architectural style: Tudor Revival
- NRHP reference No.: 01000458

Significant dates
- Added to NRHP: May 02, 2001
- Designated MSHS: August 29, 1996

Defer Elementary School is a school building located at 15425 Kercheval in Grosse Pointe Park, Michigan in Metro Detroit. It was designated a Michigan State Historic Site in 1996 and listed on the National Register of Historic Places in 2001. A part of the Grosse Pointe Public School System, it serves much of Grosse Pointe Park.

== History ==
In the first two decades of the 20th century, the once predominantly rural Grosse Pointe area transformed into a residential suburb of Detroit. In 1921, in response to the influx of families, five school districts in what is now the Grosse Pointe area were consolidated into Rural Agricultural District No. 1 (later renamed the Grosse Pointe Public School District). The first building constructed after consolidation was Defer Elementary School, built on the site of a rhubarb patch owned by Ludwig Meininger. Defer was designed by architect George J. Haas and completed in 1924. The school was named for George Defer, who was at the time the president of Grosse Pointe Park. At the time of construction, the surrounding neighborhoods were quickly growing, and by 1927 the school was overcrowded. An addition to the school was constructed in 1928.

== Description ==
Defer Elementary School is a three-story rectangular building built in the Tudor Revival style. This revival style was popular in Detroit and across the country in the years following World War I, and is symbolic of the prosperity of the era. The exterior is of brick with limestone detailing surrounding doors and windows. The doors are wood panelled with Gothic arches. The interior is decorated with Pewabic tile; in particular the kindergarten room contains a Pewabic fireplace and drinking fountain. The 1928 addition contains additional classrooms and a leaded glass conservatory.

== Modern use and feeder pattern ==
Defer Elementary School is still used by the Grosse Pointe Public School District as an elementary school, and is the oldest building in the district. Typical enrollment was 465 students, but as of 2010 that number had dropped to approximately 420.

Residents zoned to Defer are also zoned to Pierce Middle School in Grosse Pointe Park and Grosse Pointe South High School in Grosse Pointe Farms.
