= Grosse Pointe North High School =

Public high school in Grosse Pointe, Michigan

Location
- 707 Vernier Road; Grosse Pointe Woods, Michigan 48236-1527; United States of America; 42.436386°N 82.888350°W

Information
- Other names: North, Grosse Pointe North, GPN, GPNHS
- Type: Comprehensive public high school
- Opened: 1968; 58 years ago
- Status: Currently operational
- School district: Grosse Pointe Public School System
- NCES District ID: 2625740
- Superintendent: Jon Dean
- CEEB code: 231-801
- NCES School ID: 262574006230
- Principal: Kate Murray
- Teaching staff: 62.08 FTE
- Grades: 9-12
- Gender: Co-educational
- Enrollment: 1,007 (2023-2024)
  - Grade 9: 225
  - Grade 10: 257
  - Grade 11: 244
  - Grade 12: 274
  - Ungraded: 7
- Student to teacher ratio: 16.22
- Schedule type: Semester
- Schedule: 7 50-minute periods
- Area: 342,148 square feet
- Campus type: Suburban
- Song: "Grosse Pointe North Alma Mater"
- Athletics conference: Macomb Area Conference - White division
- Mascot: Norseman
- Nickname: Norsemen
- Rival: Grosse Pointe South High School Blue Devils
- Accreditation: Cognia
- ACT average: 22.5
- Publication: Harbinger (art and literary magazine)
- Newspaper: North Pointe (print); North Pointe Now (online)
- Yearbook: Valhalla
- Communities served: Grosse Pointe; Harper Woods
- Feeder schools: Parcells Middle School: Students from all elementary school zones; Brownell Middle School: Students only from Monteith elementary school zone
- Website: north.gpschools.org
- Last updated: March 31, 2022

Student assessments
- 2021–22 school year Change vs. prior year

M-STEP 11th grade proficiency rates (Science / Social Studies)
- Advanced %: 20.9 / 15.4
- Proficient %: 28.9 / 31.6
- PR. Proficient %: 12.1 / 41.5
- Not Proficient %: 38.1 / 11.5

Average test scores
- SAT Total: 1029.7 (▼ −44.7)

Grosse Pointe North High School is a public high school in Grosse Pointe Woods, Michigan, a suburb of Detroit. North is a four-year comprehensive high school with an enrollment of around 1,400 and expected 2016 graduating class of 350. Classes are in session for 182 days per year and the school day is from 8:00 AM to 3:05 PM.

The principal is Kate Murray; she won the 2015 Educators Voice Award. The assistant principals are Katy Vernier, Michelle Davis, and Geoffrey Harris Young. Davis is also the school's athletic director.

North consistently ranks among the nation's best high schools.

- North is ranked the 11th best public high school in Michigan on the 2017 Niche rankings.
- On The Washington Post's list of most challenging high schools, North is #14 in Michigan.
- Newsweek's list of top high schools places North #487 nationally.

The school opened in 1968 after Grosse Pointe High School was split into two schools, and Grosse Pointe North took the northern side of Grosse Pointe's students and Northeastern Harper Woods' students. It is a member of the Grosse Pointe Public School System.

== Communities served and feeder patterns ==
The school serves the following communities: all of Grosse Pointe Woods, the GPPSS section of Harper Woods, a small northwest section of Grosse Pointe Farms, and the Wayne County section of Grosse Pointe Shores.

Three elementary schools, Ferry, Mason, and Monteith, feed into GPNHS. All of the attendance boundary of Parcells Middle School and a section of the boundary of Brownell Middle School coincides with that of GPNHS.

== Athletics ==
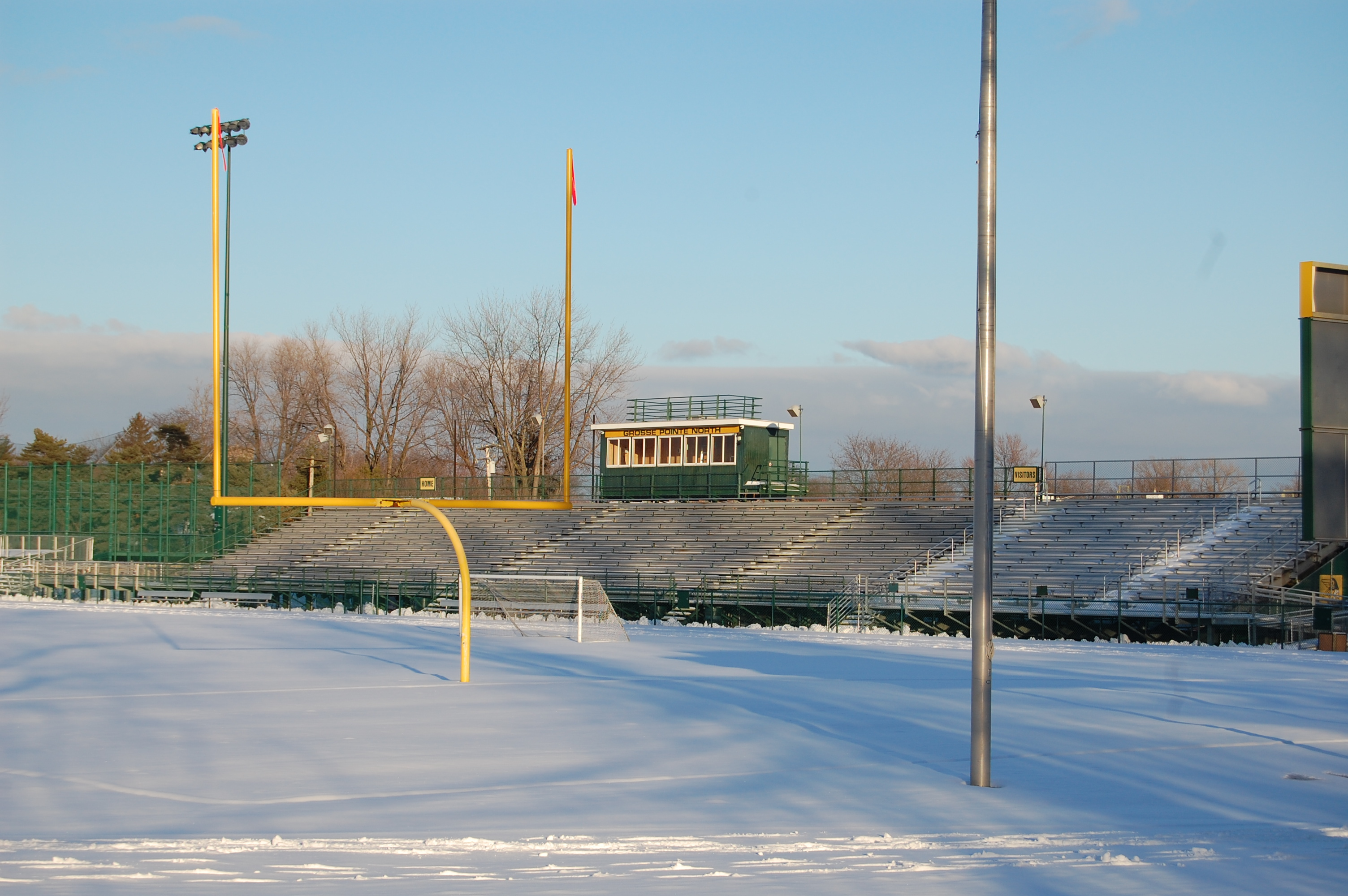
Grosse Pointe North athletic field

Boys' sports include: baseball, basketball, crew, cross country, football, golf, ice hockey, lacrosse, sailing, soccer, swimming and diving, tennis, track and field, and wrestling. Girls sports include: basketball, cheerleading, crew, cross country, dance team, field hockey, golf, gymnastics, ice hockey, lacrosse, sailing, soccer, softball, swimming and diving, tennis, track and field, and volleyball. Grosse Pointe North has won numerous state championship titles: Baseball (1980, 2006), Girls' Basketball (2008), Boys' Cross Country (1973, 1975, 1976, 1982), Boys' Hockey (2001, 2002), Girls' Lacrosse (1999), Girls' Swimming & Diving (1999), and Girls’ Soccer (2023).

== Extracurricular clubs ==
Grosse Pointe North's Radio Astronomy Team, the "RATz", under Ardis Herrold, are credited as being the first high school group to build its own radio telescope from scratch in the United States.

The Quiz Bowl team won the Class A Michigan High School State Championship in 2010 and participates in many NAQT tournaments. The team has attended the NAQT National High School Championship tournament (HSNCT).

== Notable alumni ==
- Gregg Alexander — Frontman of alternative rock band New Radicals
- Michael Bramos — Lega Basket Serie A basketball player with Reyer Venezia
- Robert Brooks Brown — Commanding general U.S. Army Pacific (USARPAC)
- Jared Lee Gosselin — Latin Grammy Award-winning producer
- David Legwand — Former NHL center with the Nashville Predators, Detroit Red Wings, Ottawa Senators, and Buffalo Sabres
- Andy Miele — NHL center with the Arizona Coyotes
- Mark Osler — Law professor at the University of St. Thomas School of Law
- Carly Piper — Olympic gold medal-winning swimmer at the 2004 Summer Olympics
- Corey Tropp — AHL right winger with the San Diego Gulls. Formerly with the Anaheim Ducks, Columbus Blue Jackets, and Buffalo Sabres of the NHL.
- Zach Werenski — NHL defenseman with the Columbus Blue Jackets
- Meg White — Drummer and singer of the White Stripes
- Brooke Castile - Figure Skater, 2007 U.S. Nationals Pairs Champion
- Karen Dionne - Author, The Marsh King's Daughter
