= Pere Gabriel Richard Elementary School =

- U.S. National Register of Historic Places
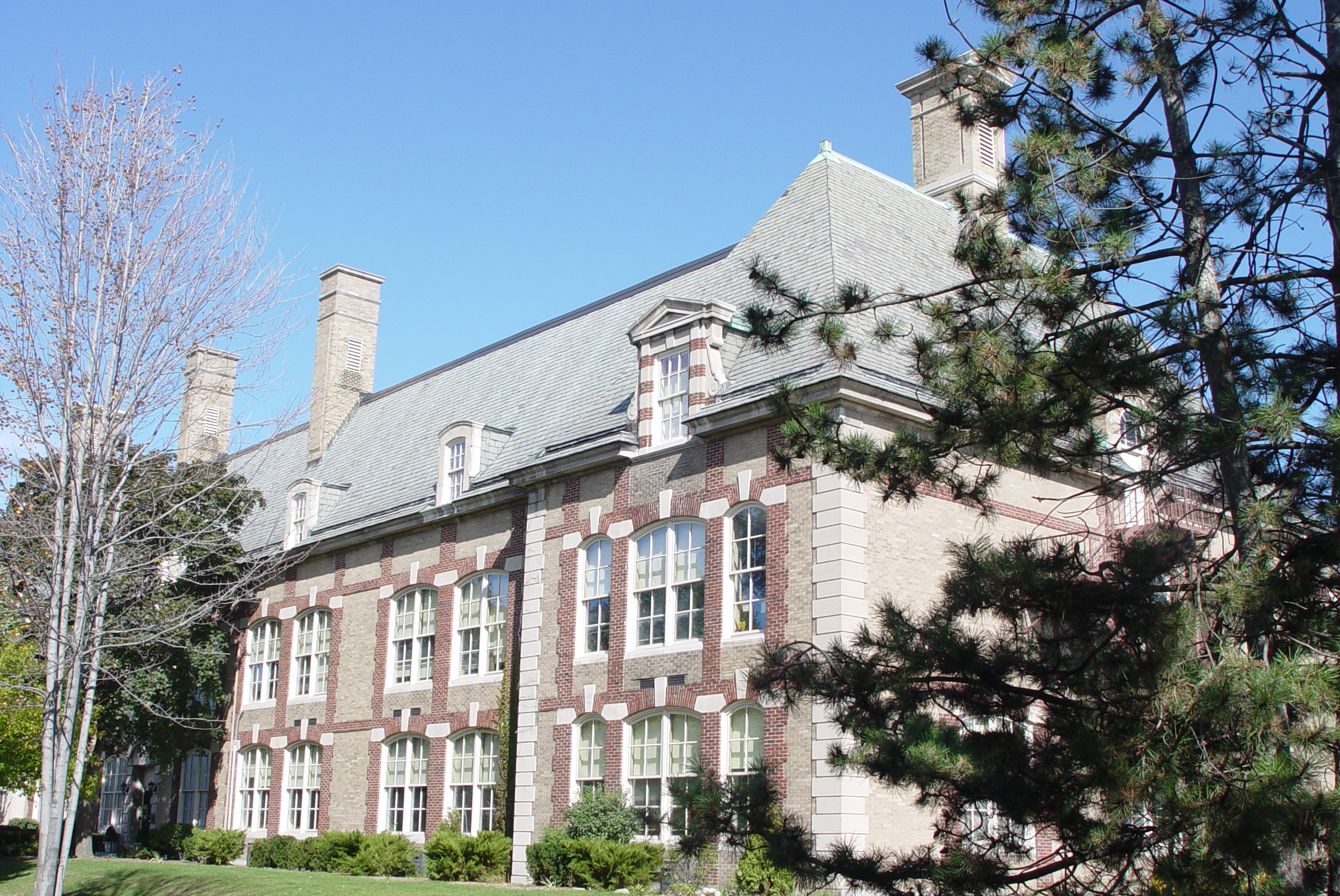

- Location within Michigan Location within the United States
- Interactive map
- Location: 176 McKinley Ave., Grosse Pointe Farms, Michigan
- Coordinates: 42°23′43″N 82°54′18″W
- Built: 1930
- Built by: A W Kutsche & Co
- Architect: Robert O. Derrick
- Architectural style: French Renaissance Revival
- NRHP reference No.: 94000752
- Added to NRHP: July 22, 1994

The Pere Gabriel Richard Elementary School is a public school located at 176 McKinley Avenue in the Detroit suburb of Grosse Pointe Farms, Michigan. The building was listed on the National Register of Historic Places in 1994.

== History ==
As the Grosse Pointes rapidly gained population in the 1920s, the Grosse Pointe Public School System constructed four new schools to serve the influx of students. The last of these was Pere Gabriel Richard Elementary School. In 1928, the school board approved the site for this school and issued a bond for its construction. In 1929, they commissioned architect Robert O. Derrick to design the building. The original design was twice as large as the current building, but when construction bids were high, Derrick scaled back the plans. A.W. Kutsche and Company was awarded the contract to construct the scaled-down building, and construction was completed in 1930, and opened in September of that year.

== Description ==
Pere Gabriel Richard Elementary School is a two and one-half story French Renaissance Revival brick building trimmed with stone. It has a high slate-covered mansard roof that contains a third story. A flat-roofed addition was added in 1962. The facade is asymmetrical, with an off-center main entrance set in a shallow projecting mass. A hip-roof mass at either end projects slightly.
