= Keyes (surname) =

Keyes is a common surname, derived from either an Anglo-Saxon tribe of Great Britain or a Celtic tribe of Ireland. Notable people with the name include:

- Alan Keyes (born 1950), American politician and diplomat
- Ancel Keyes, American scientist who invented K-rations and popularized the Mediterranean diet
- Baron Keyes, a title in the Peerage of the United Kingdom
- Bobby Keyes (disambiguation), multiple people
- BoPete Keyes (born 1997), American football player
- Charles Henry Keyes (1858–1925), American educator
- Charles R. Keyes (1871–1951), American archaeologist
- Charles Rollin Keyes (1864–1942), American geologist, ornithologist, and politician
- Christian Keyes (born 1975), American actor and model
- Corey Keyes, American psychologist
- Daniel Keyes (1927–2014), American author
- David Keyes (fl. 2010s–present), Israeli-American political staffer and activist
- Dan Keyes, American musician in the band Recover
- Dennis Keyes (born 1985), American professional football player
- Edward J. Keyes (1859–1929), American politician and farmer from Wisconsin
- Erasmus D. Keyes (1810–1895), American general
- Eugene C. Keyes (1900–1963), American politician from Michigan
- Evelyn Keyes (1916–2008), American actress
- Frances Parkinson Keyes (1885–1970), American author
- Geoffrey Charles Tasker Keyes VC (1917–1941), British Major killed in the raid on Rommel
- Geoffrey Keyes (1888–1967), major general in the U.S. Army during World War II
- George Keyes (1919–2010), American professional golfer
- Gregory Keyes (born 1963), science fiction and fantasy writer
- Henry Keyes (1810–1870), American politician and railroad executive from Vermont
- Henry W. Keyes (1863–1938), American politician from New Hampshire
- Homer Eaton Keyes (1875–1938), Dartmouth professor
- Hugh T. Keyes (1888–1963), American architect
- Israel Keyes (1978–2012), American serial killer
- James W. Keyes, American chief executive, formerly of 7-Eleven and Blockbuster Inc.
- Joe Keyes (disambiguation), multiple people
- Johnnie Keyes (1940–2018), early African-American pornographic film actor
- Josh Keyes (artist) (born 1969), American painter and printmaker
- Katherine Keyes (born 1980), American epidemiologist
- Ken Keyes (politician) (born 1930), Canadian politician from Ontario
- Ken Keyes Jr. (1921–1995), American author and lecturer
- Laurel Elizabeth Keyes (1907–1983), counselor
- Marcus Keyes (born 1973), American football player
- Marian Keyes (born 1963), Irish writer
- Maya Marcel-Keyes (born 1985), daughter of American politician and diplomat Alan Keyes
- Mary G. Keyes (1904–1984), American chemist
- Michael Keyes (1886–1959), Irish politician
- Orval Keyes (1913–1991), American politician from Nebraska
- Perley Keyes (1774–1834), American politician from New York
- Ralph Keyes (rugby union) (born 1961), Irish rugby player
- Ralph Keyes (author) (born 1945)
- Roger Keyes, 1st Baron Keyes (1872–1945), British admiral and hero
- Roswell K. Colcord (1839–1939), American politician from Nevada
- Sidney Keyes (1922–1943), English poet and soldier during World War II
- Stan Keyes (born 1953), Canadian politician from Ontario
- Thomas Keyes (1523–1571), Royal gatekeeper to Queen Elizabeth I of England
- Wade Keyes (1821–1879), Confederate politician and attorney from Alabama

== See also ==
- Kay (surname)
- Key (surname)
- Keys (surname)
