= Key (surname) =

Key is an English and Dutch-language surname.

Notable people with the surname include:

- Al Key (1905–1976), aviator and mayor of Meridian, Mississippi
- Adriaen Thomasz Key (c. 1544 – after 1589), Flemish painter
- Alexander Key (1904–1979), American science fiction writer
- Arden Key (born 1996), American football player
- Bailie Key (born 1999), American artistic gymnast, 2013 National Champion
- Berthold Wells Key (1895–1986), British Indian Army officer
- Braxton Key (born 1997), American basketball player
- Dana Key (1953–2010), American musician
- Danny Key (born 1977), English footballer
- David M. Key (1824–1900), US Senator from Tennessee
- David McK. Key (1900–1988), diplomat from Tennessee
- Devon Key (born 1997), American football player
- Ellen Key (1849–1926), Swedish difference feminist writer
- Francis Scott Key (1779–1843), author of the United States national anthem
- Fred Key (1909–1971), aviator
- James L. Key (1867–1939), lawyer and twice Mayor of Atlanta, Georgia
- Jaylen Key (born 2000), American football player
- Jennifer Key, South African mathematician
- Jimmy Key (born 1961), James Edward Key, former left-handed pitcher in Major League Baseball
- John Key (born 1961), former Prime Minister of New Zealand
- Sir John Key, 1st Baronet (1794–1858), Lord Mayor of London 1830–1832, MP for City of London 1832–1833
- John A. Key (1871–1954), American politician
- John Maurice Key (1905–1984), Bishop of Sherborne then Truro
- John Ross Key (1754–1821), American lawyer and judge
- Johnny Key (disambiguation)
  - Johnny Key (footballer) (born 1937), English soccer player
  - Johnny Key (sprinter) (born 2003), Samoan athlete
- Kathleen Key (1903–1954), American actress in the silent era, great-great-granddaughter of Francis Scott Key
- Keegan-Michael Key (born 1971), American actor, writer, and comedian
- Kelly Key (born 1983), Kelly de Almeida Afonso Freitas, Portuguese-Brazilian pop singer
- Kristin Key (born 1980), American comedian
- Laurence Key (1895–1971), English cricketer
- Lieven de Key (1560–1627), Dutch renaissance architect
- Philip Key (U.S. politician), a Representative of the State of Maryland in the United States Congress from 1791 to 1792.
- Philip Barton Key (U.S. politician), a Representative of the State of Maryland in the United States Congress from 1807 to 1812.
- Philip Barton Key (U.S. District Attorney), murder victim in a controversial nineteenth-century trial
- Rob Key (born 1979), English cricketer
- Robert Key (politician) (1945–2023), a British politician, the Conservative MP for Salisbury
- Ryan Key (born 1979), William Ryan Key, American rock musician of the pop punk band Yellowcard
- Samuel M. Key (born 1951), pen name of Charles de Lint, Canadian writer of Dutch origin
- Stephanie Key (born 1954), Australian politician and member of the South Australian House of Assembly
- Ted Key (1912–2008), Theodore Keyser, American cartoonist and writer, creator of the cartoon panel Hazel
- Teonni Key (born 2003), American basketball player
- Thomas Key (disambiguation), several people with the same name
  - Thomas Hewitt Key (1799–1875), English classical scholar
  - Thomas Marshall Key (1819–1869), American politician
  - Thomas Caius (died 1572), English academic and administrator
- Tim Key (born 1976), English actor, writer, and performance poet
- V. O. Key, Jr. (1908–1963), American political scientist and author
- Violet Key Jones (1883–1958), Anglo-Irish writer and suffragette
- Watt Key (born 1970), American writer
- Wilhelmine Key (1872–1955), American geneticist

== See also ==
- Key (disambiguation)
- Keyes (disambiguation)
- Keys (surname)
