= Keys (surname) =

Keys is an English surname with Old English and Celtic origin. Notable people with the surname include:

- Alicia Keys (born 1981), American musician
- Ancel Keys (1904–2004), American nutritionist
- Austin Keys (born 2002), American football player
- Bobby Keys (1943–2014), American saxophonist
- Carleth Keys, Venezuelan journalist
- Clement Keys (1864–1937), English football manager
- Clement Melville Keys (1876–1952), American financier
- Constance Keys (1886–1964), Australian nurse
- David Keys, British archaeological journalist
- Derek Keys (1931–2018), South African politician
- Howard Keys (1935–1971), American football player
- Jack Keys (1865–1890), English footballer
- John Keys (born 1956), British organist
- Karen Keys-Gamarra, American politician from Virginia
- Madison Keys (born 1995), American tennis player
- Margaret Sherratt Keys (1856–1942) British-born American porcelain painter; store proprietor
- Martha Keys (1930–2024), American politician
- Martha Jayne Keys (1892–1975), American Christian minister
- Richard Keys (born 1957), English sports presenter
- Ronald Keys (born 1945), U.S. Air Force general
- Samuel Keys (1771–1850), English china painter
- Samuel J. Keys (1847–1924), American politician and businessman
- Sean Keys (born 2003), American baseball player
- Tristen Keys, American football player
- William Keys (disambiguation)

== Fictional characters ==
- Patty Keys, a character in Ninjago

== See also ==
- Key (surname)
- Keyes (disambiguation)
