= Teys =

Teys is a surname. Notable people with the surname include:

- Aaron Teys (born 1993), Australian bowler
- Brendan Teys (born 1990), Australian basketball player

== See also ==
- Keys (surname)
- Tess (given name)
- Teys Australia, meat-processing company
- Teyss, river
