= John Key (disambiguation) =

John Key (born 1961) was the prime minister of New Zealand, 2008–2016.

John Key may also refer to:

- Sir John Key, 1st Baronet (1794–1858), lord mayor of London 1830–1832, MP for City of London 1832–1833
- John A. Key (1871–1954), American politician
- John Ross Key (1754–1821), American lawyer and judge
- John Ross Key (artist) (1832–1920), American frontier landscapes artist
- John Maurice Key (1905–1984), bishop of Sherborne then Truro

== See also ==
- John Keys (disambiguation)
- Johnny Key (disambiguation)
- John Keay (born 1941), English journalist and writer
- John P. Kee (born 1962), American gospel singer and pastor
