= Johnny Key =

Johnny Key may refer to:

- Johnny Key (footballer)
- Johnny Key (sprinter)

== See also ==
- Johnny Keyes (disambiguation)
- John Key (disambiguation)
