= John Keys =

John Keys may refer to:

- John Caius (1510–1573), English physician and second founder of the present Gonville and Caius College, Cambridge
- John Keys (organist) (born 1956), British organist
- John W. Keys (1941–2008), Commissioner of the United States Bureau of Reclamation

== See also ==
- Johnnie Keyes (1940–2018), American pornographic actor
- John Key (disambiguation)
