= Gregor S. and Elizabeth B. Affleck House =

House in Bloomfield Hills, Michigan

- U.S. National Register of Historic Places
- Michigan State Historic Site
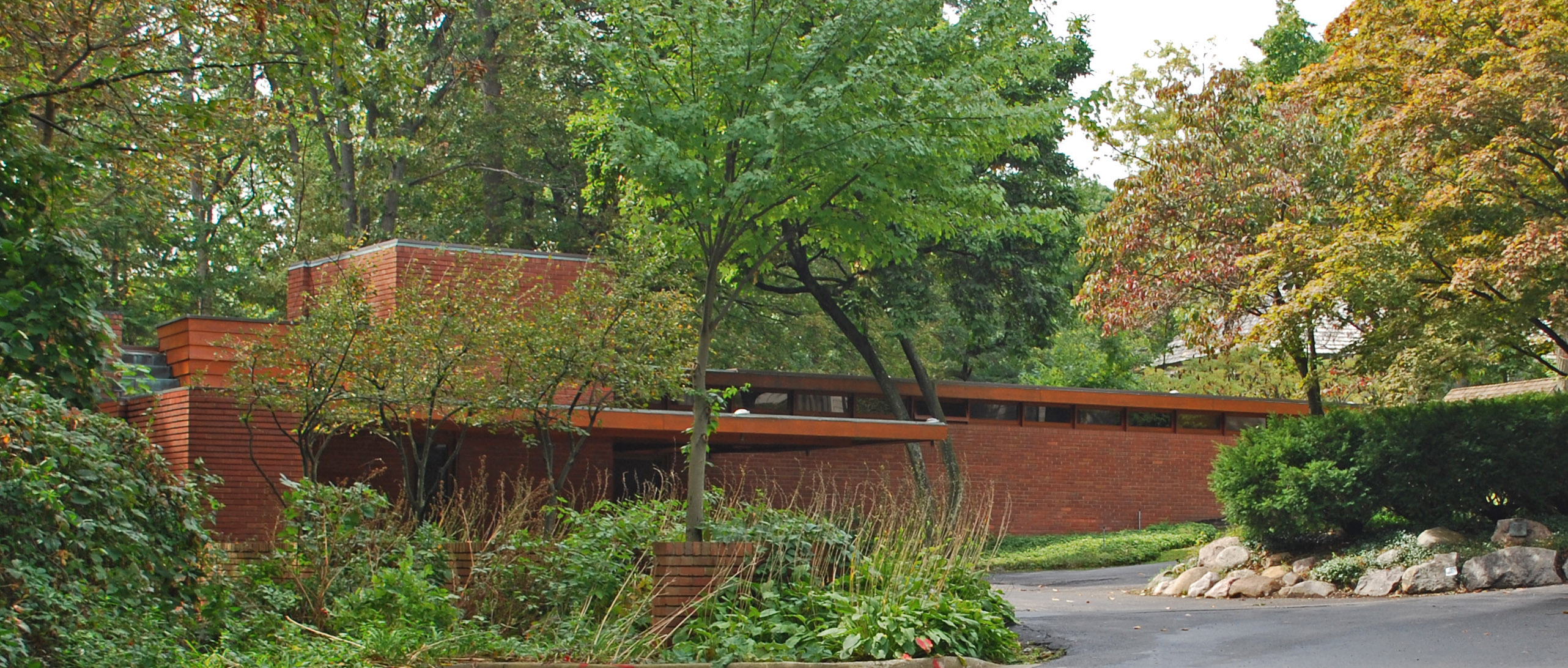

- Location within Michigan
- Interactive map
- Location: Bloomfield Hills, Michigan
- Coordinates: 42°35′17″N 83°14′59″W
- Built: 1940
- Built by: Harold Turner
- Architect: Frank Lloyd Wright
- Architectural style: Usonian
- NRHP reference No.: 85003005
- Added to NRHP: October 3, 1985

The Gregor S. and Elizabeth B. Affleck House, also known as the Affleck House, is a Frank Lloyd Wright-designed Usonian home in Bloomfield Hills, Michigan, in Metro Detroit. It is one of only about 25 pre-World War II Usonians to be built. It is owned by Lawrence Technological University. The house was listed on the National Register of Historic Places on October 3, 1985.

== History ==
Gregor S. Affleck was born in Chicago and became a chemical engineer. Affleck was familiar with Frank Lloyd Wright's architectural style, having spent much of his youth near Spring Green, Wisconsin, and Wright's family home. Gregor's wife Elizabeth was particularly fond of Wright's Fallingwater, so when the couple wanted to build their own house in 1940, they commissioned Wright to design this house. The site was a unique lot, densely wooded, with no level ground, which allowed Wright to explore and refine his design for a home on sloping ground. The construction was finished in 1941.

The Afflecks later commissioned Wright to construct a second house on the adjoining lot, known as the Pergola House. In 1978, the Affleck House was donated by the family to Lawrence Technological University. The university committed to restoring and preserving the house, and it is used as a teaching resource for the university's College of Architecture and Design faculty and students.

== Description ==
The Affleck House is a Usonian house constructed of brick and cypress. It is sited in a natural amphitheater on a sloping lot. The main entrance opens into an entry foyer, which is connected to a main skylit loggia. A light well in the floor of the loggia opens onto a stream below. The loggia extends into the living/dining space, which is cantilevered out over the small stream. The living room revolves around a large fireplace and is adjoined by the dining area. A small kitchen is a two-story space, with a small stairway leading downward to the lower level bedroom. The main bedroom wing is raised half a story above the loggia, with a hallway/gallery on one side and three bedrooms and two bathrooms.

== Gallery ==
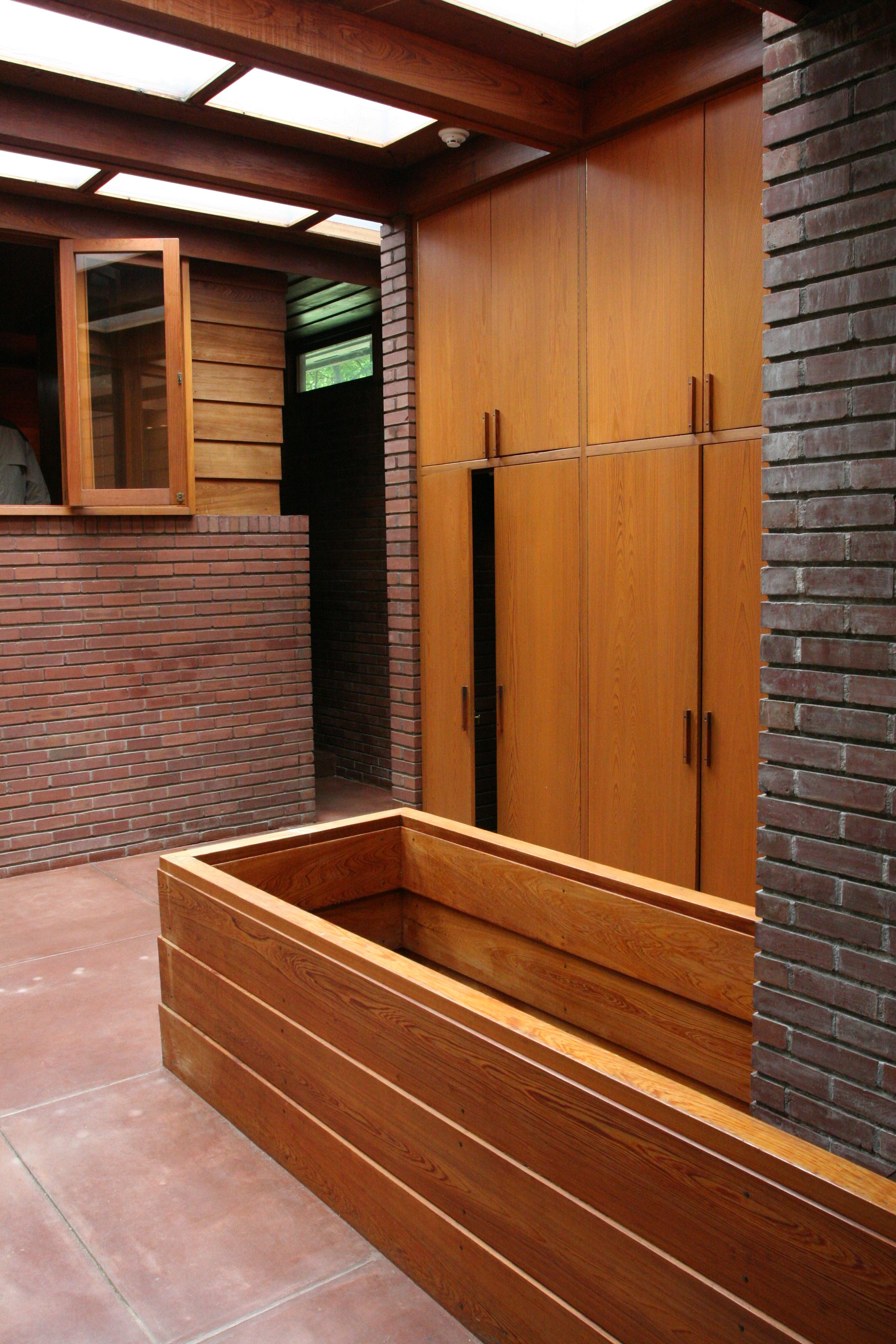

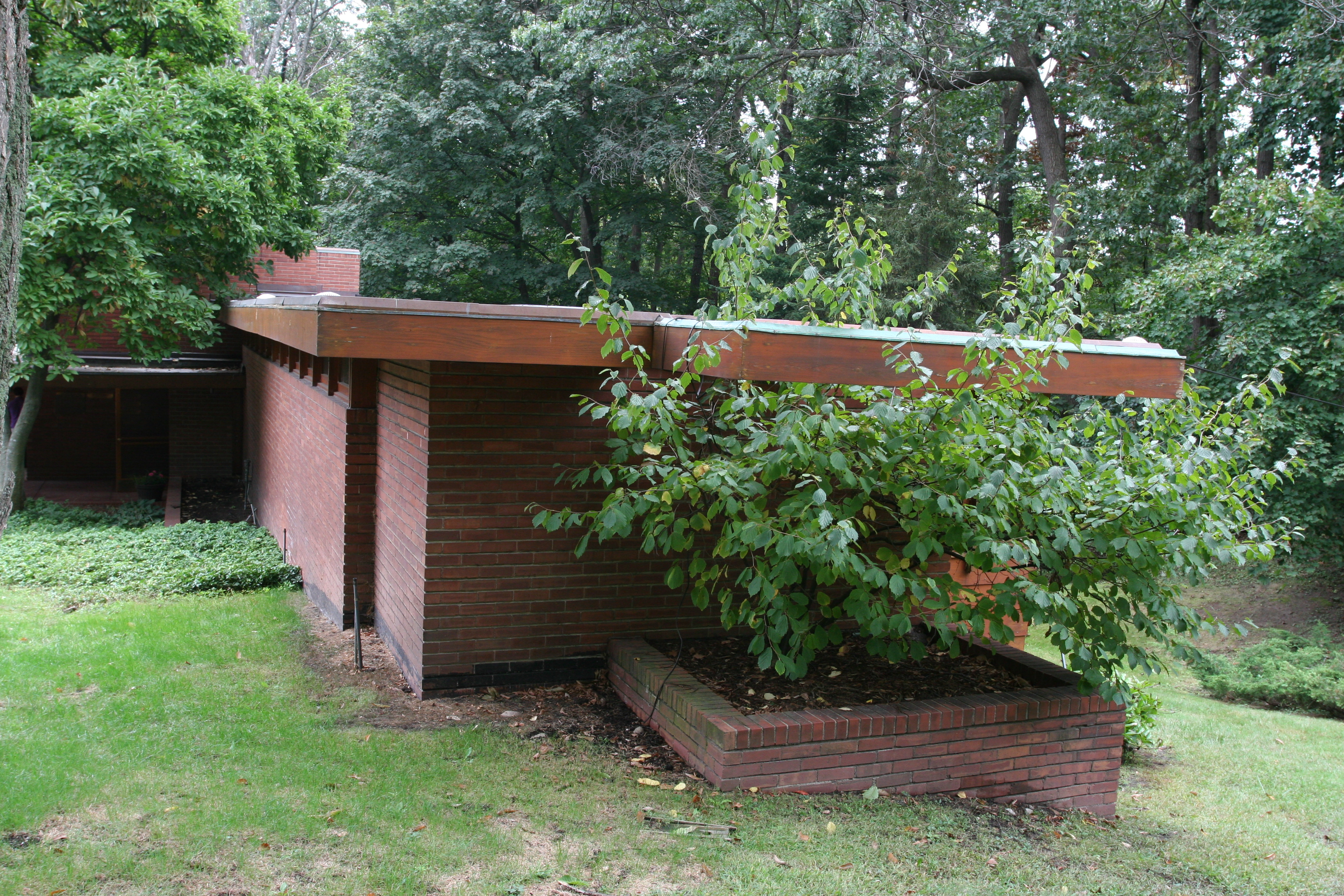

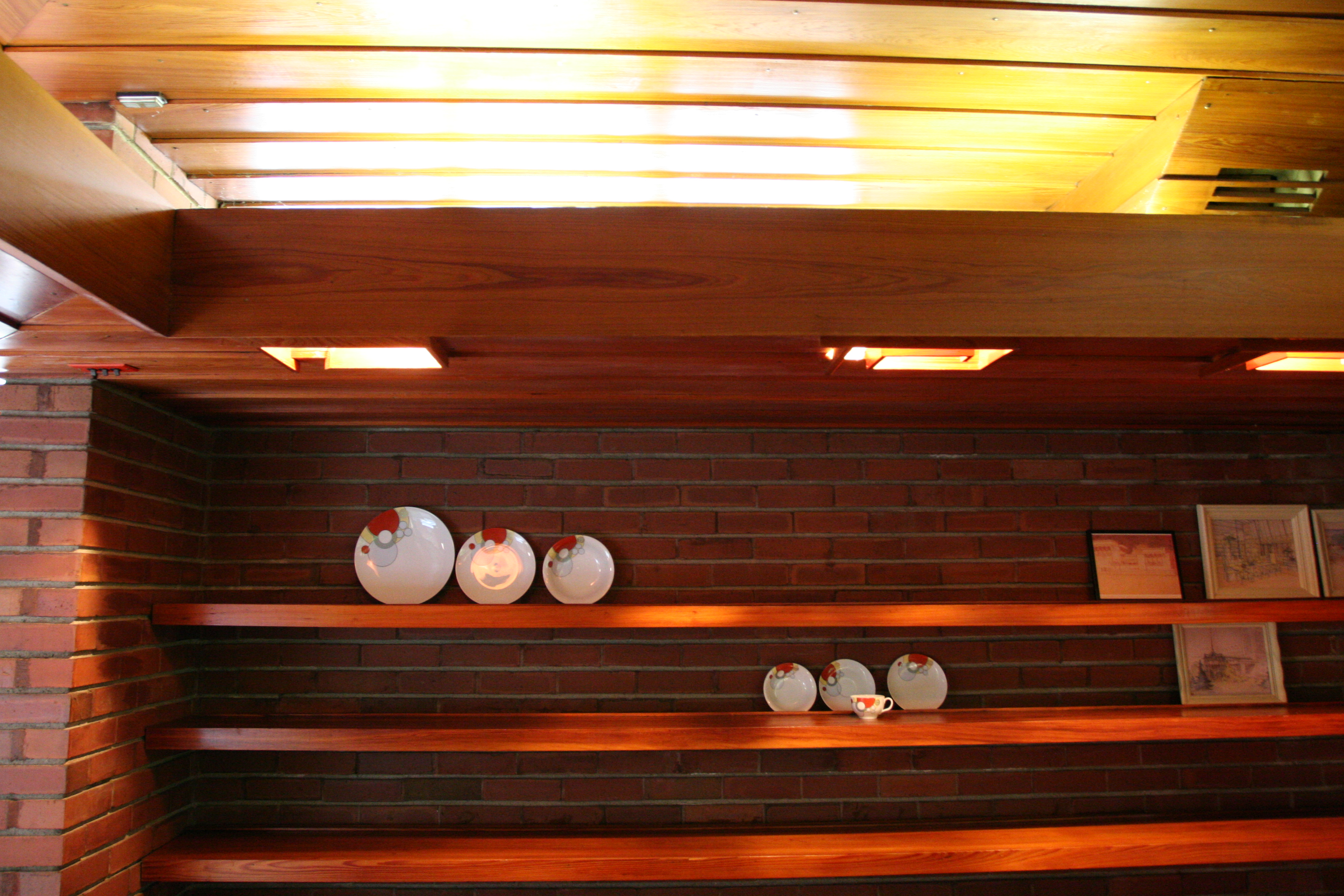

== See also ==
- List of Frank Lloyd Wright works
- National Register of Historic Places listings in Oakland County, Michigan
