= Laurence Key =

English cricketer

Laurence Henry Key (5 May 1895 – 18 April 1971) played first-class cricket for Somerset in eight matches between 1919 and 1922. He was born in Lincoln and died in Taunton, Somerset.

Key was a lower-order left-handed batsman and a slow left-arm spin bowler, which was not a useful skill to have in a team dominated by the bowling of Jack White, also slow left-arm. He played in three matches in 1919, making his highest score, 30, in the second of these, against Worcestershire. Four more games followed with less success in 1921 and to the end of that season he had bowled just a single over in first-class cricket. In 1922, however, in the match against Leicestershire at Aylestone Road, Leicester, White was not playing and Key was given 17.1 overs, and took two wickets, the only dismissals of his first-class career. This was, however, his last match in first-class cricket.
