= William Keys =

William Keys may refer to:

- William Keys (Australian Army officer)
- William M. Keys, United States Marine Corps general
- Bill Keys (trade unionist)
- Billy Keys, American basketball player and coach
