= Joe Keyes =

Joe Keyes may refer to:

- Joe Keyes (musician) (1907–1950), American jazz trumpeter
- Joe Keyes (rugby league) (born 1995), Irish rugby league footballer
