= Keyes =

Keyes may refer to:

- Keyes (surname), including a list of people with the name
- Keyes, California, a place in the United States
- Keyes, Oklahoma, a place in the United States
- Captain Jacob Keyes and Miranda Keyes, characters in Halo
- Sammy Keyes, fictional character in novels by Wendelin Van Draanen

== See also ==
- Cays, often pronounced "keys"
- Key (disambiguation)
