= Thomas Key =

Thomas Key may refer to:

- Thomas Hewitt Key (1799–1875), English classical scholar
- Thomas Marshall Key (1819–1869), American politician
- Thomas Key (colonel), 19th-century American colonel
- Thomas Key (instrument maker), 19th-century English serpent maker
- Thomas Key (planter), 17th-century American planter
- Thomas Caius (died 1572), English academic and administrator
