= Laurel Elizabeth Keyes =

American poet

Laurel Elizabeth Keyes (February 3, 1907 – 1983) was an American writer, lecturer and counselor. She is best known for her early works on sound therapy and weight management.

== Biography ==
Keyes was a writer from an early age. Over the years, she wrote stories, articles and poetry for magazines and newspapers. She received her education in the transpersonal field from a variety of Eastern and Western sources, having started her studies in Comparative Religions and philosophy when she was 19. She lectured and conducted retreats for churches of all the major religions, and for more than 16 years lectured for adult education in the public school system. Her writings reflect a practical blending of popular in-depth methods of modern psychology and the ancient traditional teachings of metaphysics and philosophy.

In 1952 Mrs. Keyes founded Overweight Overcomers International, one of the first self-help groups dedicated to problems of obesity, and wrote the book How to Win the Losing Fight, a weight-control guide that helped thousands to better health. In 1963 she founded the Order of Fransisters and Brothers, a lay order following the outline of the well-known prayer beginning "Lord, make me an instrument." It is a non-profit, inter-religious movement, sponsoring silent retreats, study and research. Keyes' most popular book is her 1973 work Toning: The Creative Power of the Voice, which is cited by sound therapists (unfortunately there exist two diverging editions of that book; see "Published works"). Her legacy also includes the Restorium, a chapel and retreat house in the mountains near Denver. Keyes resided in Denver, Colorado until her death in 1983.

The sound and toning healing work of Keyes is again being carried on throughout the world in the integration of cymatics (sound) and light therapies. In the form of "giving voice" to bodily ailments, it has been integrated by Manhattan oncologist Dr. Mitchell L. Gaynor. Keyes' work has inspired VibrationsHeal, an ongoing support and toning study group based in Burlington, Vermont. VibrationsHeal teaches bi-weekly outreach meetings and seminar programs on the use of toning to maintain optimum health and restore health from many types of ailments and situations.

== Published works ==
- Toning: The Creative Power of the Voice

There are 2 editions of that one. Both published by devorss. The 2nd edition however, published with Don Campbell as co-author, does widely not reflect Keyes original words, but offers a distorted version of "Toning". If you want the original Keyes, keep to the 1st Edition with Keyes alone being author.

- Seeing Through Your Illusions
- How to Win the Losing Fight
- What's Eating You?
- Mystery of Sex
- Living Can Be Fun
- Close the Door Softly as You Go
- Sundial
- Knowing God
- The Angel Who Remembered
- The Gift
- I Am a Child
- Seedlings from the Vine
- Transform Your Life
- Dust Thou Art
- Discussion of Happiness
- The Person I Was Meant to Be
- Let Your Light So Shine
- The Lost Village
- The Way to the Village
- Order of Fransisters and Franbrothers
- The Fransister Communion
- Fransister Foods
