= Samuel Keys =

Samuel Keys (1771 – 1850) was an English china painter.

== Life ==
His family background is not known. Keys was one of the principal gilders and china-painters in the Derby china factory under William Duesbury the elder, to whom Keys was articled. He was highly regarded, and much of the success of the china, especially the figures in the Dresden style, was owing to his skill in decoration.

On 3 August 1795, in Dronfield, Derbyshire, he married Hannah Grattan.

Keys left Derby some years before the close of the factory, and worked under Minton in the Staffordshire Potteries district. He returned later to Derby, where he died in 1850, in his eightieth year. Keys preserved his delicacy of execution to the last. He collected materials for the history of the Derby china factory, which form the foundation of subsequent accounts.

== His sons ==
Keys left three sons, all apprenticed at the Derby factory. John Keys (bapt. 1797, died 1825) became a skilled flower-painter in water-colour, and teacher of that art.

Edward Keys (bapt. 1795) left Derby about 1826, and went to work for Minton, Daniell, and others in the Staffordshire Potteries. He was known for his figurines.

Samuel Keys the younger (bapt. 1804) was noted for his figurines of leading actors. He left Derby in 1830, and went to the Potteries, where he worked for several firms. He set up, with John Mountford, a firm producing Parian ware.
