= Alvan Macauley =

American businessman (1872–1952)

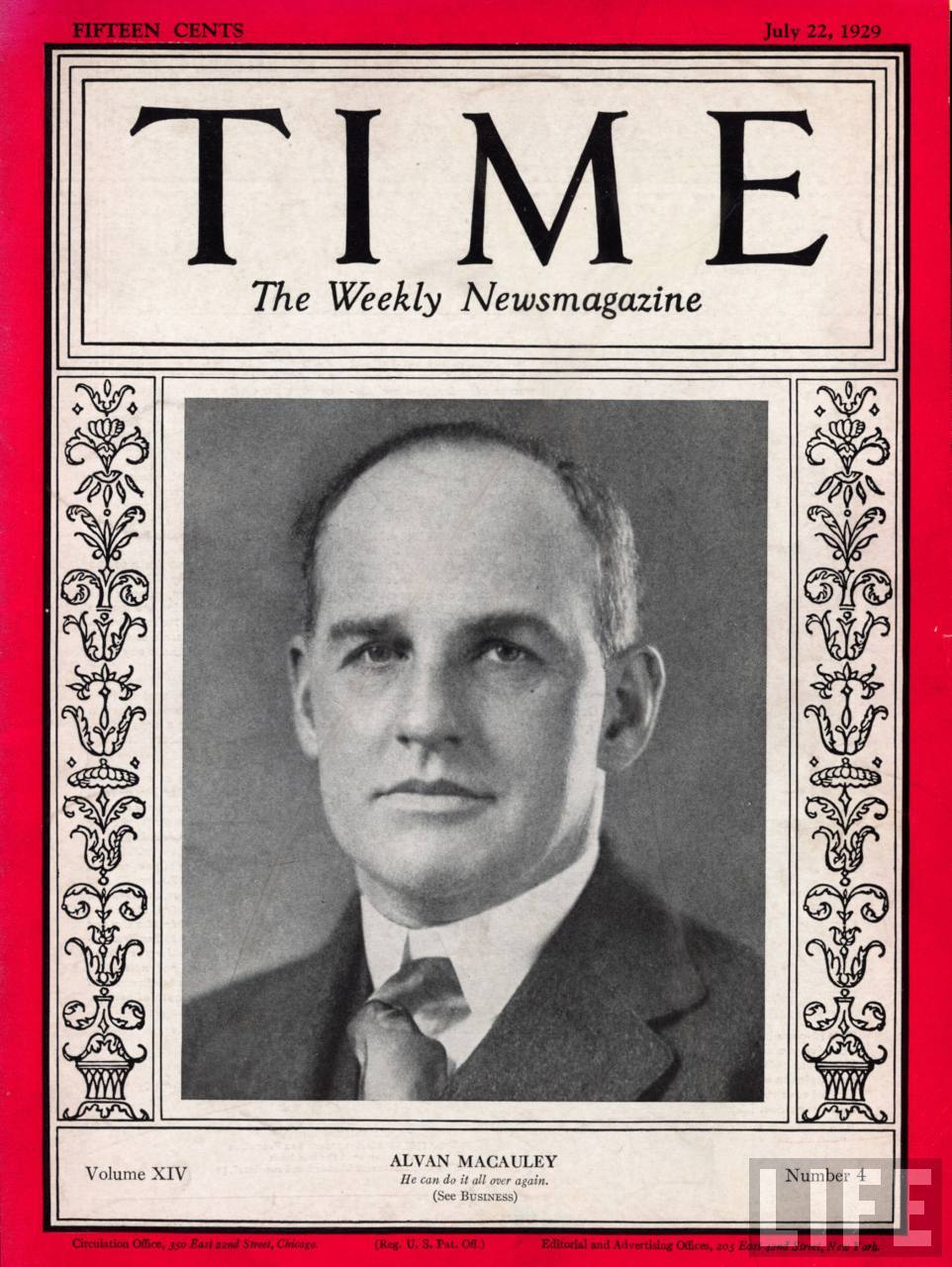
- Time magazine cover from July 22, 1929
- Born: James Alvan Macauley; January 17, 1872; Wheeling, West Virginia
- Died: January 16, 1952 (aged 79); Clearwater, Florida
- Occupations: attorney, president of Packard Motor Car Company
- Spouse: Estelle Littlepage
- Children: Alvan Macauley, Edward Macauley and Mary Macauley Whiting
- Parent(s): James A. Macauley and Rebecca Jane Mills

James Alvan Macauley Sr. (1872–1952) was the president of Packard Motor Car Company] from 1916 until 1939.

== Early life and education ==
Alvan, as he preferred to be called, was born in Wheeling, West Virginia, to James A. Macauley and Rebecca Jane Mills. Macauley's father was a veteran of the American Civil War and was imprisoned for nine months in a Confederate war prison camp. The elder Macauley became the first state treasurer for West Virginia after the Civil War.

The Macauleys moved to Washington D.C. where Alvan was educated in the public school system. Alvan attended Lehigh University in Pennsylvania and gained an engineering degree. He also graduated from Columbian College (now known as George Washington University) with a law degree. He took a job as a patent attorney with the National Cash Register Company. Macauley married Estelle Littlepage in 1895.

== Company head ==
Macauley moved to St. Louis in 1901 to become the head of American Arithmometer Company. Macauley revitalized the company and by 1905 sought to expand the operation. He set his eye on a certain alley, but the city was unwilling to give it to him, as his predecessor, who had left the company on angry terms, still had political pull in the city and was blocking the move. Macauley responded by traveling to Detroit, securing an alley there, and returning to St. Louis. At night after business hours, he had the entire factory loaded onto boxcars and shipped to Michigan. The next morning, city officials awoke to find the factory gone. Macauley led American Arithmometer — which would become Burroughs Adding Machine Company — for five years in Detroit. In 1910 he was hired as general manager of Packard by Henry Bourne Joy.

== Packard president ==
Alvan Macauley became the president of Packard in 1916. He oversaw an era when Packard was the leader in the luxury car market. He hired Jesse Vincent, an engineer who led the technical development at Packard. Packard's "twin-six" twelve-cylinder engine enabled the automaker to step away from the competition and establish itself as an industry leader throughout the 1910s and 1920s. An eight-cylinder car that began production in 1923 became a favorite of European royalty and among the wealthiest American consumers.

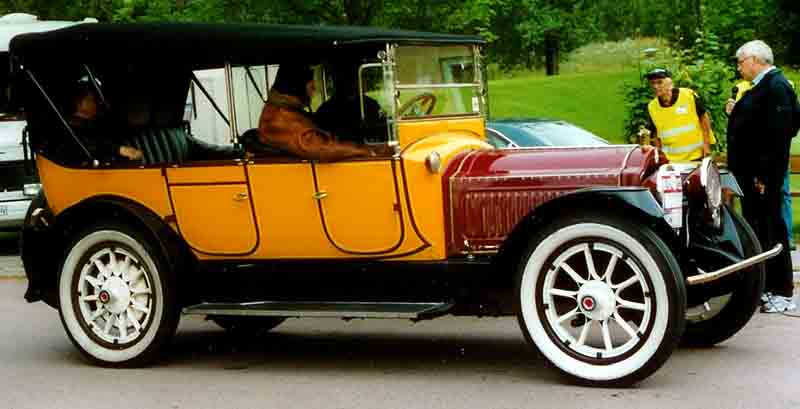
Packard Twin-Six Touring, 1916

The Great Depression devastated the luxury car market. Macauley responded by seeking a foothold in the mid-priced car market. He gained it in 1935 when he hired a team of engineers from Ford Motor Company, General Motors, and Chrysler Corporation, who helped Packard produce a car that sold for $980 – $650 less than any Packard automobile. The success of the lower-priced car ended the financial crisis at Packard.

Macauley stepped down as president of Packard in 1939. He stayed on as chairman of the board until 1948. Macauley was instrumental in the company's decision to produce the powerful Rolls-Royce Merlin engine, which was a key factor in the success of the famous P-51 Mustang fighter in World War II. Packard continued to produce mid-priced cars in the years following World War II. Macauley resigned from Packard in 1948 after the company lost its place as the leading luxury-car maker in America to Cadillac.

== Organizations ==
Macauley served as president of the American Automobile Manufacturers Association and the National Automobile Chamber of Commerce. He appeared on the cover of Time magazine in 1929 after testifying before the Senate Finance Committee's subcommittee at the behest of Pennsylvania Senator David A. Reed. Time magazine's biography of Macualey noted that he was an avid golfer and woodworker, and an excellent marksman.

Macauley had several personality quirks including a dislike of people who jingled the change in their pockets or had gold fillings in their teeth. A sign over his office door proclaimed: "Important If True." Often his truths were the only ones that counted at Packard.

Macauley died on January 16, 1952, in Clearwater, Florida, from an attack of uremic poisoning and pneumonia. He was survived by his wife, three children, ten grandchildren and fifteen great-grandchildren.
