= Bobby Keyes =

Bobby or Robert Keyes may refer to:

- Bobby Keyes (gridiron football) (born 1982), American player of Canadian football
- Bobby Keyes (guitarist) (born 1953), American guitarist and songwriter
- Robert Keyes (footballer) (1910–1970), Scottish footballer (Falkirk FC)
- Bobby Keyes (rugby league) (1942–2022), Australian rugby league player
- Robert Keyes (c. 1565–1606), member of the group of English Catholics who planned the failed Gunpowder Plot
- Robert Keyes (baseball) (1912–?), Negro league baseball player
- Bob Keyes (1936–1978), American football player

== See also ==
- Bobby Keys (1943–2014), American rock saxophone player
- Rob Keys, American college football coach
