= Johnny Keyes =

Johnny Keyes may refer to:

- Johnny Keyes and the Magnificents, an American doo wop group from the 1950s
- Johnnie Keyes (1940–2018), African-American pornographic movie actor and amateur boxer
