= David F. Tolin =

American clinical psychologist

- Born: August 7, 1968 (age 58); King County, Washington, U.S.
- Other name: David Tolin
- Education: University of Washington (B.A.); University of Arkansas (Ph.D.)
- Employer(s): Institute of Living; Yale University

David F. Tolin (born August 7, 1968) is an American clinical psychologist.

== History ==
Born in Washington state, Tolin graduated from the University of Washington in Seattle with a bachelor's degree in psychology in 1990. He earned a Ph.D. in clinical psychology from the University of Arkansas. Tolin is board-certified in clinical psychology by the American Board of Professional Psychology.

In 2000, Tolin founded the Anxiety Disorders Center at the Institute of Living, where he continues to serve as director. He is also an adjunct professor of psychiatry at Yale School of Medicine.

In 2014, Tolin served as president of the Society of Clinical Psychology, a division of the American Psychological Association. In 2020–2021, Tolin served as president of the Association for Behavioral and Cognitive Therapies.

== Academic contributions ==
Tolin is an expert on cognitive behavioral therapy. He has published more than 200 scientific journal articles related to anxiety disorders, cognitive behavioral therapy, and related topics. He serves as a principal investigator for the National Institutes of Health, and has been a member of their scientific review committees.

Tolin has published five books. Buried in Treasures: Help for Compulsive Acquiring, Saving, and Hoarding, cowritten with Randy O. Frost and Gail Steketee, helps people assess their hoarding behaviors.

Treating Trichotillomania: Cognitive-Behavioral Therapy for Hairpulling and Related Problems is a book about trichotillomania, written primarily for medical providers.

Face Your Fears: A Proven Plan to Beat Anxiety, Panic, Phobias, and Obsessions helps the reader begin an exposure program.

Doing CBT: A Comprehensive Guide to Working with Behaviors, Thoughts, and Emotions explains how cognitive-behavioral therapy can be effective help the behavioral, cognitive, and emotional components of some psychological issues.

CBT for Hoarding Disorder: A Group Therapy Program Therapist's Guide describes how to lead a comprehensive cognitive-behavioral therapy program for individuals with hoarding disorder. It was cowritten with Blaise L. Worden, Bethany M. Wootton, and Christina M. Gilliam.

== Popular media ==
Tolin was featured on the television series My Shopping Addiction, which was aired on Oxygen in 2013.

Tolin hosted the television series The OCD Project, which was aired on VH1 in 2010. Tolin was the original psychologist on the A&E series Hoarders.

Tolin has also made multiple appearances on other television programs such as The Oprah Winfrey Show, Anderson Live, Good Morning America, Today, and The Dr. Oz Show.

== Works ==
- Tolin, David F. Buried in Treasures: Help for Compulsive Acquiring, Saving, and Hoarding. ISBN 978-0195300581. Oxford University Press. 2007.
- Franklin, Martin E.; Tolin, David F. Treating Trichotillomania: Cognitive-Behavioral Therapy for Hairpulling and Related Problems (Series in Anxiety and Related Disorders). ISBN 978-1441924254. Springer. 2010.
- Tolin, David F. Face Your Fears: A Proven Plan to Beat Anxiety, Panic, Phobias, and Obsessions. ISBN 978-1118016732. Wiley. 2012.
- Tolin, David F. Doing CBT: A Comprehensive Guide to Working with Behaviors, Thoughts, and Emotions. ISBN 978-1462527076. The Guilford Press. 2016.
- Tolin, David F.; Worden, Blaise L.; Wootton, Bethany M.; Gilliam, Christina M. CBT for Hoarding Disorder: A Group Therapy Program Therapist's Guide. ISBN 978-1119159230. Wiley-Blackwell. 2017.
