= House at 140 and 144 Retreat Avenue =

Historic house in Connecticut, United States

- U.S. National Register of Historic Places
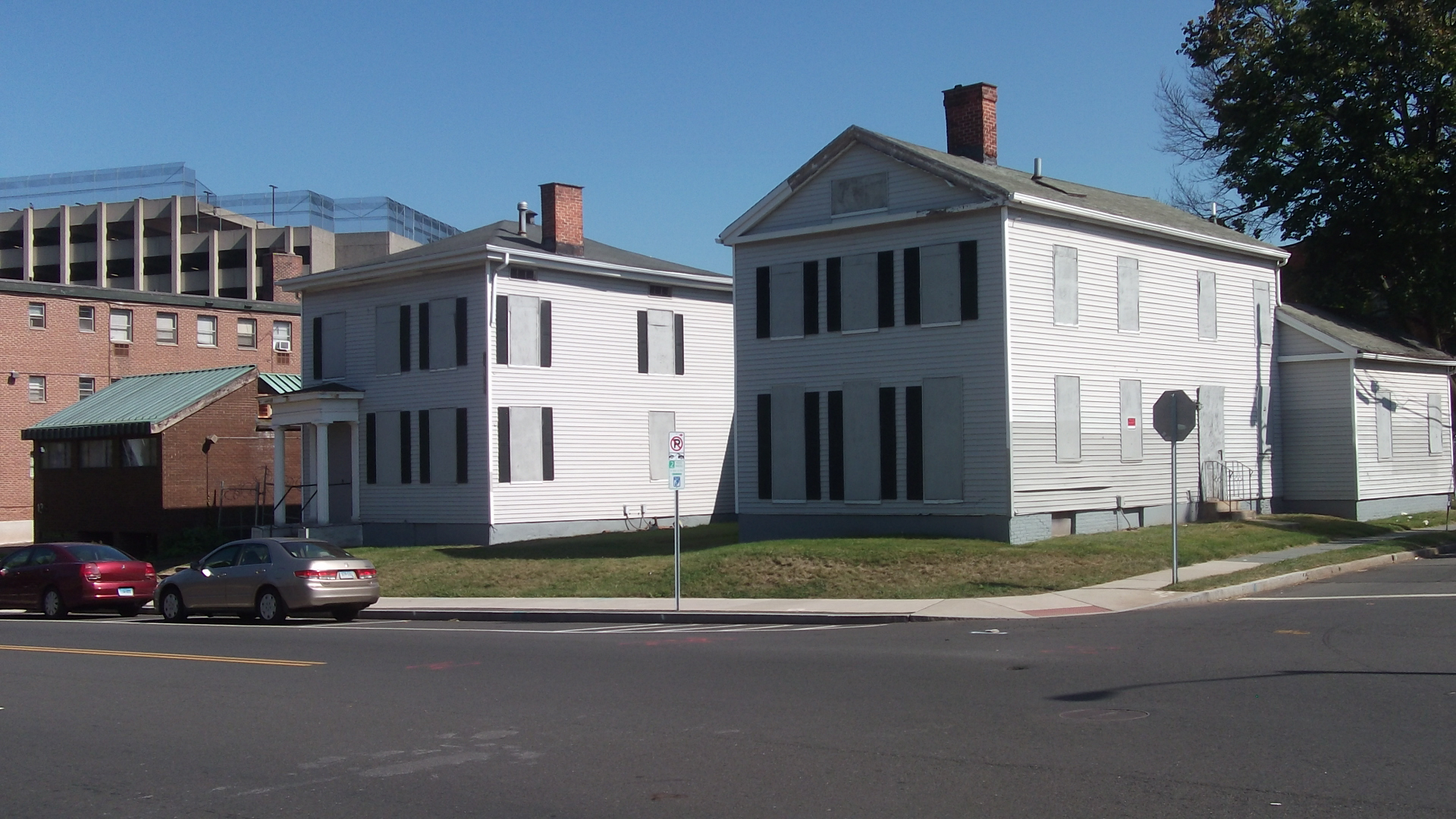

- Location within Connecticut Location within the United States
- Location: 140 and 144 Retreat Avenue, Hartford, Connecticut
- Coordinates: 41°45′9″N 72°40′49″W
- Area: less than one acre
- Built: 1845
- Architectural style: Greek Revival
- NRHP reference No.: 82004412
- Added to NRHP: February 25, 1982

140 and 144 Retreat Avenue is a historic conjoined pair of houses in Hartford, Connecticut. Built in 1844 and 1851, the two houses are the only surviving reminders of the street's 19th-century streetscape. They were listed on the National Register of Historic Places in 1982.

== Description and history ==
Retreat Avenue is a historically old road, connecting Hartford and Farmington in the 17th century. Its name derives from a facility for treatment of the insane that opened in the 1820s, that now operates as The Institute of Living, just southwest of numbers 140 and 144 on the south side of the road. The institute is now part of Hartford Hospital, whose main campus stands across the street. The pair of Greek Revival houses present a marked contrast to this institutional setting. They occupy adjacent lots just east of the junction of Retreat Avenue and Essex Street. Both houses are 2 1/2 stories in height, and of wood-frame construction finished in clapboards. Number 140 is the more easterly of the two: it has a hip roof, and its main entrance is sheltered by a flat-roof portico with fluted Doric columns. A two-story ell extends to its rear. Number 144 stands at the street corner, and has a gabled roof with an oblong multipane window in the gable pediment. The main entrance is on the four-bay side facing Essex Street, in the center-right bay, and lacks adornment. The two buildings are joined by a single-story wood-frame hyphen near the rear of the main blocks.

144 Retreat Avenue was built in 1845 on land owned by Joseph Barnes, and was apparently built by members of the Camp family, local builders and joiners. 140 Retreat Avenue was built sometime between 1851 and 1856, when it was owned by Bogardus Beardslee, a clothier who worked downtown. Although both of the adjacent medical institutions existed at the time, the blocks of Retreat Avenue and Essex Avenue were basically residential until after World War II, when expansion pressures from the hospitals resulted in the demolition of most of the housing there for commercial hospital-related uses.

== See also ==
- National Register of Historic Places listings in Hartford, Connecticut
