= Hoarders (TV series) =

American documentary reality television series

- Genre: Documentary; Reality show
- Starring: Vincent Mcdonald
- Country of origin: United States
- Original language: English
- No. of seasons: 16
- No. of episodes: 164 (list of episodes)

Production
- Executive producers: Courtney LeMarco; Erik Bernard; Dave Severson; Andrew Berg; David McKillop; Elaine Frontain Bryant; George Butts; Jessica Morgan; Matt Chan; Mike Kelly
- Camera setup: Multiple
- Running time: 42–85 minutes
- Production company: TLG Motion Pictures

Original release
- Network: A&E (Seasons 1-6, 8-present); Lifetime (Season 7)
- Release: August 17, 2009 – March 18, 2024

Hoarders is an American documentary reality television series that debuted on A&E on August 17, 2009. The show depicts the real-life struggles and treatment of people who suffer from compulsive hoarding disorder.

The series concluded its original run on February 4, 2013, after six seasons. Over a year after the program's original cancellation in 2013, Lifetime began airing a series of weekly "Update" episodes on June 2, 2014. Each "Update" episode presented an episode from earlier seasons, ending with a present-day visit to a featured hoarder by the therapist or organizer who worked with them. Interviews with the hoarder and their family reveal how their lives have progressed since their first appearance on the show. This led to the production of a seventh season, Hoarders: Family Secrets, which aired on Lifetime from May 28, 2015, to July 30, 2015.

The program returned to A&E for subsequent seasons beginning with season eight on January 3, 2016. "Update" episodes continue to run between seasons under the titles Hoarders: Where Are They Now?, Hoarders: Then & Now or Hoarders: Overload. The eleventh season premiered on July 20, 2020. A twelfth season premiered on March 22, 2021.

== Overview ==
=== Concept ===
Each 60-minute episode profiles one or two interventions. During most of the first season, the hoarder worked with either a psychiatrist/psychologist, a professional organizer, or an "extreme cleaning specialist", each of whom specialized in some aspect involving the treatment of obsessive compulsive disorders, anxiety disorders, and/or hoarding. A crew of professional cleaners (usually a local franchise of the series' major corporate sponsor) performed the actual cleanups. Two episodes in the first season featured a cleanup with both a psychologist and an organizer: Jill (episode "Jennifer and Ron/Jill") and Patty (episode "Patty/Bill"). From season 2 onward, all hoarders were given a psychologist and an organizer. The final episode of the first season, "Paul/Missy and Alex", featured professional organizer Geralin Thomas, CPO-CD, working with Missy, while a child psychologist, Dr. David Dia, worked with Missy's seven-year-old son Alex. Beginning in the second season, each hoarder had a psychologist-plus-organizer/cleaning specialist team assisting them. This specialist combination leads a group of cleaning professionals, family, friends, and relatives of the hoarder in conducting a two- to three-day decluttering session. In most instances, a crisis prompted the intervention, such as a threat of eviction or the removal of minor children from the home.

At the end of each episode, on-screen text indicates the short-term outcome of the cleanup effort, including the subjects' decisions on whether to seek further assistance from organizers and/or therapists. The show provides six months of aftercare funds to pay these professionals and, occasionally, to carry out vital repairs to the home.

Beginning with the season nine finale, episodes were expanded to two hours and focused on a single hoarder.

Each of the "Update" episodes revisits hoarders from previous episodes, showing clips from their original appearances followed by newer footage detailing the progress they have made.

=== Hoarding disorder ===
With the release of the DSM-5 in 2013, hoarding was classified as a separate disorder. During the show's original run, hoarding behaviors were considered symptoms of obsessive–compulsive disorder (OCD). Hoarding does show links to obsessive and compulsive behaviors; however, it also shows connections to major depressive disorder as well as attention deficit hyperactivity disorder (ADHD).

The role of documentary shows like Hoarders in this change of classification is unclear. However, some believe the rise in awareness caused by such shows was a significant contributing factor. When hoarding became a buzzword, it "commanded a significant amount of professional…attention".

== Episodes ==
Season	Episodes	Originally released	
Season	Episodes	First released	Last released
1	7	August 17, 2009	September 28, 2009
2	15	November 30, 2009	May 31, 2010
3	20	September 6, 2010	January 10, 2011
4	17	June 20, 2011	November 28, 2011
5	11	January 2, 2012	March 12, 2012
6	14	September 10, 2012	June 2, 2014
7	10	May 28, 2015	July 30, 2015
8	16	January 3, 2016	April 3, 2016
9	7	December 18, 2016	January 22, 2017
10	5	March 5, 2019	April 2, 2019
11	8	July 20, 2020	September 14, 2020
12	8	March 22, 2021	May 17, 2021
13	8	October 18, 2021	December 6, 2021
14	6	May 29, 2023	July 3, 2023
15	12	January 8, 2024	March 18, 2024
16	15	October 7, 2024	December 2, 2024

== Contributors ==
A number of board-licensed therapists, psychologists, and professional organizers have contributed to the show as on-air personalities. Recurring cast members are as follows:

=== Therapists ===
Professional	Credential(s)	Associated institution(s)
Dr. Suzanne Chabaud	Ph.D.	OCD Institute of Greater New Orleans
Dr. Melva Green	M.D., M.B.A., M.P.H.	
Dr. Scott Hannan	Ph.D.	The Institute of Living
Dr. Mark Pfeffer	M.S., L.M.F.T.	Panic/Anxiety Recovery Center of Chicago
Dr. Renae Reinardy	Psy.D.	Lakeside Center for Behavioral Change (Fargo, North Dakota)
Dr. David F. Tolin	Ph.D., A.B.P.P.	The Institute of Living
Dr. Michael Tompkins	Ph.D.	San Francisco Bay Area Center for Cognitive Therapy
Dr. Robin Zasio	Psy.D., L.C.S.W.	The Anxiety Treatment Center (Sacramento, California)

=== Organizers ===
Professional	Title
Dorothy Breininger	Certified professional organizer
Cory Chalmers	Extreme cleaning specialist
Matt Paxton	Extreme cleaning specialist
Dr. Darnita L. Payden	Life management specialist
Standolyn Robertson	Certified professional organizer
Erica DiMiele	Extreme cleaning specialist
Geralin Thomas	Certified professional organizer

== Reception ==
At the time of its premiere, Hoarders was the most-watched series premiere in A&E network history among adults aged 18–49 and tied for the most ever in the adults aged 25–54 demographic. The premiere was watched by 2.5 million viewers: 1.8 million adults aged 18–49.

In 2011, Hoarders won a Critics' Choice Award, in a tie with The Real Housewives of Beverly Hills, for best reality series.

== See also ==
- Hoarding: Buried Alive
