= Geralin Thomas =

American organizing consultant

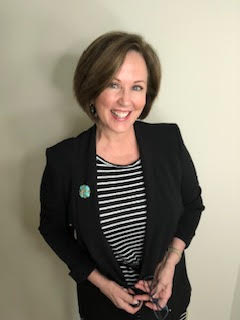
- Thomas in 2019
- Born: Geralin Henning; 1961 (age 64–65); Grosse Pointe, Michigan
- Education: University of North Carolina, Chapel Hill, (B.A.)
- Occupations: Organizer, Consultant
- Known for: Hoarders
- Spouse: William Thomas (m. 1988)
- Children: 2

Geralin Thomas is an American organizing consultant best known for her appearances on the television show Hoarders. She is the proprietor of the company Metropolitan Organizing, based in Cary, North Carolina.

== Early life and education ==
Thomas was born Geralin Henning in 1961 in Grosse Pointe, Michigan. She graduated from the University of North Carolina, Chapel Hill with a B.A. in art history.

== Career ==
Thomas worked in the travel industry, prior to founding Metropolitan Organizing, LLC, in 2002.

She appeared on various shows including:

- Time Makeover for the Fine Living Network,
- Hoarders on A & E, appearing in 22 episodes from 2009 to 2012,
- The Nate Berkus Show,
- The Joy Behar Show,
- Today,
- Time Makeover.

She has been interviewed for several radio shows on subjects related to hoarding and professional organizing including, Time Management Radio, Blog Talk Radio and Sunny 93 FM.

Thomas joined the National Association of Professional Organizers (NAPO) in August 2003, the organization's name was changed to National Association of Productivity and Organizing Professionals in 2017. She has been an instructor for NAPO since 2006. Thomas served as Vice President of the NAPO-NC chapter from 2004 to 2007 and as president from 2007 to 2008.

In 2009, Thomas became a Certified Professional Organizer in Chronic Disorganization and in 2013 was named the Best Chronic Disorganization Specialist at the 7th annual Organizing Awards presented by NAPO-Los Angeles.

Thomas maintains a blog where she interviews organizing experts and was a contributor to the Clutter Diet from 2008 until 2011. Her advice on hoarding disorder and professional organizing is regularly quoted in newspapers, magazines, publications and other print media including: Huffington Post, TV Guide and Experience Life Magazine. She has also written articles for various magazines.

== Books ==
- Thomas, Geralin. Decluttering Your Home: Tips, Techniques & Trade Secrets (September 2015). Firefly Books. ISBN 978-1770855854.
- Thomas, Geralin. From Hoarding to Hope: Understanding People Who Hoard and How to Help Them (April 2015). ISBN 9781506148359
- She is referenced in Dirty Secret: A Daughter Comes Clean About Her Mother's Compulsive Hoarding and The ICD Guide to Collaborating with Professional Organizers.

== Personal life ==
In 1988, she married attorney William Thomas. They have two sons.
