= List of Hoarders episodes =

Episodes of American documentary reality television series

Hoarders is an American documentary reality television program which aired on A&E, from 2009 to 2013, on Lifetime in 2015, and again on A&E beginning in 2016.

Each episode follows one or two participants, each of whom is a compulsive hoarder. Throughout the episode, an organizational expert (who may also be psychiatrist, psychologist or a professional organizer specializing in some aspect involving the treatment of obsessive/compulsive disorders, anxiety disorders, and/or hoarding) works with the subject to address the situation and provide guidance in order to change hoarding behaviors.

After the sixth season concluded on February 4, 2013, the program went on a hiatus before it was announced, on September 25, 2013, that the show had been cancelled. In June 2015, Lifetime organized a revival of the show, after a number of successful "update" episodes which began in June 2014. These episodes are not part of a specific season since producers trimmed existing episodes to allow for an update of the participants at the end of the episode which lasted about four minutes. Lifetime aired the seventh season, under the title Hoarders: Family Secrets which focused less on the gross-out factor of the hoard and more on the human story of the hoarders along with their therapeutic healing process. The show returned to A&E on January 3, 2016, for season eight which also returned to showcasing the gruesome details of each hoard, such as animal skeletons being unearthed. The "Update" episodes continue to run between seasons and are branded under the titles Hoarders: Where Are They Now?, Hoarders: Then & Now or Hoarders: Overload.

Almost all episodes are available to watch on A&E's website and Amazon Prime.

== Series overview ==
Season	Episodes	Originally released	
Season	Episodes	First released	Last released
1	7	August 17, 2009	September 28, 2009
2	15	November 30, 2009	May 31, 2010
3	20	September 6, 2010	January 10, 2011
4	17	June 20, 2011	November 28, 2011
5	11	January 2, 2012	March 12, 2012
6	14	September 10, 2012	June 2, 2014
7	10	May 28, 2015	July 30, 2015
8	16	January 3, 2016	April 3, 2016
9	7	December 18, 2016	January 22, 2017
10	5	March 5, 2019	April 2, 2019
11	8	July 20, 2020	September 14, 2020
12	8	March 22, 2021	May 17, 2021
13	8	October 18, 2021	December 6, 2021
14	6	May 29, 2023	July 3, 2023
15	12	January 8, 2024	March 18, 2024
16	15	October 7, 2024	December 2, 2024

== Episodes ==
=== Season 1 (2009) ===
No. overall	No. in series	Title	Original release date
1	1	"Jennifer & Ron/Jill"	August 17, 2009
Jennifer and Ron of Louisville, Kentucky, who both suffer from hoarding, risk losing their three children if they do not comply with numerous citations given to them by the city. Jill's food hoarding in Milwaukee, Wisconsin is so bad that she places herself at risk for food poisoning and is threatened with eviction.
2	2	"Linda/Steven"	August 24, 2009
Linda of Everett, Washington engages in compulsive shopping at thrift stores, which has depleted her family's finances and led to her husband, Jeff, filing for divorce. Her relationship with her four children has become strained, especially with her youngest daughter, Heather, who constantly fears Jeff getting angry over thrift store trips. Linda must clean out and sell the family home as part of a divorce settlement. Steven of Olympia, Washington is on the brink of eviction from his government-subsidized housing because his apartment is filled with garbage and human feces, and has one week to clean it up or he will lose his lease.
3	3	"Tara/Betty"	August 31, 2009
In Marysville, Ohio, Adult Protective Services removed Betty's sick, alcoholic husband, Charles, from his home following a fire caused by a combination of smoking and clutter. The couple's financial problems are complicated by their schizophrenic daughter, Trieste, who is also a hoarder. The family has been living in a motel for the past two months and can only afford one more week. Tara of Torrance, California is an obsessive collector. She faces eviction if she fails to clean up her home.
4	4	"Jake/Shirley"	September 7, 2009
Jake of Novato, California is unemployed and contemplating suicide. He hoards garbage in a two-bedroom apartment he shares with his alcoholic father, Terry. In New Mexico, an elderly, half-blind woman named Shirley's hoard has cluttered every room in her house. The house contains 76 living and dead cats, cat feces, and urine-soaked carpets and furniture, which has drawn the attention of Animal Control. Shirley may face potential criminal charges for animal abuse.
5	5	"Kerrylea/Lauren"	September 14, 2009
Kerrylea and Geoff of Seattle, Washington are facing imminent foreclosure on two houses because of a decision to buy a second house to solve Kerrylea's hoarding problem. Adding to their problems is the unexpected passing of Kerrylea's friend Carol two week prior. Lauren of Charlottesville, Virginia has been unemployed for over a year and has a strained relationship with her parents and boyfriend, Will, because of her hoard, which has taken over their condo.
6	6	"Patty/Bill"	September 21, 2009
In Kansas, Patty's compulsive shopping habits created a hoard that took over her house. Her two children were sent to live with their grandparents because of the living conditions, until the house can get cleaned up. In Beverly, Massachusetts, Bill's hoard of home renovation supplies and outdated materials is so bad that his wife, Lorelei, broke her arm tripping over a pile of things and falling down the stairs. Fed up with the clutter, she orders him to clean up or move out.
7	7	"Paul/Missy & Alex"	September 28, 2009
Paul of Mobile, Alabama has been issued multiple citations for criminal littering and is given three days to clean his property exterior, which has been turned into an illegal junkyard filled with broken vehicles, scrap metal, and old appliances, or face a three-month prison sentence. Missy, a single mother in Atlanta, Georgia, is concerned about her hoarding behavior because her seven-year-old son, Alex, is also exhibiting hoarding tendencies.

=== Season 2 (2009–10) ===
No. overall	No. in series	Title	Original release date
8	1	"Augustine"	November 30, 2009
In Gretna, Louisiana, Augustine's son, Jason, was removed from her home because of squalid living conditions 14 years prior. She now lives without water, gas, heat, or appliances. Over the past 20 years, Augustine has spent over $30,000 on city-mandated clean-ups, but is now in danger of permanently losing her home due to the uninhabitable conditions, and is also in poor health. It is up to Jason and his sister, Susan, to turn their mother's lifestyle around.
9	2	"Judi/Gail"	December 7, 2009
Time is running out for Judi of Riverdale Park, Maryland, whose cluttered home is condemned because of squalid conditions that have deteriorated its value. In Oklahoma, Gail has inherited a herd of goats and a massive hoard from her deceased parents. She risks facing a winter without heat and water.
10	3	"Chris/Dale"	December 14, 2009
After her son, Aiden, is stillborn, Chris of Phoenix, Arizona fills her home with possessions, jeopardizing her custody of her two daughters, Alex and Reilly. In Boston, Massachusetts, Dale is at risk of eviction from his city-subsidized apartment, which is filled with materials for art projects.
11	4	"Bob/Richard"	December 21, 2009
Bob and Betsy in Massachusetts are dealing with a serious bedbug problem and must clean out their entire house. In Columbus, Ohio, a retired veterinarian named Dick has dozens of costly collections that have affected his financial situation.
12	5	"Julie/Shannon"	December 28, 2009
In Scottsdale, Arizona, Julie lost custody of her son, Jason, to her ex-husband, Mark, four years earlier due to hoarding, and is on the brink of losing her two youngest children. In Spanaway, Washington, Child Protective Services arrives with police at Shannon and Tim's squalid home to remove their four children due to Shannon's compulsive hoarding. To get her children back, she has to clean her house and make the difficult decision of getting rid of most of her family's pets.
13	6	"Deborah/Jim"	January 4, 2010
In Tennessee, saleswoman Deborah risks losing her two sons, Lewis and Sam, as a result of her hoarding, and her husband, Ron, previously attempted suicide. Jim, a self-employed beekeeper in South Bend, Indiana, struggles with compulsive hoarding. Due to the unsanitary conditions, his daughter, Heather, threatens to call APS on him if he does not change his lifestyle. On top of that, there is a loaded gun missing in his house.
14	7	"Linda/Todd"	January 11, 2010
In Virginia, Linda's family has been torn apart by her hoarding. Despite her threats of suicide, her family gives her an ultimatum: if she does not clean up, her husband, Shelton, will divorce her, and she will lose contact with her children, especially with her police officer son, Jared. Todd of Phoenix, Arizona, who has been collecting hobby items since his childhood, is threatened with a breakup by his girlfriend, Robyn, if he does not clean his house.
15	8	"Janet/Christina"	January 18, 2010
In California, Janet's hoarding got out of control after her husband, Tom's, death from two years earlier. She shops compulsively and has filled her house with supplies to redecorate it. Christina, a former psychologist in San Antonio, Texas, has filled her house with clothes for her 13-year-old daughter, Hannah. Although most of the clothing has been unworn for years, Christina refuses to part with it. She has a lot of critical health conditions, and her hoarding is threatening to make them worse.
16	9	"Gail/Warren"	January 25, 2010
In Washington State, Gail's house needs major repairs, due to a fire that broke out over 20 years earlier, but it must first be cleaned. Warren, a self-employed heating and refrigeration specialist from Long Island, New York, takes work home with him. His house is filled with old refrigerators, tools, and supplies and is an unsafe environment for his toddler son, Joshua. His wife, Leanne, threatens to leave him while taking Joshua with her.
17	10	"Tra/Jill"	February 1, 2010
Tra is a firefighter in Houston, Texas with hoarding problems. His coworkers and superiors worry that the hoarding is affecting his job performance. He is at risk of losing his job if he does not clean his house out. In Springville, Iowa, Jill's two sons, Spencer and Tyler, suffer because of their untidy home. To make matters worse, Jill and Tyler have severe asthma, and the house's air quality has affected both of them.
18	11	"June/Doug"	February 8, 2010
In California, June faces the loss of her relationship with her 13-year-old daughter, Tori, if she doesn't get help for her hoarding. Doug, a single father in Milwaukee, Wisconsin, must clean up his home to keep his two adopted children, Nate and Kylie, especially the former, who was diagnosed with reactive attachment disorder.
19	12	"Dennis & Nadene/Erin & Malinda"	February 15, 2010
Dennis and Nadene of Cleveland, Ohio blame each other for their hoarding compulsions. Dennis has a lot of serious medical conditions, and the hoard is threatening to worsen his health. APS is on the family's case and are threatening to take action if the couple does not clean up. Erin and Malinda, two sisters in South Carolina, live as roommates and have filled their home with clothes, beauty products, and trash. With their elderly mother, Luanne's health on the line, they are threatened with eviction by the DSS.
20	13	"Claudie"	March 1, 2010
In Peoria, Illinois, Claudie's hoarding threatens to tear apart her large family. Her house has been so cluttered that she has been forced to live in a homeless shelter.
21	14	"Michelle/Kim"	May 31, 2010
In Oregon, Michelle's exotic bird hoard is so bad that her husband, Frank, broke his leg amongst the clutter and had to move away. In Tennessee, pharmaceutical sales representative Kim risks unemployment and her relationship with her new boyfriend, Matt, if she cannot get her hoarding under control.
22	15	"Betty, Jill, Jake, Bill & Paul Update"	May 31, 2010
This special follow-up episode covers the progress of Betty, Paul, Jill, Bill, and Jake, individuals from Season 1. Betty has still been hoarding since her first appearance on the show, but is now threatened with jail time if she does not get her home cleaned up within six months. Paul is still in a legal battle over the messiness of his property, but has not been sent to prison. Jill is still hoarding food in her house. Bill refused to continue cleaning after the show, but when his wife Lorelei survived a heart attack, he was motivated to continue, but his porch is still cluttered. Unfortunately, the family's house is now facing foreclosure. Jake is still struggling with OCD, but is now living in a much cleaner environment and is writing a book on his experience with hoarding.

=== Season 3 (2010–11) ===
No. overall	No. in series	Title	Original release date
23	1	"Adella/Teri"	September 6, 2010
In Edmond, Oklahoma, Adella's two daughters, Darcy and Beverly, help clean her home in an effort to keep it from being condemned. In Hawaii, Teri is threatened with divorce from her husband, Kerry, if she does not stop adding to the massive hoard in their home.
24	2	"Gordon & Gaye/Sir Patrick"	September 6, 2010
Gordon and Gaye of Washington State and their adult children, who are still living with their parents, have a hoard that was uncovered by the authorities after Gaye had an accident. They have three days to vacate their house if it is not cleaned. Sir Patrick in Florida collects goblets, dolls, fountains, and artwork and has to auction them off to avoid bankruptcy.
25	3	"Carolyn/Jo"	September 13, 2010
In Alberta, Canada, Carolyn's three daughters are so distraught about their mother's hoarding that her seven-year-old middle daughter, Danielle, has contemplated suicide. Jo's house in Irving, Texas is a collector's dream, but is destroying her marriage of 46 years, and is putting her husband, Ed's, health at risk.
26	4	"Robin/Ken"	September 13, 2010
Robin's hoard in Kansas is so bad that the city is threatening to demolish her childhood home and fine her $30,000. In Redlands, California, Ken is just two weeks away from a court date where he faces six months in jail if he doesn't clean up his home and yard.
27	5	"Laura/Penny"	September 20, 2010
In Tennessee, Laura, who is terminally ill with colon cancer, attempts to clean her home in a last chance attempt to unburden her family. In Michigan, Penny's hoard has been driven by the unexpected passing of her mother from 15 years earlier. It is so bad that her toddler son, Thomas, has been forced to sleep with her on the living room couch. Update: Five days before the episode aired, Laura died.
28	6	"Vula/Lisa"	September 27, 2010
Vula of Kokomo, Indiana is facing potential eviction for hoarding more than 30 sickly cats that have completely destroyed her home by using it as a litter box, which is also filled with piles of hoarded food and garbage. Lisa, an elementary school teacher in Utah, fears that her health and three-year relationship with her boyfriend, Eric, are in jeopardy due to her hoard.
29	7	"Kathleen/Margree"	October 4, 2010
After losing her husband of 23 years, Kathleen's Texas home has become so filthy that her two children, Melissa and Marco, have insisted they move out. Her lawyer sister, Paula, also attempts to uncover a secret Kathleen has been hiding from her children. Margree of Richmond, California is struggling to come to terms with the losses of her mother and two grandchildren and a strained marriage. Her husband, Wesley, is giving her one last shot to clean her house, or their marriage is over.
30	8	"Dawn/Linda"	October 11, 2010
After losing her closest cousin on 9/11, Dawn's hoarding in Las Vegas, Nevada spiraled out of control, filling much of the house and part of the yard. Linda's hoard in Pennsylvania is so bad that her diabetic husband, Steve, is unable to maneuver through the home by himself. The mess has caused a heated dispute between her and her daughter, Renee, who is threatening to involve APS.
31	9	"Tami/George"	October 18, 2010
Tami's hoard in Phoenix, Arizona is so bad that it is threatening to make her succumb to her lymphoma faster. George's hoard in Ohio is so bad that he has been ordered by the county to clean up his property or face jail time with very steep fines.
32	10	"Mary Lynn/Ingrid"	October 25, 2010
Mary Lynn's hoard in North Carolina is so bad that her teenage son, Jacob, developed anger issues and made up a story about her abusing him just to get into foster care. She must clean her home to avoid losing him to CPS. In Illinois, Ingrid's impulsive shopping is so bad that the clutter is a threat to her health and even caused a severe back injury to her son, Barry.
33	11	"Theresa/Karen"	November 1, 2010
In Citronelle, Alabama, Theresa's shopping addiction was sparked by the loss of her mother, sister, and grandson, depleting her family's life savings. Karen's drug addiction, suicidal attempts, and hoarding in Canada are fueled by 13 years of grief following the loss of her three-month-old daughter, Reilly.
34	12	"Al/Julie"	November 8, 2010
Alan's hoard in Hammond, Indiana is so bad that his three-year-old son, Frankie, was taken away by CPS after an inspection by the health department. In Englewood, Colorado, Julie's hoard is so bad that she and her husband, John, with their marriage on the line, were unaware that a homeless woman had been living in their cluttered basement. They are also dealing with electrical problems.
35	13	"Lloyd/Carol"	November 15, 2010
Suffering from dementia, Lloyd of Desert Hot Springs, California must clean up his property or face a $100,000 fine from the county and lose everything. In another part of the state, Carol was brutally injured on an amusement park ride, and has spent several years in court trying to reach a settlement. Now, her hoard of legal documents is so bad that her husband, Kelvin, threatens to divorce her if she refuses to part with her paper collection.
36	14	"Arline/Carolyn"	November 29, 2010
In Hawaii, Arline's hoard is so bad that her husband, Richard, is forced to sleep in his car in hot, humid weather, which is affecting his recovery from a recent surgery. In Idaho, Carolyn's hoard is largely obtained through theft, especially from her own family, and her daughter, Melissa, is threatening to turn her over to the police.
37	15	"Jim/Susan"	December 6, 2010
Jim's hoard in Upland, California has forced city officials to condemn his home and put his two grandchildren, Baylee and Charlie, at risk of removal by CPS. In Rochester, New York, Susan's doll hoard is so bad it has forced her husband, Bill, who has had a series of cancer surgeries, to sleep in the basement.
38	16	"Andrew/Shania"	December 13, 2010
The clutter on Andrew's property in New York has led to threats from the county to have him evicted. The situation is complicated by a long-running dispute with his brother, Alan, over the settlement of their late father's million-dollar estate, as well as the presence of a homeless man named Greg living in the backyard. To make matters worse, Alan is scheming to keep the estate for himself, prompting Andrew to file a restraining order against his brother. 14-year-old Shania of Illinois asks for help to control her parents, Belinda and Kevin's, hoarding, as well as her own hoarding. Belinda is threatening to leave her husband and daughter if the house doesn't get cleaned up.
39	17	"Andrew/Lydia"	December 20, 2010
19-year-old Andrew of Franklin, Massachusetts struggles with hoarding behavior, which he acquired from his mother, Jeanne, and fears he will continue to carry on those tendencies if he doesn't get help. In Paterson, New Jersey, Lydia is forced to clean out her home to accommodate her son, Michael, who is paralyzed from a car accident nine years earlier, or risk having him placed in a nursing home against his will.
40	18	"Mary/Mary Ann"	December 27, 2010
Mary, a near-bankrupt consignment shop owner in Broomall, Pennsylvania, risks losing both her home and business after burning through an inheritance from her late mother on items for her store. Mary Ann's hoard in Jericho, New York is so bad that she risks putting her 42-year marriage to her husband, Angel, in jeopardy as a result of being unable to part with her belongings.
41	19	"Hanna/Kathy & Gary"	January 3, 2011
In Vienna, Illinois, Hanna is depressed, was an abusive mother to her 16 children, and let her alcohol addiction tear apart her family. Now after years of hoarding to cope with the pain, her farm is so packed with dying and dead farm animals, animal feces, and other garbage that she must live in a single-wide trailer on her property. Kathy and Gary of Streetsboro, Ohio are threatened with eviction if they don't get their rental house cleaned up, which has been taken over by over 20 rabbits.
42	20	"Glen/Lisa"	January 10, 2011
Glen's rat hoard in Llano, California was triggered by his wife's unexpected passing and has forced him to live in his workshop. In Fullerton, California, Lisa is facing eviction by her father, Bill, if she does not clean up and part with many of her cats. The local fire department has also been on her case following a recent fire in the house.

=== Season 4 (2011) ===
No. overall	No. in series	Title	Original release date
43	1	"Phyllis/Janet"	June 20, 2011
In Griffin, Georgia, Phyllis' compulsive obsession with dolls has led her son, Ed, threaten to call APS to take his brother, Bobby, from her if she doesn't get a handle on her compulsion. Janet's hoard in Washington, Michigan is so bad that she has to crawl over mountains of garbage to get to a recliner where she eats and sleeps. She has had no running water or heat for two years as a result of her hoard. Her daughter, Beth, is threatening to involve APS.
44	2	"Billy Bob/Jean"	June 27, 2011
In Nebraska, Billy Bob's house is so filled with toys and knick-knacks that it is having an impact on his mobile disability. Jean, who lives in an upscale neighborhood in Beverly Hills, California, has a hoard so bad that she risks losing her eight-year-old granddaughter, Sabrina, to CPS if she doesn't clean up.
45	3	"Season #2 Follow-Up: Augustine, Judi, Dennis/Nadene, Bob & Deborah"	July 4, 2011
This special follow-up episode covers the progress of Augustine, Bob, Dennis and Nadene, Deborah, and Judi, individuals from Season 2. Augustine is struggling to change her habits, and a new mess has slowly been building up in her home since the clean-up. Bob and his family's house is now clutter-free and no longer experiencing bedbug problems. Nadene is still hoarding, and there has been a lack of communication between her and Dennis. Deborah has been depressed since her clean-up, and her family's house was foreclosed on, forcing them to move in with her brother in Florida. Judi was able to sell her house and has moved to an assisted living facility in Spokane, Washington, where she is now living in a much cleaner environment. Also, Judi's daughter, Ceci, and Augustine's son, Jason, became friends after watching each other's episodes.
46	4	"Roy/Loretta"	July 11, 2011
Roy's vehicle hoard in Boulder Creek, California is so large that he risks $20 million in fines from the county and the loss of his property if he doesn't remove at least 60 vehicles. The job proves to be very difficult with the interference of heavy rain and mud. In Lenox, Michigan, Loretta, who is expecting her second child, is in danger of losing both children if she doesn't clean up, but is also traumatized by a mugging at gunpoint from eight years earlier.
47	5	"Randy/Vicki"	July 18, 2011
Randy of Wildwood, New Jersey, who describes himself as "the ultimate hoarder", has a hoard of amusement park memorabilia that has become overwhelming to everyone who enters his 20,000-square-foot museum, which cannot be opened to the public, unless he opens a commercial arcade. Vicki's hoarding in San Antonio, Texas has grown out of control to the point that her daughter, Cherish, declares the apartment "doesn't exist anymore". Her husband, Paul, is threatening to leave with their 15-year-old son, Harley, if she doesn't change her ways.
48	6	"Ron/Carol"	July 25, 2011
In California, Ron, who suffers from depression and prostate cancer, hoards possessions reminiscent of his childhood, convinced that all of his belongings are valuable, even as his house is collapsing into ruin around him. His hoard is also a fire hazard, as he keeps an open flame on his stove to keep his home warm. Carol's house in Dayton, Ohio is overrun with garbage, forcing her to live in her truck on the street without adequate heating. She is given five days to clean up or face permanent eviction from her condemned property.
49	7	"Beverly/Megan"	August 1, 2011
Beverly's VHS tape hoard in Towanda, Kansas is so bad that it has caused a huge rift in her family. In Illinois, Megan, who had just given birth to her third child, is in jeopardy of losing both her home and her children if she doesn't get help cleaning her hoard.
50	8	"Becky/Clare"	August 8, 2011
In Collegeville, Pennsylvania, Becky has filled 16 self-storage units with her hoard and is now doing the same to her son, Ken's, house. She is behind on her storage rental payments and has until the end of the month to clean up and move out of his house. Becky must sell her belongings to pay off her debts and find a new home, but is under pressure by Ken, his fiancé, Michelle, and the storage facility's owner, Walter, who is threatening to take legal action against Becky. In West Palm Beach, Florida, Clare, who was forced by local authorities to undergo an involuntary mental examination, has been banned from living in her own house and has 10 days to clean it or face jail time. The home is filled with trash, and the swimming pool is moldy and green. Clare's son, Dean, and his girlfriend, Denise, live in a shed on the property with no bathroom, and will also be forced to leave if Clare doesn't get help.
51	9	"Stacey/Roi"	August 15, 2011
Stacey of Denham Springs, Louisiana has a hoard of nearly 50 cats and dogs that is so bad that her home is filled with feces and cockroaches, drawing the attention of Animal Control. Her 14-year-old daughter, Taylor, was forced to live with a relative as a result. In Dayton, Ohio, Roi's hoard is so bad that he risks a third trip to jail, and his utilities have been shut off due to a gas leak.
52	10	"Lisa/Bertha"	August 22, 2011
In Virginia, Lisa's home is overgrown with weeds and filled with garbage, rotting food, and mold, which has been driven by her now-deceased, abusive ex-husband. In Pennsylvania, Bertha faces jail time if she doesn't clean up her property. She picked up her behavior from her late father, who was a garbage man.
53	11	"Season #3 Follow-Up: Vula, Al, Jim, Arline & Glen"	August 29, 2011
This special follow-up episode covers the progress of Vula, Alan, Jim, Arline, and Glen, individuals from Season 3. Despite not putting a dent into cleaning her home at the time of her first appearance, Vula was able to get it back into compliance with the city and move back in, and her home is now fixed up and spotless. Alan's house is more cluttered than it was the year before, and his son, Frankie, has still not returned home. Jim was able to get his home back up to code, allowing him and his family to move back in. Arline has not been able to control her hoarding, but is now motivated to do so to keep her husband, Richard, from moving out. Glen has been doing much better since parting with his rat hoard, and his house is now rat-free, except for two rats that he officially adopted.
54	12	"Kevin/Mary"	October 24, 2011
Kevin McCrary, the son of late celebrity couple Jinx Falkenburg and Tex McCrary, is featured as his Upper East Side apartment is so densely hoarded that he has resorted to sleeping on a bench in front of his apartment building. He is now being threatened with eviction for his hoard. In New Brunswick, New Jersey, Mary's Victorian-style memorabilia hoard is so bad that she has to live with her daughter Adrienne, and granddaughter, Ariana, who are threatening to evict her, but she is unwilling to part with her collection.
55	13	"John/Vivian"	October 31, 2011
John of Cape May, New Jersey risks being charged with animal cruelty after he is shown to be living in a house with over 30 sick and dead cats, who have covered it with feces and urine, and the rooms are hoarded with garbage and his late mother's belongings. Vivian's hoard in California has forced her husband, Sylvester, to move to Detroit, Michigan, and he is threatening to stay there for good if she doesn't clean up. Adding to their problems is the abrupt passing of their oldest son, John, from two years earlier, as well as having to take care of their youngest son, Stanley, who has a lot of physical and mental disabilities.
56	14	"Judy/Jerry"	November 7, 2011
In Wisconsin, Judy, who hoarded herself out of her house, uses cancer surgery as an excuse to stay with her friend, Linda, who is fed up with her squatting and hoarding behavior. After nearly being killed by a fire in his Eugene, Oregon home five years earlier, Jerry risks having the city condemn his property if he doesn't clean up.
57	15	"Eileen/Judy"	November 14, 2011
In California, Eileen is a severe hoarder who risks getting divorced from her firefighter husband, Ron, and losing custody of her four younger sons if she fails to clean up her home. In Heber City, Utah, Judy has burned through most of a million-dollar inheritance from her late mother-in-law on her hoard and has checks that total up to $30,000 buried in the clutter. She and her husband, Nile, risk going broke if they can't get their financial situation on track.
58	16	"Wilma/Nora"	November 21, 2011
In Georgia, Wilma squats in her home, despite it being condemned as a result of her hoard. She must get it cleaned up or have it demolished. In Columbia, South Carolina, Nora, whose compulsive shopping has maxed out her equity line of credit, must address her behaviors in order to avoid losing her home and her relationship with her daughter, Jennifer.
59	17	"Mike/Bonnie"	November 28, 2011
Michelle "Mike" of Westminster, Maryland has a house that is so toxic that a virus she contracted in the home caused her kidneys to fail and almost killed her. Her doctor advised her not to return to the home until it was thoroughly cleaned. She has been living with her sister, Judy, since her near-death experience, which has put their relationship on the rocks. Bonnie, whose house in Palmdale, California is hoarded and in need of repair, fears losing her two teenage daughters, Paige and Blair, to CPS if she doesn't clean up her home. Note: The 2011 Virginia earthquake, a 5.8 earthquake that affected most of the Mid-Atlantic region, occurred during the clean-up of Mike's house and was shown in the episode. The clean-up team had to evacuate the house and put the clean-up on hold for a day while they checked for safety.

=== Season 5 (2012) ===
No. overall	No. in series	Title	Original release date
60	1	"Norman/Linda"	January 2, 2012
In Philadelphia, Pennsylvania, Norman is forced to clean his home following a recent visit by paramedics, in which they had to climb over hoarded items in an attempt to provide care to his girlfriend, Jeneveve, who subsequently died of a seizure from her alcohol addiction. Linda of Madisonville, Louisiana, who has been hoarding for decades, needs to clean her home in order to prepare for future rehabilitation following an upcoming surgery for her knees.
61	2	"Barbara/Richard"	January 9, 2012
In Merritt Island, Florida, Barbara, who has a family history of hoarding, continues to hoard following the deaths of her two sons from 17 years earlier. Her brother, Jerry, threatens to involve the authorities if she doesn't clean up. In Minnesota, Richard's house is condemned because of his hoard. He briefly stayed in a homeless shelter, but got evicted for spreading his hoard there. He is now faced with the decision of cleaning his house or becoming homeless.
62	3	"Mary/Annie"	January 16, 2012
In North East, Maryland, Mary's hoarded house is taken over by 15 cats, who have used it as a litter box. She must clean it or face severe consequences. In Missouri, Annie, who works as a professional housekeeper, lives in a cockroach-infested house filled with her hoarded possessions, where she must also take care of her husband, who suffers from Parkinson's disease, and her teenage son, Freddie, who is picking up her behavior. Her daughter, Sarah, is threatening to report her to CPS and APS.
63	4	"Carrie/James"	January 23, 2012
Carrie, a former victim of abuse, is living in a filthy seaside house in Washington State filled with garbage and human waste. For the last three years, she has had no heat or running water and is on the brink of losing her home. James, a retired police officer in Orland, California, is finding himself on the wrong side of the law, as his property exterior is cluttered with sporting equipment and other junk. He must clean it to avoid a hefty cleaning bill from the city.
64	5	"Joanne/Kristy"	January 30, 2012
In New York, Joanne's daughter, Robayn, has developed PTSD from dealing with her mother's hoard. In Washington State, Kristy lost her son, Dylan, to CPS due to her compulsive hoarding two years ago. He has been living with his oldest sister, Tawnya, since then, and cannot move back in with his mother until she can clean her house. Her hoarding was triggered by the trauma of a home invasion from 20 years ago.
65	6	"Barbara G./Fred & Mary"	February 6, 2012
In California, Barbara's hobby of collecting things from alleys and dumpsters and giving them away has spiraled out of control. Her hoarded home sits in an upscale neighborhood, where her neighbors look on in disgust. She risks a series of heavy fines if she doesn't clean her property. Fred and Mary live with their 14-year-old son, Kevin, in a Missouri house filled with clutter, cobwebs, and cockroaches, but the parents don't seem to notice, despite the fact Fred has a serious respiratory illness. Criminal charges were filed against Fred for child endangerment, and the family was forced to stay in a hotel until their home can get cleaned up, but they are running out of money and risking homelessness.
66	7	"Kathleen/Scott"	February 13, 2012
In New Jersey, Kathleen's hoarding began after her husband was hit by a train in 1987. Her hoarding not only fills up her own house, but also her daughter, Kristen's. Scott of Cedar, Michigan is in serious financial debt after purchasing over 500 properties with abandoned storage units and sheds. His hoarding addiction has also led to a heart condition and a strained relationship with his family.
67	8	"Dee/Jan"	February 20, 2012
Jan of Canyon, Texas has been living in filth for years, turning the home into a toxic environment for her and her cats. She has two weeks to clean her home or face permanent eviction by the city. In New Mexico, Dee won a $150,000 lawsuit following a botched surgery in 2004, which she used to fuel her hoarding obsession. She now risks losing contact with her daughter, Talia, who is threatening to report her to the authorities.
68	9	"Verna/JoAnne"	February 27, 2012
In Santa Cruz, California, Verna, a formerly convicted drug dealer, has turned to hoarding to replace her old addiction. Her home has become too cluttered and dangerous to live in and she is temporarily livining in a nursing home. JoAnne of Streetsboro, Ohio must clean her hoarded house before her son, Ed, calls APS on her.
69	10	"Anna/Claire & Vance"	March 5, 2012
In Florida, Anna refuses to get help for her hoarding, which has had a profound effect on her house's structure. She kept it a secret, but it was eventually uncovered by her family, who went as far as to break into her home to do so. Now she risks losing her property unless it is cleaned up. In Chicago, Illinois, Claire and Vance's house is an overcrowded and disorganized library, as they live under the weight of thousands of books, which has led to Vance being diagnosed with a heart condition. They must clean their house before the city obtains an inspection warrant.
70	11	"Constance/Jeri Jo"	March 12, 2012
Constance of Freestone County, Texas, who runs a fresh-egg business, has her home filled with garbage, unrefrigerated eggs, and loose chickens that cause problems. In Walnut, California, Jeri Jo, who is married to a man serving a life sentence in prison, hoards to cope with her loneliness. She risks a prison sentence, too, when her brother-in-law, Mike, who is a retired police officer, threatens to involve the authorities.

=== Season 6 (2012–14) ===
No. overall	No. in series	Title	Original release date
71	1	"Debra/Patty"	September 10, 2012
In Illinois, Debra compulsively shops and hoards clothing, but now her family is threatening to leave her if drastic measures are not taken. In North Dakota, Patty has hoarded so many cardboard boxes that she was forced to sleep along with heaps of trash piled on top of a decaying mattress before eventually moving in with her son, Sean, whose marriage is on the line because of her hoard.
72	2	"Doug/Ruth"	September 17, 2012
Doug of West Melbourne, Florida, who suffered severe brain trauma and memory loss in an off-roading accident 15 years earlier, hoards items he feels might trigger his memories. With no running water or electricity, he risks losing his house. Ruth of St. Louis, Missouri has been traumatized by the sudden deaths of her husband and two sons. She refuses to get rid of anything that belonged to them, and continually shops for more to drown her sorrows. Her two daughters are threatening to call APS if she doesn't get help.
73	3	"Charles/Alvin"	October 1, 2012
Alvin's hoarding in Kansas is so out of control that he has been forced to live in his bathroom. His frail mother once broke her hip in the hoard, leading to his sisters threatening to turn him over to the police, unless he cleans up. In Bisbee, Arizona, Charles' house and art studio are hoarded with books, art supplies, and nude paintings he has done. His obsession with women and painting is so extreme that it has destroyed his marriage to his wife, Ginger, and left his children worried that he may end up hurting himself.
74	4	"Shanna/Lynda"	October 8, 2012
Shanna of Bothell, Washington owns the worst hoard in the show's history – a house crammed floor to ceiling with garbage and bottles filled with human waste. She owes thousands of dollars in fines and risks being evicted by the city. In Montrose, Colorado, Lynda is hoarding stuff for the Armageddon. She believes she is going to be raptured, and wants to leave plenty of stuff behind for those who won't be going to heaven with her.
75	5	"Joni/Millie"	October 15, 2012
In Connecticut, Joni's hoarding resulted in her house being condemned, and she is now living with her boyfriend, Sal, who is threatening to kick her out. The hoard has also driven her two sons to do drugs, leading to them serving time in prison. Millie has agreed to more than one clean-up of her Michigan home, only to relapse and start hoarding again. Now her 17-year-old daughter, Chelsea, who was previously removed by CPS years ago, is threatening to terminate contact with her.
76	6	"Manuel/Carla"	October 22, 2012
In San Antonio, Texas, Manuel had been living in his hoarded house with his four grandchildren, until they were removed by CPS. To make matters worse, his son, John's, house is cluttered, too, and they cannot get the children back until both homes are cleaned up. In Oklahoma, Carla's hoarding was triggered by three failed marriages to men who cheated on her, putting her relationship with her new boyfriend, Rick, on the line. Her family is trying to get her to clean up so she can make a new start in life.
77	7	"Susan/Michael"	October 29, 2012
Susan of Tucson, Arizona is addicted to buying and selling cars and appliances, but she never manages to sell much. A while back, her mother, Mimi, was robbed at gunpoint in a home invasion while Susan was at her father's funeral. Susan also burned through a $425,000 inheritance from her father and she and her mother are in financial debt and risking homelessness. In Greenville, South Carolina, Michael's father was a World War II Nazi who raised his son with an iron fist, even tricking him into eating his own pet rabbit to "toughen him up." Now Michael is a hoarder and is threatened with eviction if he doesn't clean up.
78	8	"Terry/Adelle"	December 3, 2012
In Hanover, Illinois, Terry has nearly 50 sickly cats and a refrigerator filled with over 100 dead ones, along with other animals. Her son, Dave, thinks her problems stem from her father's death in front of her when she was 13. His ulitmatum for her is remove the cats or get the authorities involved. Decades of hoarding has left Adelle's New Hampshire house in such shambles that she has been using a bucket for a bathroom and doing laundry in a kiddie pool in her backyard. She risks losing her home if she doesn't get help for her hoard.
79	9	"Lee & BG/Chris"	December 10, 2012
In California, Lee and BG have filled their expensive Victorian home with hoards of stuff and are now even competing to see who can bring in the most stuff. In another part of the state, Chris has filled his house and eight storage units with worthless junk that he finds on the streets. His situation is so dire that he has no water and other basics just so he can continue to afford storage space for his garbage, which has put his financial situation in jeopardy.
80	10	"Jan/Bebe"	December 17, 2012
Jan denies that she is a hoarder, but her Texas home is so cluttered and filled with cats and dogs it is too dangerous for her to live in. A recent inspection by the fire department has led to the authorities threatening to condemn her house. In Georgia, Bebe grew up wealthy with servants, and her husband gave her everything she desired. But when her husband was murdered in the hallway of their home in 1982, her privileged life unraveled, and now her hoarding is so bad that she takes her anger out on her daughters, whose ultimatum for her is clean up or move to a nursing home.
81	11	"Jeff/Merlene"	January 21, 2013
Merlene of Topanga, California is a former international supermodel and the ex-wife of David Lear, the son of Learjet founder Bill Lear. Her storybook life fell apart when she divorced David, and now her home is crammed to the ceiling with items from shopping and dumpster diving. In Chattanooga, Tennessee, Jeff is a trumpet player for his local radio station, but is also hoarding two homes to cope with the loss of his 23-year shoe repair business. His new friend, Camilla, is threatening to report him to the city if he doesn't clean them out.
82	12	"Diana/Dolores"	January 28, 2013
In Snyder, Oklahoma, Diana, who is traumatized by memories of her abusive father and husband, has developed hoarding so extreme that her daughter, Reba, was forced to sleep in a recliner. Now her home could be condemned if she doesn't clean up. In New York, Dolores has an antique hoard that caught the attention of her neighbors when a smoke alarm went off when she wasn't home, leading to the fire department being called. Now her home is at risk of being condemned due to its dangerous conditions.
83	13	"Fuzzie & Fredd/Nancy"	February 4, 2013
Well into their 40s, Fuzzie and Fredd are living like teenagers and have stuffed their Ohio home and an 8,000-square-foot warehouse with records, comic books, musical instruments, and mannequins. Fuzzie's father, Chuck, works 10-hour days to support them, but now he is desperate to retire and on the verge of cutting them off. In Seattle, Washington, Nancy's freezing, sludge-filled home is filled with garbage and feces. Her niece, Michelle, now fears that the hoard may have an impact on her aunt's health. Nancy has also been suffering from depression after failing to adopt a child.
84	14	"Where Are They Now?"	June 2, 2014
This special follow-up episode covers the progress of five of the most memorable hoarders years after they faced a crisis due to their hoard. Constance from Season 5 has adapted to living in her new trailer, but is still struggling to change her hoarding behavior. Shannon from Season 2 got her children back from CPS two months after her clean-up, but her husband, Tim, filed for divorce in 2011. Nonetheless, having proved that she is now capable of taking care of the children, Shannon was granted full custody and moved with them to a ranch in Ritzville, Washington, where they are now living in a much cleaner environment, along with 37 animals, all of whom they genuinely care for. Kevin from Season 4 was recently evicted from his apartment after losing a two-year legal battle with his landlord over his hoard, and is now living in a van. He is also still hoarding and has moved all his belongings to about 10 storage units. Shortly after the show checked in on Augustine from Season 2 for the first time, she narrowly survived kidney failure and is now living in a nearby nursing home, which has helped put her hoarding behind her and improve her relationship with her daughter, Susan. Ruth from Season 6 is no longer hoarding to cope with the losses of her husband and sons, and has been spending quality time with her daughters and grandchildren.

=== Season 7: Family Secrets (2015) ===
No. overall	No. in series	Title	Original release date
85	1	"Hoarders: Live"	May 28, 2015
This special features live segments culminating in a live intervention. Richard of Cotuit, Massachusetts has been affected by the unexpected death of his infant daughter, Cheryl, from years ago, which led to him and his wife, Judy, getting divorced three years later. After the rest of their children grew up and moved out, Richard's hoarding spiraled out of control and is now at risk of losing his home to the city. This episode also features an update on Jim and his family from Season 3. Despite getting his home back up to code a year after his first appearance on the show, a new hoard had slowly built up on Jim's property over the next five years, and now he is threatened with a two-month prison sentence and the permanent loss of his home.
86	2	"Joyce/Kimberly"	June 4, 2015
In Huntsburg, Ohio, Joyce's 31-year marriage to her husband, Wallace, is on the line because of her hoard. Kimberly of Toledo, Ohio has been scarred by a traumatic experience, which she has kept to herself for years, and her hoard has had multiple negative impacts on her daughter, Shelby's, health.
87	3	"Michelle/Yama"	June 11, 2015
In Ohio, Michelle's hoarding spiraled out of control following the death of her brother, who was murdered in jail while serving a sentence for DUI. She now fears losing her two sons to CPS, following a dispute with a neighbor that led to them finding out about the clutter inside the house. Yama of Dayton, Ohio is a compulsive shopper, which is affecting her financial situation. She picked up her late mother's hoarding behavior and the two kept the shopping a secret, until Yama's cousins saw the inside of her house at the time of her mother's death.
88	4	"Ruthann"	June 18, 2015
Ruthann of Porterville, California bought her family's historic house from her cousin, Patti, with the promise that she would turn it into a bed and breakfast. Instead, she has filled it with pets and antiques, and blames her actions on her daughter, Tamara, who ran away with her boyfriend when she was 15.
89	5	"Cynthia/Ricky"	June 25, 2015
In Westland, Michigan, Ricky lives in a house packed with books, paper, and other flammables that are one spark away from an inferno that could be caused by his only heat, which is a portable heating lamp. Cynthia has a debilitating case of Hashimoto's thyroiditis, and is on the brink of making it deadly as she continues to fill her Texas home, which has been infested with mice.
90	6	"David/Nora"	July 2, 2015
Nora's Kentucky home is filled to the brim with massive piles of clothes and antiques, and her health is now on the line. She has been hoarding to deal with the passing of her son, Kevin, from a brain tumor over 30 years ago and has kept her hoard a secret from her sisters for over a decade. David's massive hoard in Michigan has been deemed a nuisance by the city. Now he risks losing his home and his relationship with his girlfriend, Diana, if he doesn't clean up.
91	7	"Brian/Coral"	July 9, 2015
In Winter Haven, Florida, Coral must choose between keeping her hoard or rekindling her relationship with her ex-fiancé, Vernon, whom she has not seen in over 30 years. In Dublin, Ohio, Brian, who is the president of a condo homeowner association and sets the rules of upkeep for tenants, has a hoard in his own condo that would cause any of his tenants to be evicted.
92	8	"Michelle/Mary"	July 16, 2015
In Warren, Michigan, Michelle's doll hoard is negatively impacting her recovering alcoholic husband, Maurice's, sobriety and her elderly mother, Genny's health. In Fresno, California, Mary's neighbors threaten to report her house, claiming it is ground zero for the area's rat population due to her massive hoard.
93	9	"Doris/T'resa"	July 23, 2015
T'resa of Annabella, Utah is an asthmatic chain-smoker who lives in danger of accidentally setting her hoard and home ablaze. Doris of Long Beach, California is forced to sleep on her patio due to her massive hoard that occupies every room in her house from floor to ceiling.
94	10	"Laura"	July 30, 2015
Laura's hoarding has taken over so much of her Lakeside, California home that her longtime live-in boyfriend, John, has resorted to sleeping in the garage and her 14-year-old daughter, Angelina, is forced to share a bed with her. If Laura doesn't clean up, John is threatening to leave and file for full custody of Angelina.

=== Season 8 (2016) ===
No. overall	No. in series	Title	Original release date
95	1	"Judy"	January 3, 2016
Judy of Vancouver, Washington is a germaphobe who spends her days engaged in sanitization rituals, yet she lives in a severe and extremely filthy hoard overridden with mice whom she considers friends. Her hypocritical lifestyle has sparked a strained relationship with her daughter, Sherri, and become so dangerous to her health that the city has ordered her to clean her home or lose it.
96	2	"Roxann/Barbara"	January 3, 2016
Roxann, a 32-year old single mother and former model living in Philadelphia, Pennsylvania, has been hoarding to cope with her mother's passing from two months earlier. She now fears losing her baby son, Joaquin, to CPS. Barbara's extreme hoarding in Beaver Falls, Pennsylvania was triggered over 30 years earlier when her then-five-year-old son, Brandon, accidentally burned the family's old home to the ground. She was recently forced to move out of her home following the recent passing of her husband, and now the city is ready to condemn her home and do a forced clean-up if she doesn't take care of the problem.
97	3	"Jackie/Richard"	January 10, 2016
In San Leandro, California, Jackie has filled her 4,000-square-foot home with thousands of teddy bears, which has put her in serious financial debt. Richard previously agreed to his family's pleas for an emergency clean-up of his Cotuit, Massachusetts home during Hoarders Live from the previous season. Now they will see if he keeps his promise.
98	4	"Ruby/Mary"	January 10, 2016
Ruby's Long Beach, California home is so hoarded that she lives in her car, and her grandson, Christopher, had been running the streets until he was sentenced to 25-years-to-life in prison for shooting someone in the leg five years ago. She now fears that her 17-year-old great-grandson, Jeremy, will fall into the same trap, and her daughters are threatening to call APS. Mary's historic home in Napa, California is filled with so much stuff her two young children, Michael and Maria, are in danger of being removed from the home by CPS.
99	5	"Ben & Robin/Kevin"	January 24, 2016
In West Virginia, Ben and Robin have serious medical conditions, but their hoarding is so severe that EMTs can no longer access their home for emergencies. Kevin of Albuquerque, New Mexico has been living in a hotel since being diagnosed with a heart condition caused by his hoard. He must reveal a disturbing secret and clean up his home with family if he wants to move back in.
100	6	"Dorothy & David/Doris"	January 24, 2016
Dorothy and David of Prineville, Oregon fell in love with each other over their mutual love of hoarding. Their home is so cluttered it has become physically unsafe for Dorothy and doctors have said one more fall in the hoard could paralyze her. In Philadelphia, Pennsylvania, Doris' house is so packed with clothes and shoes that she has been hoarded out of her house.
101	7	"Dick/Karen"	January 31, 2016
In Pomona, California, Dick has hoarded out his girlfriend, Sandy's, home to the point that the two of them can no longer live in it. They kept it a secret from Sandy's family until Dick was diagnosed with a heart condition. They are now facing financial ruin if they can't shed their current apartment rental and get back into Sandy's old home. Karen of Albuquerque, New Mexico started hoarding after the suicide of her oldest son, Stephen, which was caused by his parents getting divorced. Her daughter, Kathryn, and two-year-old grandson, Ryland, have been living in her house for the past year, and her neighbor has been making calls to CPS due to the state of the property.
102	8	"Peggy/Ed & Connie"	January 31, 2016
Peggy's hoard of garbage and dead animal carcasses in Illinois has led the city to deem her house uninhabitable. If she does not clean up, city officials will not allow her to return to her condemned home. In Woods Cross, Utah, Ed and Connie met over their mutual love of Halloween. However, their love of the holiday ballooned into a hoarding problem. With conditions in their home becoming intolerable, their 17-year-old son, Hunter, has issued an ultimatum: clean up or he will take himself and his autistic 14-year-old brother, Fisher, out of the home.
103	9	"Ellen/Gloria"	February 14, 2016
In Queens, New York, the tragic loss of Ellen's husband in the line of duty from decades ago triggered her hoarding through kleptomania, which was unknown to her sons. Her house has become so unsafe with her stolen items, her insurance company is threatening to revoke coverage. In Liberty, Texas, Gloria has been through four abusive marriages and her family is on the verge of calling the authorities due to her out-of-control hoarding of stuff and pets.
104	10	"Kathy/Mira"	February 21, 2016
In Great Falls, Montana, Kathy has hoarded out her triplex and dance studio and is facing financial ruin if she can't clean up and rent out her spaces. Her 13 children, including Sarah, who developed dissociative identity disorder to cope with the hoard, will try to get her to face her demons. In Chesapeake, Virginia, Mira's hoard has become so bad that Code Enforcement is on the verge of condemning her home and possibly pursuing criminal charges. Her family will have to resolve their "step vs. blood" dynamics to help her through the process.
105	11	"Where Are They Now?"	February 28, 2016
This special follow-up episode covers the progress of five of the most memorable hoarders years after they faced a crisis due to their hoard. Jill from the show's pilot episode had still been hoarding food at the time of her first update. She has since moved to a new house across town and has kept it tidy, but still has a packed refrigerator with some expired food, although she insists that she does a better job of checking the food. Verna from Season 5 has been struggling to curb her hoarding, but her home is no longer a health hazard. Claire and Vance from Season 5 are still hoarding books, but have remained committed to keeping certain areas of their home clear, although it is still a safety issue. Dale from Season 2 had been struggling to get rid of some of his belongings since his first appearance, but when his mother died two years ago, it re-triggered his hoard, and now he is at risk of eviction from his apartment again. Alan from Season 3 had been trying to get his home back up to code over the next five years to get his son, Frankie, back from CPS. Alan's efforts have proved successful, and now eight-year-old Frankie is officially reunited with his father and living a happy life in clutter-free conditions. Note: Paul Krizman, the county inspector who was assigned to Alan's case, died of cancer shortly after his last visit to Alan on the show. The episode was dedicated to his memory.
106	12	"Sybil/Ron"	March 6, 2016
In Gresham, Oregon, Sybil's hoard is so intense that mice have started to live in her bathtub and refrigerator. Her home is so packed with items and rodents that she has been forced to sleep in her backyard cat aviary. Ron has hoarded out his camera repair shop in Miami, Florida to the point where he has lost many of his customers. If he doesn't clean up, he could end up losing his business and his relationship with his wife, Trish.
107	13	"Sandy/Len"	March 13, 2016
Sandy's sister, Nona, owns the family home in Lisbon, Maine, where Sandy has lived her entire life. Nona has not been inside the home in 10 years, but when Code Enforcement notified her, she orders Sandy to clean up or get evicted. Len lives in an Akron, Ohio home stuffed with garbage bags where he keeps all his belongings. He has been hoarding to cope with the losses of his parents and aunt. A heart attack caused him to lose his job, and if he doesn't clean up, his loved ones fear his hoard will kill him.
108	14	"Celia/Nathan"	March 20, 2016
Celia has been affected by an abusive marriage and is in danger of facing jail time and losing her Southern California home, which is full of shoplifted items and dogs, if she doesn't get her compulsion under control. In Dawsonville, Georgia, Nathan came out as gay when he was 15. The lack of acceptance from his community led him to hoard items as a way to deal with his pain. His hoarding has escalated to the point where he is facing eviction from his home.
109	15	"Maggie/Ann"	March 27, 2016
Maggie's Phoenix, Arizona home is so packed with items from her shopping addiction that her granddaughter, Cici, was forced to sleep on top of piles and shower outside with a garden hose. Things have gotten so bad, that Maggie's daughter, Peaches, pulled her and Cici out of the house, but Maggie continued to secretly hoard the place. If things are not cleaned up, they will not be allowed to return. Former spa owner Ann of South Carolina is about to lose her longtime boyfriend, Michael, over her hoard. After a decade of failed promises to clean up her house, Michael has issued an ultimatum: she must clean up or he will leave her.
110	16	"Sandi/Vivian"	April 3, 2016
Sandi of Port Angeles, Washington is known as the town's Mrs. Claus over the holidays. However, she has taken her alter ego to the extreme with her gift hoarding compulsion. Things have gotten so out of control with her Mrs. Claus persona that Sandi is on the verge of going bankrupt and losing her home. In New Mexico, Vivian's daughter, Heather, and grandson, Maddox, live with her, but Heather is on the verge of losing her son to CPS because of her mother's hoarded home.

=== Season 9 (2016–17) ===
No. overall	No. in series	Title	Original release date
111	1	"Lonnie/Linda"	December 18, 2016
Lonnie Hammargren is a famed neurosurgeon and former Lieutenant Governor of Nevada, who now lives in Las Vegas. He is also a notorious hoarder, spending an estimated $10 million on his collections, but is now facing potential bankruptcy and the loss of all assets if he can't auction off some of his hoard to pay off debts. Linda of Sweet Home, Oregon got a job as a storage facility manager to fuel her obsession with collecting. However, she has accrued so many abandoned storage units, she can barely live in her house. Her loved ones are on the verge of calling authorities to have her forcibly removed from the home if she doesn't clean up.
112	2	"Stanks/Ann"	December 18, 2016
Rodger and Gerri Stank of Milwaukee, Wisconsin have hoarded themselves out of their home and are facing the loss of their property if they cannot get it up to code. Ann of Alpharetta, Georgia has a diabetic husband, Scott, who is at risk for life-threatening injuries trying to survive in her enormous collection of Christmas decor. If Ann doesn't reduce her hoard, Scott will leave her for his own physical safety.
113	3	"Paul/Belinda"	January 1, 2017
Paul, an elderly man in Barnesville, Georgia, risks losing his home of 40 years and his dogs due to his hoarding. To make matters worse, his live-in girlfriend is also a hoarder. Belinda has kept her floor-to-ceiling hoard a secret from property managers at her Hodgkins, Illinois mobile home park. Now she's been given an ultimatum: clean up or face eviction.
114	4	"Leza/Linda"	January 1, 2017
In Tucson, Arizona, Leza's house is so packed, the city has deemed it uninhabitable. If she doesn't clean up in three days, she could end up homeless. In Canton, Ohio, Linda's husband, Dave, has just undergone a successful heart transplant, but, due to Linda's hoarding and the unsanitary conditions of the home, Dave's medical team will not allow him to move back in with her.
115	5	"Linda/Kerry"	January 8, 2017
Linda has hoarded out a 180-acre Vermont farm in preparation for the end of times. She is adamant that civilization will collapse within the next few months and that her hoard and property will be a refuge for those who survive. However, in current times, she is facing the potential loss of her property to city authorities if she can't clean up. Kerry of Franklin, Indiana started hoarding after he lost his job as a military medic due to cutbacks. His home is now so full of plants and junk, he risks losing contact with his family.
116	6	"Shannon/Ray"	January 15, 2017
Shannon of Ogden, Utah is convinced that her hoarding is caused by demons possessing her home. She is so frightened by the entities and the severe clutter that she and her three children are living in a shelter. Ray's historic Victorian home in San Francisco, California almost burned down the block when his hoard caught on fire due to electrical failure in his kitchen. He is now under pressure from nearly every city agency to clean up his hoard or potentially lose his house. Note: Ray's brother, Tony, who was living with him and appeared at the beginning of the episode, died just before their clean-up started.
117	7	"Sandra"	January 22, 2017
Former interior designer Sandra has hoarded out every square inch of Hillside, the historic Greensboro, North Carolina mansion she lost to foreclosure. However, she refuses to leave the property in spite of the fact the bank has sold it to new owners, who are now facing a crisis of conscience trying to figure out how to compassionately evict Sandra from the property and dispose of her hoard. The clean-up becomes extremely difficult when the team, the owners, and her three brothers have to deal with her stubbornness.

=== Season 10 (2019) ===
No. overall	No. in series	Title	Original release date
118	1	"Andy & Becky"	March 5, 2019
Andy and Becky of Marysville, Washington feel it is their constitutional right to live the way they want, even if it is among 250 tons of hoard. For years, they have been in a legal battle with the city, and their case is now at a point where they could go to prison and lose their home.
119	2	"Dale"	March 12, 2019
Over the past 30 years, Dale of Fairbanks, Alaska has filled his property with everything from decking from the Yukon River Bridge to more than 100 vehicles. Hoarded out of his home and with a winter with temperatures dipping into the negative 60s approaching, Dale must clean up or face a cold death.
120	3	"Linda"	March 19, 2019
Linda of Greensburg, Indiana has a hoard that is so bad it triggered her daughter, Kristen, to become a drug addict, eventually leading her to serve two-and-a-half years in prison, leaving Linda to take care of her two grandchildren, Dallas and Shawntae. After Kristen was released, Linda kept the inside of the house a secret from her family until a recent medical emergency exposed her mess and forced her to move to a nursing home. She must clean her house if she wants to move back in.
121	4	"Patricia"	March 26, 2019
Patricia makes extra money selling things that other people have discarded but is fined thousands of dollars a week because her three Florida homes are overflowing with her inventory, which has put her relationship with her boyfriend, Bill, on the line.
122	5	"Three Amigos"	April 2, 2019
In Tewksbury, Massachusetts, Donald and brothers, Peter and Raymond, are close friends who do everything together, including hoarding. Each of them is now facing their own personal crisis due to their hoarding. Donald and Peter are in denial about their hoards but have been receiving repeated orders from the town over the years to clean their properties. Peter's wife, Sandra, has a severe case of emphysema, and his hoard has put her health at risk. Raymond has a problem with hoarding food, as he can't stand letting it go to waste, and it has put his marriage to his wife, Sam, on the rocks. Note: Just before the third day of the clean-up began, Sandra suffered a fall that required her to be admitted to the hospital, where she died nearly two weeks later.

=== Season 11 (2020) ===
No. overall	No. in series	Title	Original release date
123	1	"Carol"	July 20, 2020
Over the past 20 years, Carol of Ferguson, Missouri has hoarded her husband, Dave's, historic mansion, but now with the property on the brink of being condemned, Dave's family unites to try to save the house and confront Carol about her behavior. Update: In September 2019, Dave died.
124	2	"Sherry"	July 27, 2020
Sherry's justification for her massive hoard in Wheeling, West Virginia is that it protects her from robbers, but instead it has prevented her two children, Matt and Lauren, from getting along with each other and their mother.
125	3	"Althia"	August 3, 2020
Althia of Heath, Ohio is at risk of heavy fines for multiple vehicles, building materials, and a 60-foot semi-trailer on her residential property. Her 5,000-square-foot unfinished dream home is filled with unsold inventory from her late husband's now-defunct business.
126	4	"Becky"	August 10, 2020
For over 20 years, Becky of Huron, South Dakota has hoarded her home and motel, which was triggered by an abusive marriage. She must clean both properties and begin relieving her mounting debts to get her life back on track.
127	5	"Dennis"	August 17, 2020
As a retired architect, Dennis of Citrus Heights, California sees the value in repurposing and using materials for all types of projects. This has led him to collect a massive amount of clutter over the years. Being the primary caregiver for his frail wife, Judith, who has Parkinson's disease, Dennis has no more time to spend completing projects he once desired to accomplish, but now that Code Enforcement is concerned about the safety of his property, he must clean it or risk losing everything.
128	6	"Flora"	August 24, 2020
Flora's daughter, Louvnia, and two grandchildren, Mia and Nicolas, recently moved into her Daphne, Alabama home, but due to her massive hoard, the entire family must eat, sleep and live in a single room. Now Flora must clean up or face the removal of her grandchildren by CPS.
129	7	"Cindy"	August 31, 2020
To cope with several losses in her family, Cindy of Byhalia, Mississippi has hoarded her son, Cody's, property, along with her friend's and a storefront that she originally planned to turn into an antique shop. Now she must clean all three properties or risk hefty fines from the county.
130	8	"John"	September 14, 2020
In Yucca Valley, California, John's extreme hoard, rat infestation, and mounting citations from the city has become too much for him to handle. He must now clean up or face losing his home and his relationship with his longtime girlfriend, Janet.

=== Season 12 (2021) ===
No. overall	No. in series	Title	Original release date
131	1	"Eric"	March 22, 2021
Eric of Rydal, Georgia risks losing his house due to serious financial debt caused by his hoarding, which was triggered by his permanent case of scoliosis. He must not only seek help to clean his home, but also to cope the loss of his wife, Szilvie, from over a year ago.
132	2	"Forrest"	March 29, 2021
An appreciation for the finer things in life led to Forrest of Fredericksburg, Virginia to acquire an excess of unique items that have overtaken his home, inside and out. As a result, he is now in a financial crisis and is facing fines from the representatives of his homewner association, who are now threatening him with eviction.
133	3	"Dolores"	April 5, 2021
Dolores of Hanover, New Jersey became a compulsive shopper following a battle with cancer and her mother's death 20 years earlier. Now every room of her home is filled to the brim, and her husband, Arthur, has issued an ultimatum: clean up or their 50-year marriage is over.
134	4	"Cobra"	April 13, 2021
Fred "Cobra" Santiago is a retired professional wrestling manager living in Buffalo Township, Pennsylvania. Cobra is about to become a grandfather, but first he must clean up his house and 37-acre property before he can meet his first grandchild.
135	5	"Meryl"	April 19, 2021
Code Enforcement officials in Worcester, Massachusetts are threatening Meryl with fines and eviction for her cluttered living condition. She must clean her home to avoid losing everything.
136	6	"Tim"	April 26, 2021
Tim of Citrus Heights, California sees the value in repurposing and using materials for all types of projects, leading him to collect a massive amount of clutter over the years. He must clean his two properties or risk having both homes demolished.
137	7	"Margie"	May 10, 2021
Margie and her husband, Bethel, live on a two-acre ranch in North Collinsville, Oklahoma, filled with an estimated 500 tons of clutter contaminated with rodent waste. Suffering from back pain that will require surgery, Margie must clean her home to make it safe for her recovery.
138	8	"Debbie"	May 17, 2021
Debbie of McKeesport, Pennsylvania suffered the sudden loss of her parents and sister, and has turned to hoarding and compulsive shopping to cope with her grief. She must clean her home with help from her daughter, Bethany, and grandson, Josh.

=== Season 13 (2021) ===
No. overall	No. in series	Title	Original release date
139	1	"Terri"	October 18, 2021
Terri of Florissant, Missouri works 24-hour shifts as an in-home caregiver and rarely sets foot inside her packed home. She and her longtime boyfriend, Kraig, have always wanted to get married, but the hoarding has now put their relationship on the line. To make matters worse, she has gone as far to hoard her current patient, Roy's, home for extra storage space, putting his health at risk.
140	2	"Tiffany"	October 25, 2021
Tiffany of New Berlin, Wisconsin never lived an independent life growing up as a person with dwarfism. Her parents were hoarders, and she continued to add to their hoard after their deaths. Now that the family home is unliveable, she lives with her sister, Becky.
141	3	"Paul"	November 1, 2021
Paul lost his partner, Skip, six years ago and turned to collecting items to use in his design business, creating a massive hoard. Now his Jacksonville, Florida home is filled with an endless array of lamps, furniture, and knick-knacks.
142	4	"Carl"	November 8, 2021
In Tampa, Florida, Carl, his brother, and his parents used to have fun looking in trash cans to see what useful things they could find. Since his parents and brother died decades ago, he has turned his entire property into a junkyard. Facing over $1 million in fines from the city and having previously served jail time for criminal littering, Carl now risks homelessness and another trip to prison, this time for contempt of court.
143	5	"Carmen"	November 15, 2021
Carmen of Richmond, Texas has faced several misfortunes that triggered her compulsive hoarding and online shopping. After losing her husband, Mike, to cancer, she suffered a neck injury that ended her career as a data management specialist. Her daughter, Melissa, is worried about her mother as she has shut out communications with much of the family.
144	6	"Kate"	November 22, 2021
Kate of Weaverville, North Carolina collected items from her clients when she worked as a realtor that she would often use to stage homes that she was selling. She grew up with a strict father and a shy mother, and the recent loss of her husband, Herb, left her with overwhelming grief to deal with. Kate's home is now a complete mess, and the city is issuing her daily $50 fines under Code Enforcement laws.
145	7	"Peggy"	November 29, 2021
Peggy's divorce in 1981 when her ex-husband received full custody of their daughter, Alissa, has left her feeling lonely. Finding a job as a live-in caregiver required her to move to Whidbey Island, Washington and start over. Thrift store shopping allowed Peggy to socialize after becoming alone again when her client died, but it also triggered her hoarding disorder. Because Peggy's client had no family when she died, Peggy ended up inheriting her house and belongings, making the hoard worse.
146	8	"Martha"	December 6, 2021
Martha of San Antonio, Texas has been dealing with deception from a married man, health problems, and caring for her parents' last moments in life. Not wanting to ask friends and family for help strains relations and allows the clutter in her place to spiral out of control.

=== Season 14 (2023) ===
No. overall	No. in series	Title	Original release date
147	1	"Lia"	May 29, 2023
In Hayward, California, Lia became intrigued by her mother's many collectibles as a child and started going to antique stores and estate sales with her. Her hoarding spiraled out of control when her three sons grew up and moved out. Things got worse a year ago when Lia suffered a stroke that made her lose half her hearing in one ear and part of her ability to walk. Her sons now fear that the hoard could kill her and her husband, Ken.
148	2	"Andy"	June 5, 2023
Andy of San Diego, California has worked odd jobs his entire adult life, and he considers himself an entrepreneur, specializing in the reselling of scrap and building materials. His 93-year-old mother, Louise, has never been able to leave the property due to the massive hoard, which has also put her health and financial situation in jeopardy.
149	3	"Darlene"	June 12, 2023
Darlene is a dynamic, outspoken film makeup artist from Burnaby, British Columbia, Canada. She was never able to live a normal childhood as she had to spend the majority of her time taking care of her mother, sister, and grandmother, who all had severe health issues, until they all died years apart from each other. Since losing her loved ones, Darlene has acquired so much stuff that she has hoarded herself outside, leaving her to sleep under a tarp on her porch.
150	4	"Jim"	June 19, 2023
In Kannapolis, North Carolina, Vietnam War veteran Jim was previously assessed a $35,000 forced clean-up in 2016, but now that his hoard is worse, he risks losing his home permanently. He has also been traumatized by his time in Vietnam and the unexpected losses of his infant son, Robbie, and wife, Wanda.
151	5	"Rosella"	June 26, 2023
Rosella "Roz" of Winnipeg, Manitoba, Canada grew up with 12 siblings, and nothing went to waste in the family. When her first marriage fell apart, she met a man named Ben, and the two became hoarders, making the house unmanageable, before Ben eventually moved out. Roz became determined to clean her house after recovering from a car accident and when a storm flooded her basement in a short timeframe.
152	6	"Marjorie"	July 3, 2023
Marjorie of Sacramento, California has a hoard that has put her diabetic husband, Irv's, health at risk, as well as her own. Because Irv previously suffered two injuries due to the hoard and Marjorie has an upcoming hip surgery, they must get their house cleaned up to make their rehab much safer.

=== Season 15 (2024) ===
No. overall	No. in series	Title	Original release date
153	1	"Terri"	January 8, 2024
Over the past three years, Terri of Versailles, Missouri has been on the city's radar following a fire that was caused by electrical failure in her kitchen. Her hoarding escalated following the losses of her parents and ex-husband.
154	2	"Bob"	January 15, 2024
In St. Louis, Missouri, former commercial artist Bob has spent 51 years, not only restoring his classic Victorian home, but also hoarding it with antiques and paintings. Bob and his friends plan to return the house to its former glory as a museum, but first they must clean and properly restore it. He has also been recovering from a traumatic relationship, in which his now-deceased partner stole hundreds of thousands of dollars from him and attempted to murder him for his estate.
155	3	"John"	January 22, 2024
In San Diego, California, John's fascination with fixing and recycling has led him to collect a massive amount of stuff, leading to his entire property becoming cluttered. Now that Code Enforcement is on his case, he must clean up to avoid a hefty cleaning bill from the city.
156	4	"Destiny"	January 29, 2024
Since her childhood, Destiny of Cameron, North Carolina has been hoarding, which she has picked up from her mother, Gail, who died just two days before filming started. It spiraled out of control when her sister and nephew died in a car accident nearly 20 years earlier. Now living on her own, she must clean up to avoid getting evicted from her home.
157	5	"Where Are They Now? Carl / Eric"	February 5, 2024
This special follow-up episode covers the progress of two of the most memorable hoarders years after they faced a crisis due to their hoard. Carl from Season 13 has been through several surgeries and struggling to curb his hoarding since his clean-up, and a new hoard has built up in his house. Eric from Season 12 has been feeling lonely since his clean-up and has not been able to keep his home organized.
158	6	"Where Are They Now? Destiny / Terri"	February 5, 2024
This special follow-up episode covers the progress of two of the most memorable hoarders years after they faced a crisis due to their hoard. Shortly after her clean-up, Destiny from Season 15 moved out of her home and in with her brother, Roddy, until she could afford her own place, which she has since accomplished, and is no longer hoarding. Terri from Season 13 is now engaged to her longtime boyfriend, Kraig, but is still struggling to control her hoarding and has continued to buy things to store in the house she hoarded herself out of.
159	7	"Where Are They Now? John / Andy"	February 12, 2024
This special follow-up episode covers the progress of two of the most memorable hoarders years after they faced a crisis due to their hoard. Since John's clean-up from Season 15, he has been struggling with controlling his hoarding behavior and has refilled his home and yard. Andy from Season 14 had also been struggling with his hoard, but when his mother, Louise, recently died, he became motivated to clean it in her honor and is now getting ready to move to Arizona.
160	8	"Where Are They Now? Meryl / Janet"	February 12, 2024
This special follow-up episode covers the progress of two of the most memorable hoarders years after they faced a crisis due to their hoard. Meryl from Season 12 received aftercare therapy following her clean-up, but her hoard returned after she realized she could not afford a place to store her belongings. She and her husband, Kevin, have also been dealing with serious medical issues over the past three years and are considering moving to an assisted living facility. Janet from Season 2 was able to turn her lifestyle around and is now living in a much cleaner environment.
161	9	"David & Elizabeth"	February 26, 2024
In Ottawa, Ontario, Canada, David and Elizabeth have been addicted to shopping through television commercials for years, but now that their house is so filled, they risk putting their health in jeopardy and having their home condemned.
162	10	"Lori"	March 4, 2024
Lori of Kugluktuk, Nunavut, Canada lives in cluttered conditions with her 17-year-old son, Tajko, who has not been able to live a normal childhood due to his mother's hoard. The mess has isolated the two from the community, and they must clean up to get their social lives back on track.
163	11	"David & Odette"	March 11, 2024
In The Blue Mountains, Ontario, Canada, David has hoarded his dream home, which has put his marriage to his wife, Odette, on the rocks. To make matters worse, they have both developed heart and respiratory issues and are now in financial debt.
164	12	"Coral"	March 18, 2024
In Port Colborne, Ontario, Canada, Coral has a lot of hobbies that led her to start collecting, but her home has become so cluttered that it has put a strain on her relationship with her three daughters.

=== Season 16 (2024) ===
No. overall	No. in series	Title	Original release date
165	1	"Tim"	October 7, 2024
Vehicle enthusiast Tim of Ben Wheeler, Texas has a huge collection of old cars scattered all around his 10-acre property, plus a hoard of used car parts and tools. Now having acquired more than he can handle and facing hefty fines from the local fire department, he must clean everything out to prevent his wife, DeeDee, from filing for divorce.
166	2	"Where Are They Now? Nathan / Kathy"	October 7, 2024
This special follow-up episode covers the progress of two of the most memorable hoarders from Season 8. Despite curbing his hoarding behavior, Nathan decided that his top priority was repairing his relationship with his parents, so he moved to Starke, Florida a month after his clean-up and spent the next six years living with his father before moving in with a friend. Since her clean-up, Kathy has been struggling to control her hoarding, but the two downstairs apartments in her triplex are still clean and she has been renting them out to get her financial situation back on track.
167	3	"Montie & Sherry"	October 14, 2024
As a retired mechanic, Montie has always had a passion for any projects involving car parts, but the front yard of his Mentone, California home is so cluttered that Code Enforcement has had to pay him many visits. But he is not the only one at fault, as his wife, Sherry, has contributed her share to creating the massive hoard inside their house. For the past 25 years, Montie and Sherry have kept the inside of their house a secret from their three daughters, but after Montie suffered an accident that required him to be admitted to the hospital four months ago, their oldest daughter, Audora, became aware of the horrific conditions and is now threatening to call APS. Update: Shortly after the filming of the episode, Audora unexpectedly died.
168	4	"Where Are They Now? Claire & Vance / Forrest"	October 14, 2024
This special follow-up episode covers the progress of two of the most memorable hoarders years after they faced a crisis due to their hoard. Shortly after the previous update on Claire and Vance from Season 5, Vance died and Claire remains committed to honoring his memory by putting more effort into organizing their home and starting an online business to sell their books. Eight months before the show returned to his house, Forrest from Season 12 also died, and he left his house to his son, AJ, who sold all his father's belongings to remodel the house and get ready to rent it out.
169	5	"Terri"	October 21, 2024
Terri has lived in the same Antigo, Wisconsin house for 48 years and has not cleaned it out once. Her hoarding was triggered by an abusive three-year marriage, which also led to a strained relationship with her daughter, Kori. Terri's roof and furnace are in need of repairs, but to get them fixed, she must clean out her house to prevent the inspectors from condemning it.
170	6	"Where Are They Now? Tim / Montie & Sherry"	October 21, 2024
This special follow-up episode covers the progress of two of the most memorable hoarders from the current season. Although Tim has kept his property clean and repaired his relationship with his wife, DeeDee, he is still tempted to bring more things into his house. Montie and Sherry have also kept the inside of their house clean, but they still have been struggling to bring their front yard up to code. They also have not seen the rest of their family since the unexpected death of their oldest daughter, Audora.
171	7	"Bruce & Cathy"	October 28, 2024
For over 30 years, Bruce and Cathy have been addicted to shopping at thrift stores, but now their Jackson, Mississippi house is so cluttered and packed to the roof it has begun to impact their health.
172	8	"Where Are They Now? Randy / Peggy"	October 28, 2024
This special follow-up episode covers the progress of two of the most memorable hoarders years after they faced a crisis due to their hoard. Randy from Season 4 has continued to add to his amusement park memorabilia museum, which is still not open to the public, and plans to open a giant family fun center, hoping to create a legacy for himself. Peggy from Season 13 recently died and left her house to her daughter, Alissa, who then sold it to a close neighbor of her mother's.
173	9	"Mary"	November 4, 2024
Mary of Ann Arbor, Michigan has always been a collector of fine things, but her hobby turned into hoarding after her 15-year marriage ended in a divorce and she lost both her parents. With a knee surgery coming up in less than two weeks, Mary must clean out her house to make it suitable for her recovery.
174	10	"Where Are They Now? Sybil / Ruth"	November 4, 2024
This special follow-up episode covers the progress of two of the most memorable hoarders years after they faced a crisis due to their hoard. Since Sybil's clean-up from Season 8, a new hoard has built up inside and outside her house, and she now has numerous health issues. Ruth's hoarding from Season 6 is now not as bad as it was at the time of her first appearance on the show, but over a week before the show returned to her house, she lost her stepson and sister.
175	11	"Angel"	November 11, 2024
Angel has been addicted to shopping for years, but with every room of her Milwaukee, Wisconsin home filled with clothes, shoes, and purses, it is not safe for her grandchildren to come and visit.
176	12	"Where Are They Now? Dale / Jim"	November 11, 2024
This special follow-up episode covers the progress of two of the most memorable hoarders years after they faced a crisis due to their hoard. Dale from Season 10 was able to move back into his house after his clean-up, but five months before the show returned, a fire broke out in his house, causing extensive damage and forcing him to move to a nearby apartment. Jim from Season 14 has been struggling with changing his behavior and a new hoard has built up in his house.
177	13	"Linda"	November 18, 2024
Linda's Satellite Beach, Florida home is so filled with garbage and cat feces that she has been living with her son, Zach, and his fiancé, MacKenzie. Unfortunately, she has no respect for their house rules and Code Enforcement has been on her case for the past 15 years. Her hoarding was triggered by a series of misfortunes, including losing her eyesight after getting assaulted by her ex-boyfriend, suffering a miscarriage, and dealing with her ex-husband, Scott's, alcohol addiction.
178	14	"Christine"	November 25, 2024
Christine comes from a family of hoarders and her Carleton Place, Ontario, Canada home that is so cluttered with her belongings, as well as her late father's, that it has become a serious fire risk. She also fears that her two autistic teenage daughters, Raven and Katherine, will pick up her behavior.
179	15	"Susan"	December 2, 2024
Susan of Lake Charlotte, Nova Scotia, Canada struggles with depression and has turned to shopping to cope with her feelings. Adding to her problems is dealing with the loss of her younger brother, Chuck, from 10 years ago and having to raise his four sons, in addition to her own two children, Raymond and Nicky. Susan's sister, Terri, who is a longtime volunteer firefighter, is concerned that if Susan's house and hoard catches fire, she will never get out of there alive.

== "Update" Episodes ==
Number	From Season	Title	Airdate
1	2	Deborah/Jim	June 9, 2014
2	4	Phyllis/Janet	June 16, 2014
3	4	Stacey/Roi	June 23, 2014
4	2	Janet/Christina	June 30, 2014
5	4	Randy/Vicki	July 7, 2014
6	2	Julie/Shannon	August 21, 2016
7	2	Augustine	August 28, 2016
8	6	Doug/Ruth	September 4, 2016
9	1	Jennifer & Ron/Jill	September 4, 2016
10	5	Verna/Joanne	September 11, 2016
11	5	Anna/Claire & Vance	September 11, 2016
12	7	Laura	December 25, 2016
13	7	Michelle/Yama	January 1, 2017
14	7	Ruthann	January 8, 2017
15	7	Joyce/Kimberly	January 15, 2017
16	7	Doris/T'resa	January 29, 2017
17	7	Brian/Coral	January 29, 2017
18	7	David/Nora	February 12, 2017
19	7	Michelle/Mary	February 19, 2017
20	7	Cynthia/Ricky	February 26, 2017
21	8	Maggie/Ann	March 5, 2017
22	9	Leza/Linda	May 16, 2017
23	9	Stanks/Anne	May 23, 2017
24	8	Judy	May 30, 2017
25	8	Ruby/Mary	June 6, 2017
26	8	Roxann/Barbara	June 13, 2017
27	8	Celia/Nathan	June 20, 2017
28	8	Dorothy & David/Doris	June 27, 2017
29	8	Jackie/Ed & Connie	July 11, 2017
30	8	Kevin/Elmira	July 18, 2017
31	8	Ellen/Sybil	July 25, 2017
32	9	Sandra	April 6, 2019
