= Eli Todd =

American psychiatrist

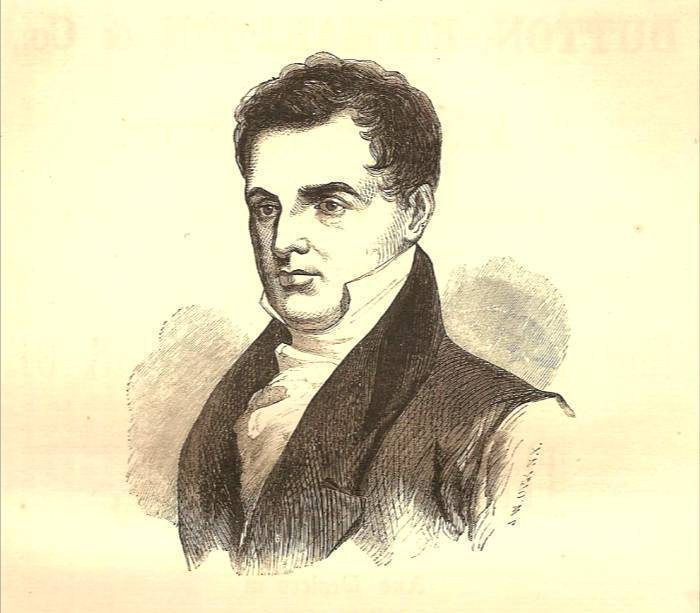
- Dr. Eli Todd

Personal details
- Born: July 22, 1769 New Haven, Connecticut
- Died: November 17, 1833 (aged 64)
- Resting place: Old North Cemetery; Hartford, Hartford County, Connecticut; 41.4557°N 72.4100°W
- Spouse: Rachel Hills

Dr. Eli Todd (July 22, 1769 – November 17, 1833) was a pioneer in the treatment of the mentally ill. His efforts in the medical field of mental care and smallpox treatment had a significant impact on not only the residents of his town, Farmington, Connecticut, but contributed to the establishment of high standards for the rest of the newly formed nation.

== Early life ==
Eli Todd was born in 1769 in New Haven, Connecticut. He had two sisters, named Polly and Eunice. His mother was Mary Rowe, and his father, a New Haven merchant, died in 1776, a few months before his 7th birthday. He was then sent to live with his great uncle, Reverend Dr. Todd, who resided in East Guilford, in the same state. He remained with Reverend Dr. Todd until he was ten, when he was then under the care and instruction of Reverend Dr. Goodrich, of Durham, Connecticut, during which time he was introduced to the practice of medicine. He began to attend Yale College at the age of fourteen in 1783, and graduated with honors at the age of eighteen in 1787. His graduation was a significant milestone in his medical career. He studied medicine as an apprentice under Dr. Ebenezer Beardsley of New Haven, and began his own medical practice in Farmington at the age of 21. He soon became the favorite practitioner of the wealthy class in the community. He used gentle treatment methods as opposed to the harsh remedies commonly used at that time. Todd was 23 years old when he established Hospital Rock on Rattlesnake Mountain. He helped found the Hartford County and Connecticut Medical Societies, and was later a member of the Conversation Club. He also founded the Society of Medical Friends in Farmington, where doctors from around Connecticut could share treatments and discuss opinions.

== Accomplishments ==
=== Hospital Rock ===
In 1791, working with Dr. Theodore Wadsworth, Todd gained permission to start a hospital near the present-day Farmington/Plainville border for smallpox inoculation. The facility, commonly called Hospital Rock, is found deep in the second-growth hardwood forest of Rattlesnake Mountain in Connecticut and was used from 1792 to 1794. Though the building is no longer present, the nearby rock ledge upon which patients would socialize remains. It was this rock that lent the facility its name. At this location, they could also receive mail and various packages.

The actual rock has been marked with over 100 distinct carvings, 66 of which are the full names of contemporary patients. Other carvings include initials, names, and dates. Prior to widespread vaccination, the treatment at Hospital Rock was extremely important. Hospital Rock was no longer needed when the smallpox vaccination was available and eventually faded away into the woods.

=== Contributions to mental health care ===
Todd was a pioneer doctor in the field of psychiatry. At the time, treatment of the mentally ill was typically inhumane: “A mentally ill patient was locked up in an insane asylum with little or no care and treated as if they were a criminal”. Prior to 1800, it was common for people deemed mad to be locked away and forgotten about. Some individuals, such as Todd and Dorothea Dix wanted more humane care for the mentally ill as they were appalled at the treatment of such people. The Connecticut Retreat for the Insane was built in 1823, and was opened to admissions in 1824. Eli Todd was its first director. It was often referred to as the Hartford Retreat for the Insane, and is now known as The Institute of Living. The Hartford Retreat for the Insane cost $12,000 to build and could serve up to 40 patients at a time. “It cost $3.00 a week for a state resident and $4.00 a week for an out of state resident”.

=== Alcoholism treatment and theory ===
The widespread consumption of alcohol was recognized as a problem by Dr. Eli Todd in 1812. In a conversation with Edward Hooker on March 30, 1812, he stated that there was no single solution to alcoholism. “He advised a 3-pronged attack that was as follows: there should be an association of respectable men who would make it unfashionable to take ardent spirits; work houses of ‘idle, drinking persons’ after their third conviction for drunkenness; and heavy taxes on imported and domestic liquor”.

Dr. Eli Todd also viewed alcohol as the “prominent evil of the day”. On February 22, 1842, the Washington Society of Farmington was formed. They practiced total abstinence, and employed social pressure for temperance in Farmington. By 1847, 569 people were part of this society. This was a step forward as part of Dr. Eli Todd's attack against alcoholism.

== Personal life ==
After graduating Yale at the age of 18, Todd had a two-year apprenticeship in Farmington, Connecticut. After finishing his apprenticeship, he spent the next 25 years serving as Farmington's resident doctor, retiring in 1815. He often consulted with farmers to help them with the productivity of their produce. Todd concluded that “the return to social and political stability during the first years of independence was undoubtedly eased by the availability of unlimited land to the west”.

He was not a very good businessman and although his fame grew statewide, his wealth never swelled to match until he became director of the Connecticut Retreat. In 1796, shortly after starting his work in Farmington, he married Rachel Hills. In the same year, his half-brother Michael died at sea. In 1797, his sister Polly died of spotted fever. His mother died in 1806. In 1811, Rachel's brother Reuben died, and Todd and his wife adopted his two daughters Theresa and Jennet. Rachel died in 1825, and Todd subsequently married her younger sister, Catherine. She would outlive him by 33 years, dying herself in 1866.

His sister Eunice died by suicide after a long history of depression and the death of her son. Todd received a letter from Eunice's husband in August 1829, which told of her death. Todd had thought he had cured her, multiple times, but she still had episodes, and when she had to attend to a large farm in empty Vermont alone, she was pushed over the edge. This began his theory that mental retardation (insanity at the time) was a disease and had a cause and possibly a cure. This began his revolutionary treatments, and what made the government give so much money for the mental hospital to be built.
