= The OCD Project =

- Genre: Reality
- Starring: David Tolin
- Country of origin: United States
- Original language: English
- No. of seasons: 1
- No. of episodes: 8

Production
- Executive producers: Adam Greener; J.D. Roth; Jeff Olde; Jill Holmes; Matt Assmus; Noah Pollack; Todd Nelson
- Running time: 42 minutes
- Production company: 3 Ball Productions

Original release
- Network: VH1
- Release: May 27 – July 15, 2010

The OCD Project is an American reality television series that debuted on May 27, 2010. The series follows David Tolin and his exposure-based treatment of six patients living together in a Southern California mansion. The treatment, called exposure and response prevention (ERP), is the leading evidence-based treatment for OCD.

== Cast ==
Cast Member	Presenting OCD Symptom
Arine Hayrapetian	Fear of running over pedestrians (specifically babies) while driving, Fear of contamination, Fear of getting a disease (specifically HIV).
Traci Portillo	Fear of her son's death (specifically by cancer)
Cody Lindemuth	Fear of turning into someone else
Jerry Garrison	Fear of becoming a "psycho killer"
Kevin Suscavage	Fear of hurting someone with a single thought (putting a hex on someone) (left the show episode 6)
Kristen Love	Fear of contamination (specifically from males)

== Episodes ==
No.	Title	Original release date	U.S. viewers (millions)
1	"Arrival"	May 27, 2010	0.55
2	"What's Your Problem"	June 3, 2010	0.84
3	"Today It Begins"	June 10, 2010	0.54
4	"Family Therapy"	June 17, 2010	0.50
5	"The Hospital"	June 24, 2010	0.44
6	"Extreme Exposures"	July 1, 2010	0.54
7	"Home Environments"	July 8, 2010	0.41
8	"Last Day of Treatments and 3 Months Later Followups"	July 15, 2010	0.39
