= Institute of Living =

Psychiatric facility in Connecticut, US

Coordinates: 41.7516°N 72.6818°W

Center Building (2026)

The Institute of Living (IOL) is a comprehensive psychiatric facility in Hartford, Connecticut, that offers care across the spectrum of psychiatric services, including crisis evaluation, inpatient psychiatric care, group homes, specialized educational programs, outpatient programs, and addiction recovery services.

== History ==
The hospital was built in 1823 and was opened to patients in 1824, under the direction of Eli Todd. It was initially called the Connecticut Retreat for the Insane, though later changed names to the Hartford Retreat before adopting its current name. At that time, the institute was among only four facilities of its kind in the nation. It was capable of accommodating 40 to 60 patients who were segregated by "sex, nature of disease, habits of life and the wishes of their friends." The hospital's 35 acres (14 ha) campus was landscaped by Frederick Law Olmsted in the 1860s.

Dr. C. Charles Burlingame was named as superintendent in 1939. His vision was for the facility to become one-third hospital, one-third university/educational environment and one-third resort. This included adding residential cottages, a nine-hole golf course, indoor and outdoor pools and tennis courts, all of which are gone today.

In the late 1980s, the IOL staffed 450 beds, with many patients staying for long-term periods, though by the early 1990s, the IOL reduced its number of beds to 150 and length of stay to a maximum 28 days.

The IOL and Hartford Hospital's Department of Psychiatry merged in 1994. As a result of the merger, the IOL could accept Medicaid patients. There were many new programs including the Schizophrenia Rehabilitation Program, Anxiety Disorders Center, and LGBTQ offerings.

Amid scrutiny into Catholic Church sexual abuse cases, the Institute of Living was accused of sheltering priests for decades so they could avoid discovery and prosecution. The Institute of Living maintains it was deceived by the Catholic Church, that the Church concealed information from doctors, and that it bears no responsibility for the conspiracy to perpetuate priest abuse.

== Historic grounds ==
Rare or unusually large tree species make up the IOL grounds, redesigned by Frederick Law Olmsted and his associate, Jacob Weidenmann. These include several New England champion trees on the grounds, including the Ginkgo, which is also one of the biggest in the United States, the pecan, the bur oak and the Japanese Zelkova.

On August 4, 2020, the pecan tree was destroyed by Tropical Storm Isaias. The pecan tree, in the middle of the central lawn, was one of two in Connecticut and was a New England champion for 30 years until a lightning strike caused significant damage a decade ago. There is evidence to suggest that the pecan tree predates Olmsted.
