= Museo Nacional de Aeronáutica de Argentina =

Coordinates: 34°40′18.05″S 58°38′12.45″W

National Aeronautics Museum Brigadier Edmundo Civati Bernasconi
- Museo Nacional de Aeronáutica; Brigadier Edmundo Civati Bernasconi
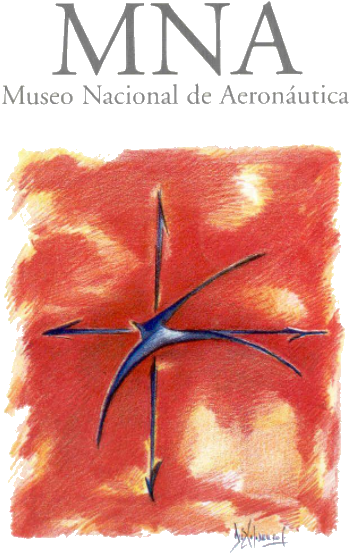

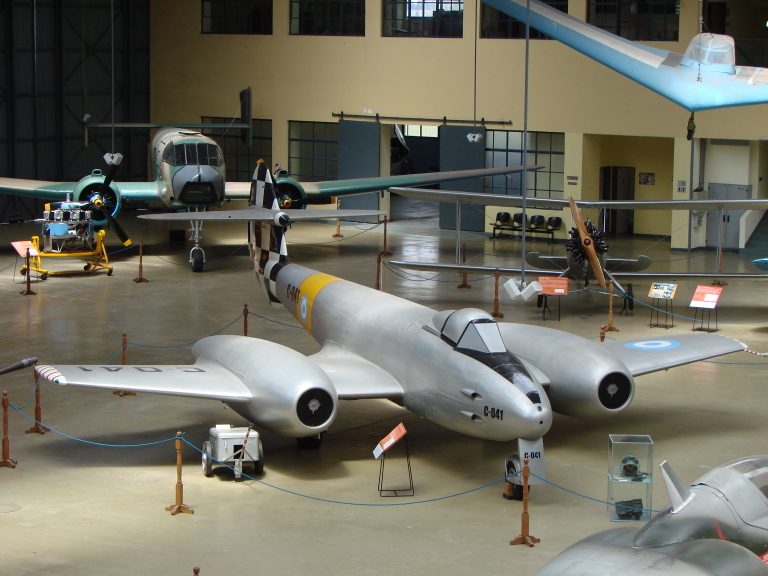
- Main hall, with Gloster Meteor (foreground), Huanquero (background left), Focke Wulf 44 (background right), and Urubú (hanging from roof)
- Established: January 13, 1960; 66 years ago
- Location: Morón, Buenos Aires, Argentina
- Type: Aviation museum
- Director: Vicecomodoro Walter Olmedo (2019)
- Website: argentina.gob.ar/museomoron

The National Aeronautics Museum "Brigadier Edmundo Civati Bernasconi" (Spanish: Museo Nacional de Aeronáutica) is an Argentine museum located in the city of Morón, Buenos Aires. Established in 1960, the museum is dedicated to the history of aviation, in particular the Argentine Air Force.

Its collection includes some unique aircraft, like the Pulqui I and Pulqui II jet prototypes, the Urubú flying wing glider, the I.Ae. 22 DL trainer, and a Latécoère XXV flown by Antoine de Saint-Exupéry.

== History ==
The museum was created on January 13, 1960, by decree 264/60 of the President of the Republic, its first director and main supporter being Brigadier Edmundo Civatti Bernasconi.

It was initially located at the Aeroparque Jorge Newbery, where the aircraft were displayed in the grounds without protection from the weather. In the 1980s it was proposed to relocate the museum to provide protection to the aircraft, a new facility close to the Ezeiza airport was suggested.

In 2001 the museum was relocated to the Morón Airport and Air Base, site of Argentina's first international airport, where hangars were available to protect most of the collection.

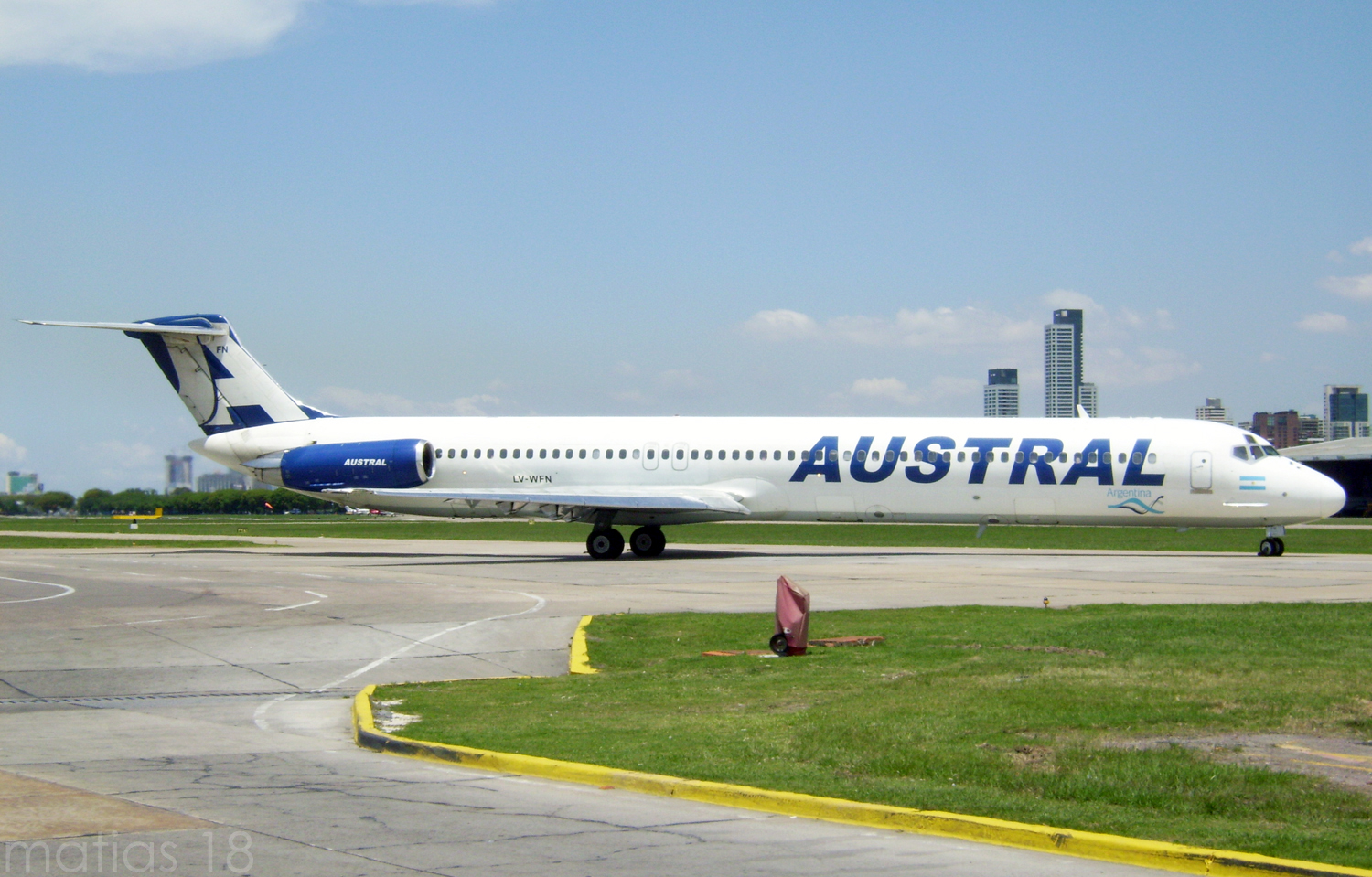
McDonnell Douglas MD-81 LV-WFN in 2009; donated to the museum in 2013

In February 2013, a McDonnell Douglas MD-81 (ex-Austral, LV-WFN) was donated to the museum, for restoration and exhibition. This aircraft is notable for having the highest number of flight hours worldwide for its type (70,444 hours in 60,350 cycles) as of March 2012, when it was retired.

== Facilities ==
The museum is divided in different halls, dedicated to specific themes:

- Motores: displaying aviation engines.
- Malvinas: which includes a Grumman HU-16 Albatross amphibian used in the 1970s to establish a route line between Comodoro Rivadavia and Malvinas (Falkland Islands).
- Antartida: for material used in Antarctica.
- Pioneros: dedicated to Aviation pioneers.
- Torre de control: details the interior of a control tower.
- Pegaso: to host events.
- Icaro: coffee shop.

In addition there is a small gift shop.

== Collections ==
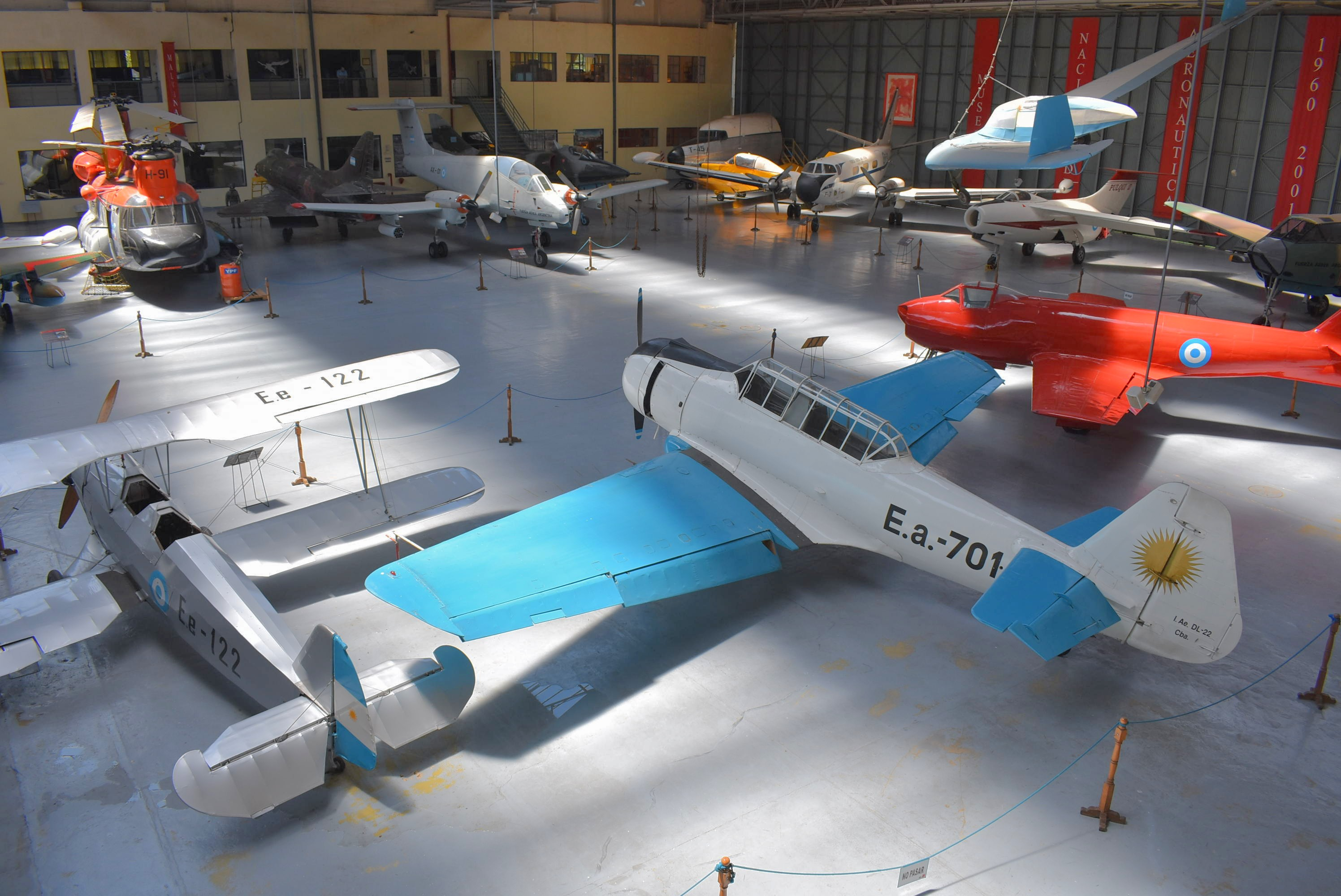
Part of the collection in one of the hangars

=== Aircraft ===
Aircraft on display include:

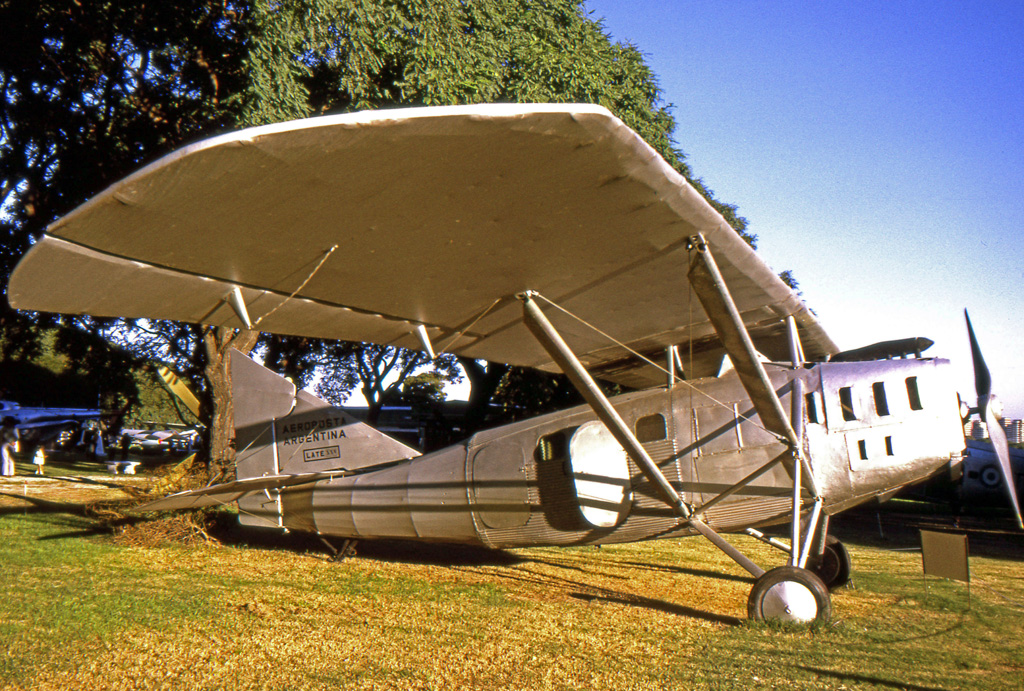
Latecoere 25, Aeroparque Jorge Newbery, 1975

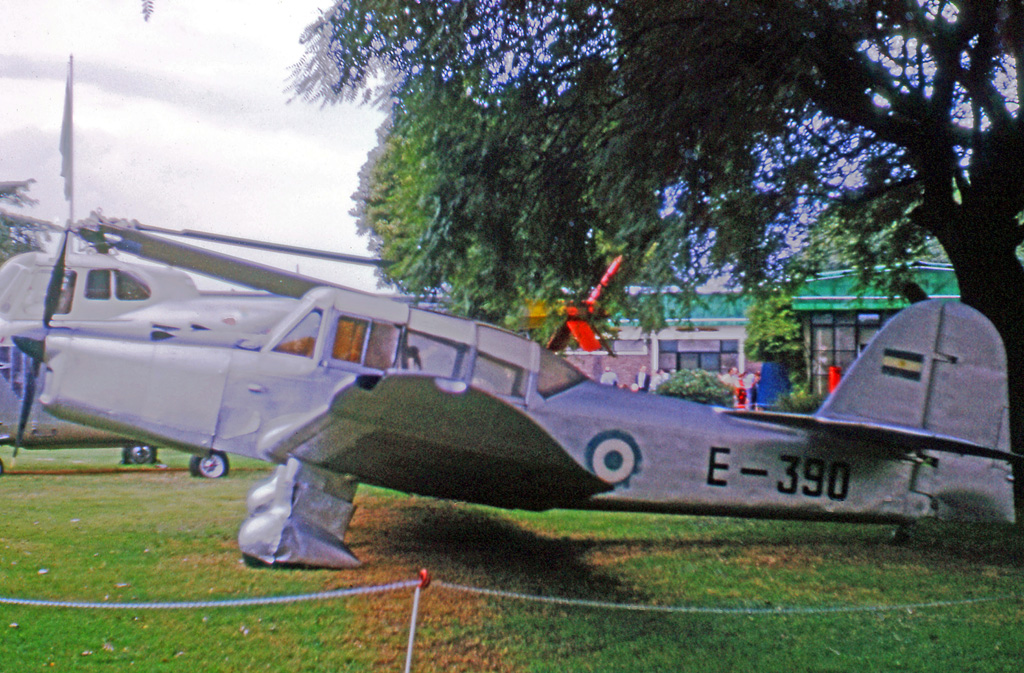
Percival Prentice, Aeroparque Jorge Newbery, 1972

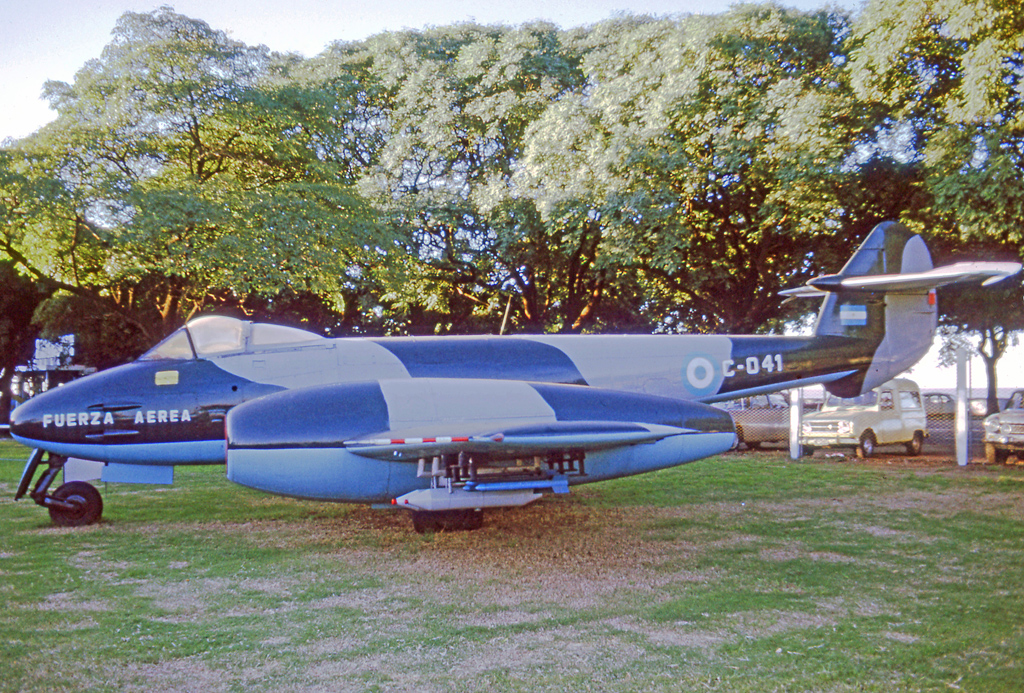
Gloster Meteor, at the previous location of the MNA, Aeroparque Jorge Newbery, 1975

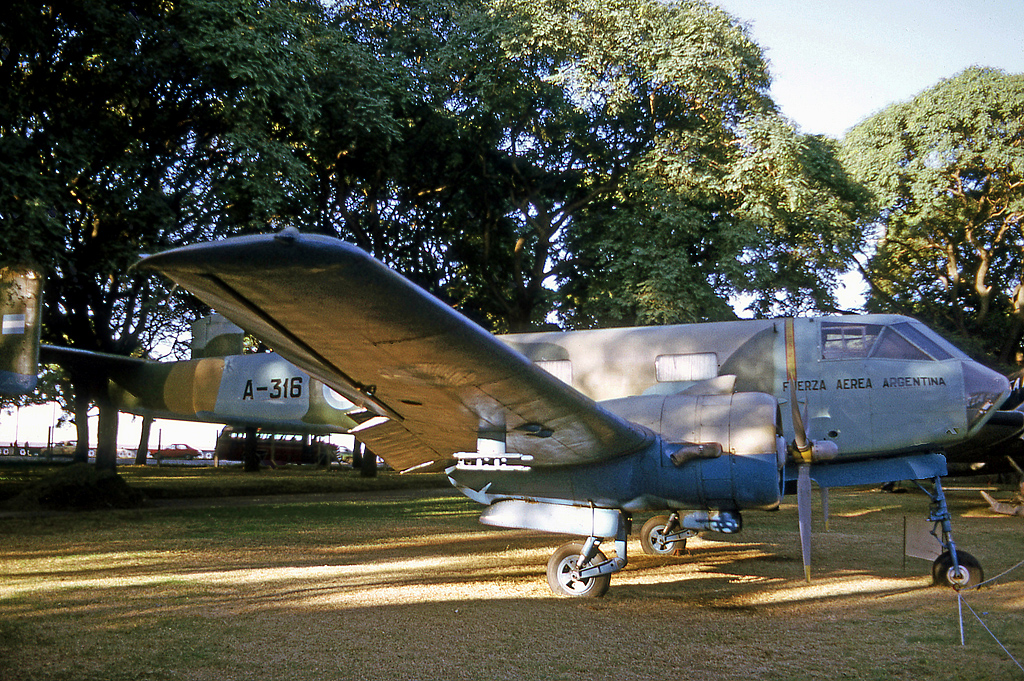
IA 35 Huanquero, Aeroparque Jorge Newbery, 1975

Fixed-wing

- Avro Lincoln B.2 B-004, on display as B-010
- Beechcraft AT-11 Kansan
- Blériot XI
- Boeing 737 LV-WTK, donated by Aerolíneas Argentinas
- Bristol Freighter 1A
- Dassault Mirage III versions C, DA (I-002) and EA (I-011)
- de Havilland Beaver
- de Havilland Dove
- DINFIA IA 35b Huanquero A-305
- Douglas A-4 Skyhawk, versions A-4P (C-207) and A-4C (C-322)
- Douglas C-47A-85-DL TA-05, modified as antarctic transport
- Douglas C-54 (cabin)
- English Electric Canberra B Mk.62 B-109, the last one to complete a mission in the Falklands War
- Fairchild 82D LV-FHZ (ex-T-152, msn 66)
- Fairchild Swearingen Metro II (currently under restoration)
- Farman HF.7
- Fiat G.46, post-war military trainer
- Hercules C-130B
- FMA IA 22 DL (c/n 728), trainer built by the Fabrica Militar de Aviones
- FMA IA 27 Pulqui I prototype, the first jet designed and built in Latin America
- FMA IA 33 Pulqui II prototype 5, first swept-wing jet fighter designed and built in Latin America
- FMA IA 41 Urubú, flying wing glider designed by Reimar Horten
- FMA IA 50 Guaraní II F-31 and LQ-JXY
- FMA IA 53 Mamboretá
- FMA IA 58 Pucará
- FMA IA 63 Pampa EX-03 mock-up
- Focke Wulf FW-44J, biplane trainer
- Fokker F.27-600 T-42
- Gloster Meteor F.4 I-041, ex-EE586
- Grumman HU-16B Albatross
- Hiller UH-12E
- Hughes 369HE
- Israeli Aircraft Industries Dagger
- Junkers Ju 52/3m (WNr.4043)
- Latécoère XXV flown by Antoine de Saint-Exupéry for Aeroposta Argentina
- Max-Holste 1521 Broussard
- Morane-Saulnier MS.502
- Morane-Saulnier MS.760 Paris
- North American F-86F Sabre
- Percival Prentice T.1
- Rockwell Aero Commander 500U
- Vickers Viking 1B T-9
- Wright Flyer replica

Rotary wing

- Bell UH-1H
- Boeing Chinook
- Bolkow Bo 105
- Cierva C.30 autogiro
- Sikorsky S-55 helicopter, H-04
- Sikorsky S-61R H-02 used by the Presidential flight

=== Engines ===
- Napier Sabre IIA inline
- Packard DR-980 radial diesel

=== Other ===
Other exhibits include:

- Anasagasti car, used by the Argentine Air Force
- Pampa tractor

== Gallery ==
=== Aircraft displayed ===
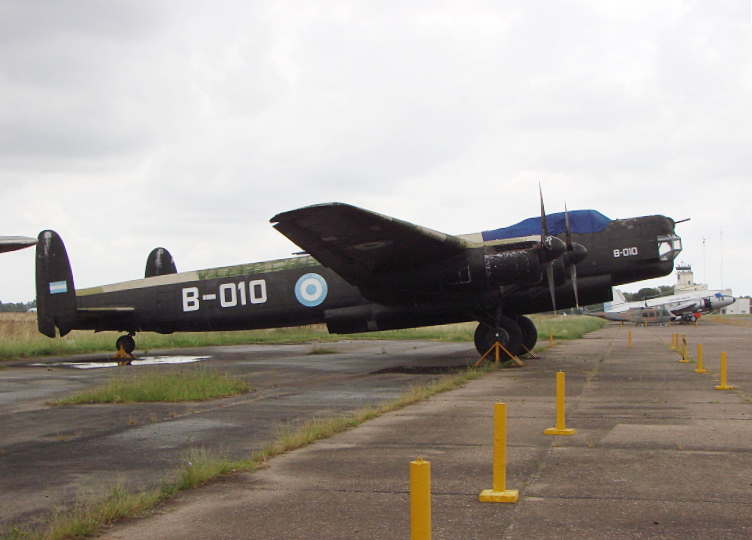
Avro Lincoln B.2

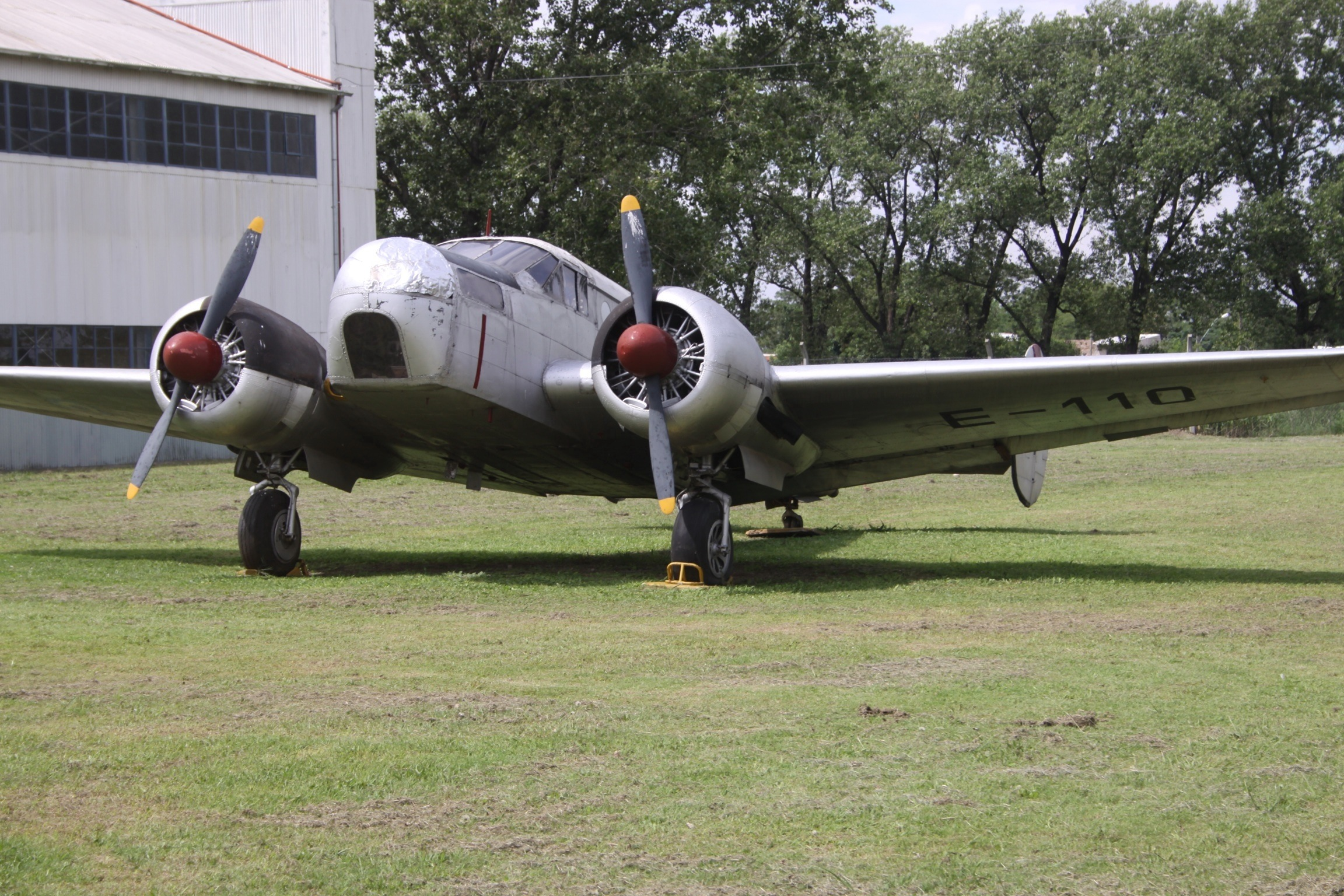
Beechcraft AT-11 Kansan E-110

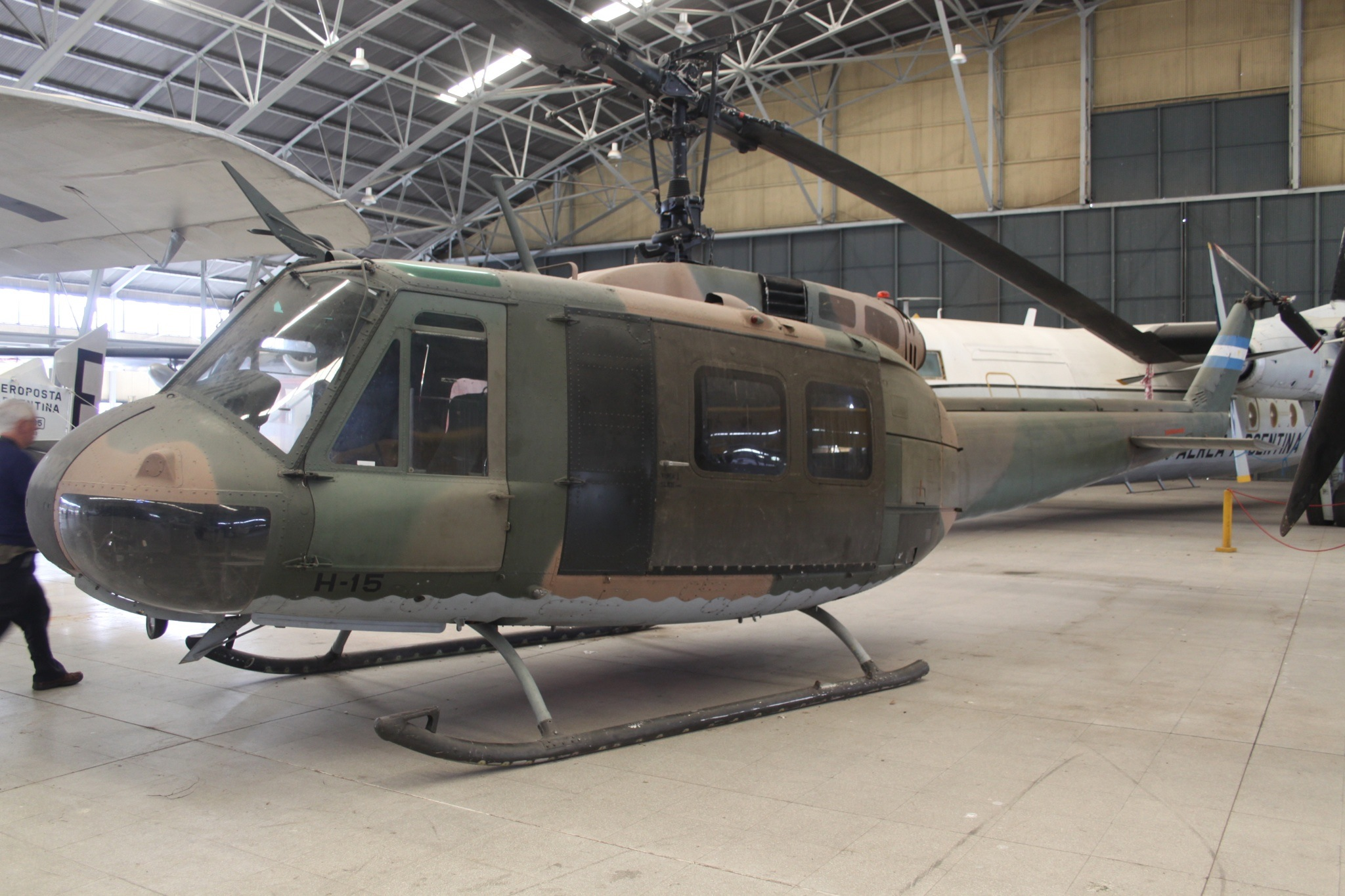
Bell 205 (UH-1) H-15

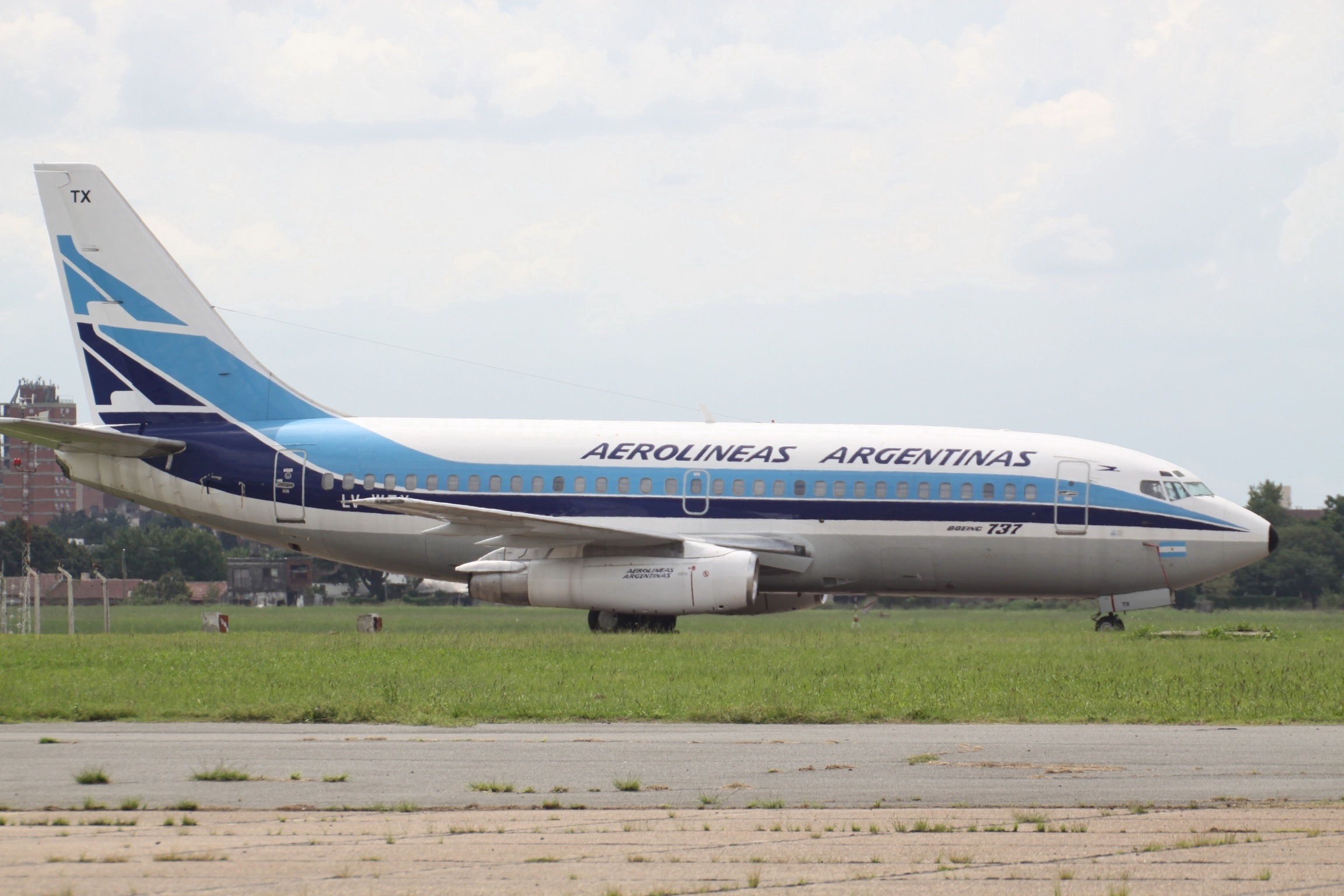
Boeing 737 LV-WTX

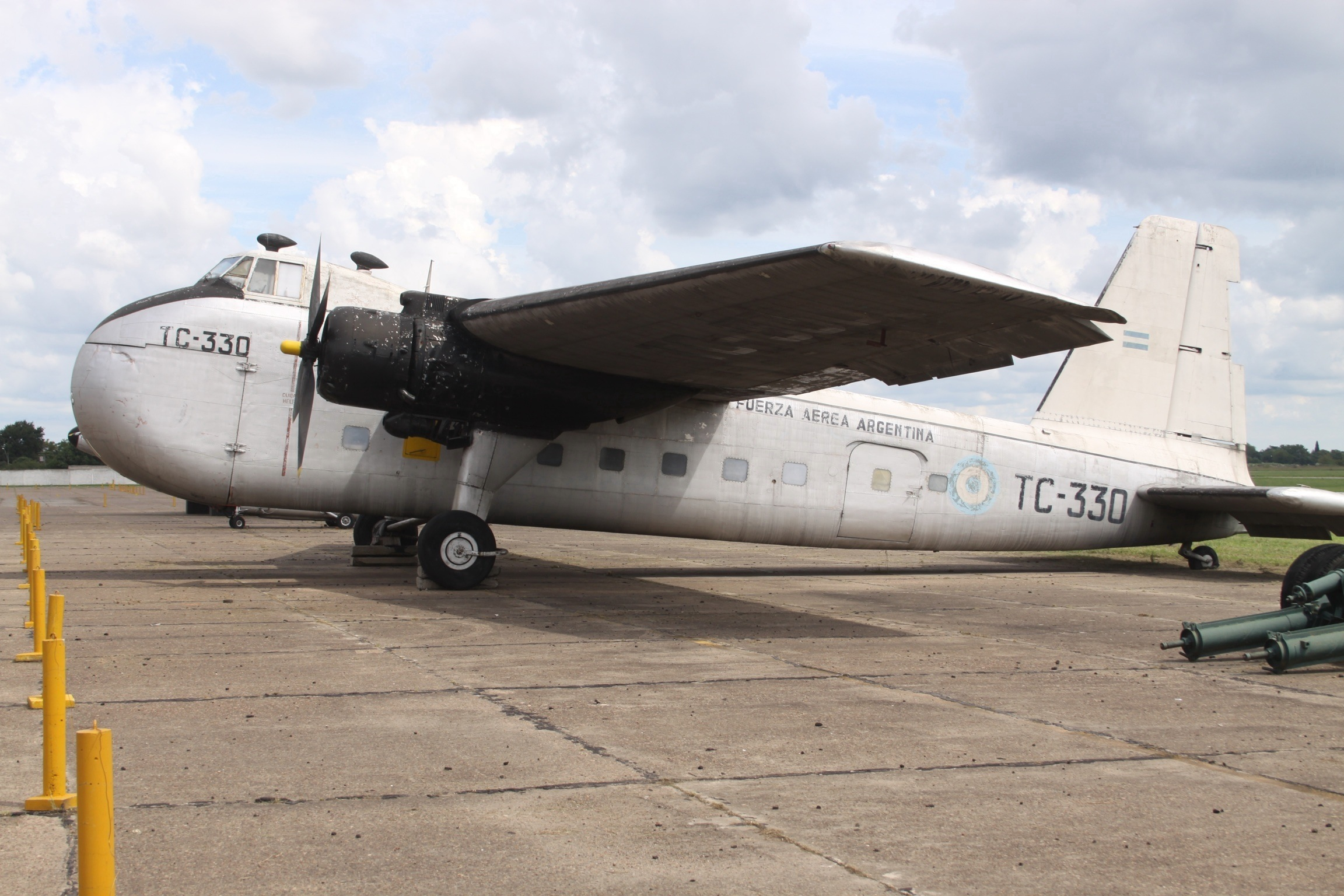
Bristol B170 Freighter

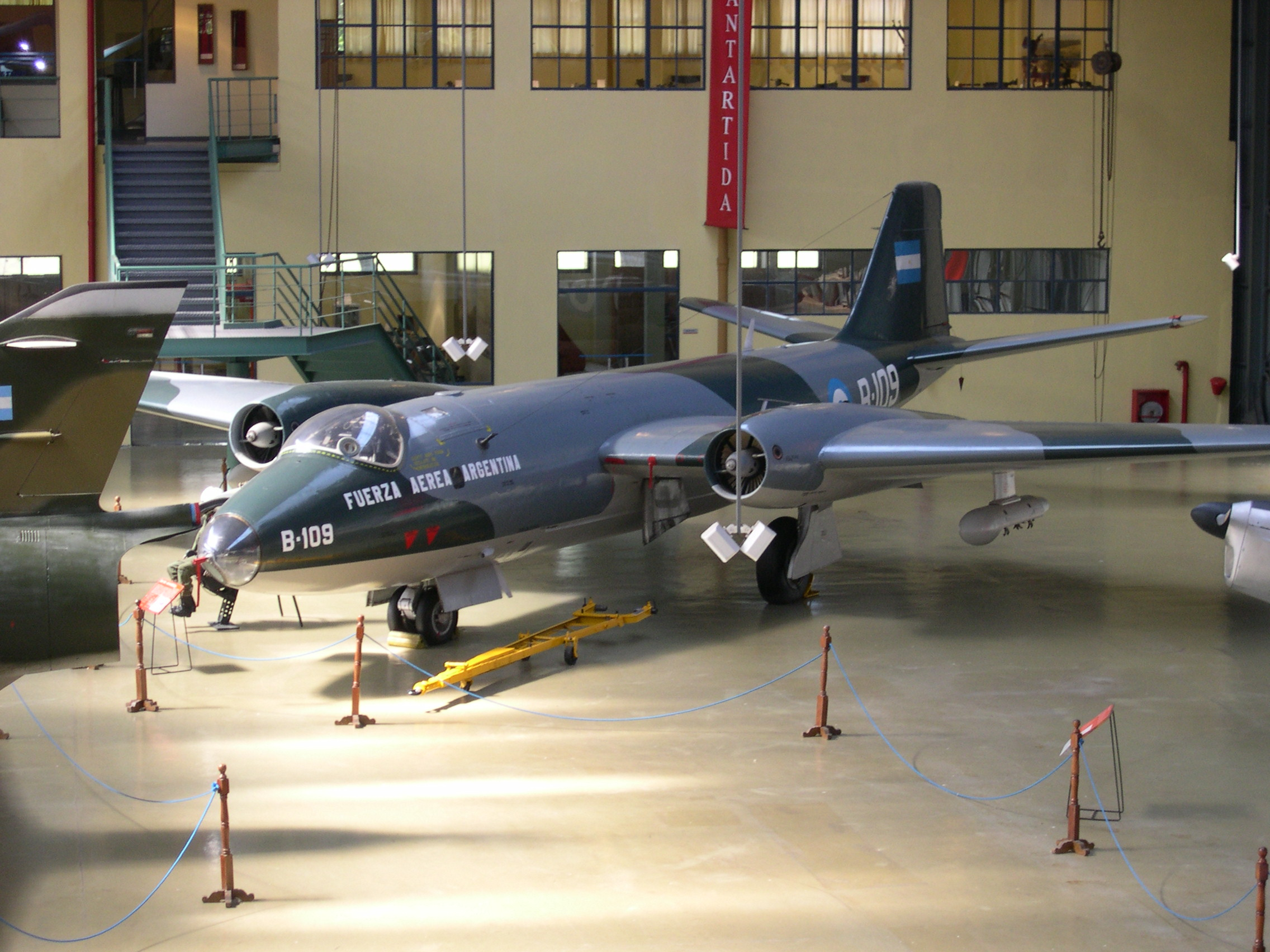
English Electric Canberra

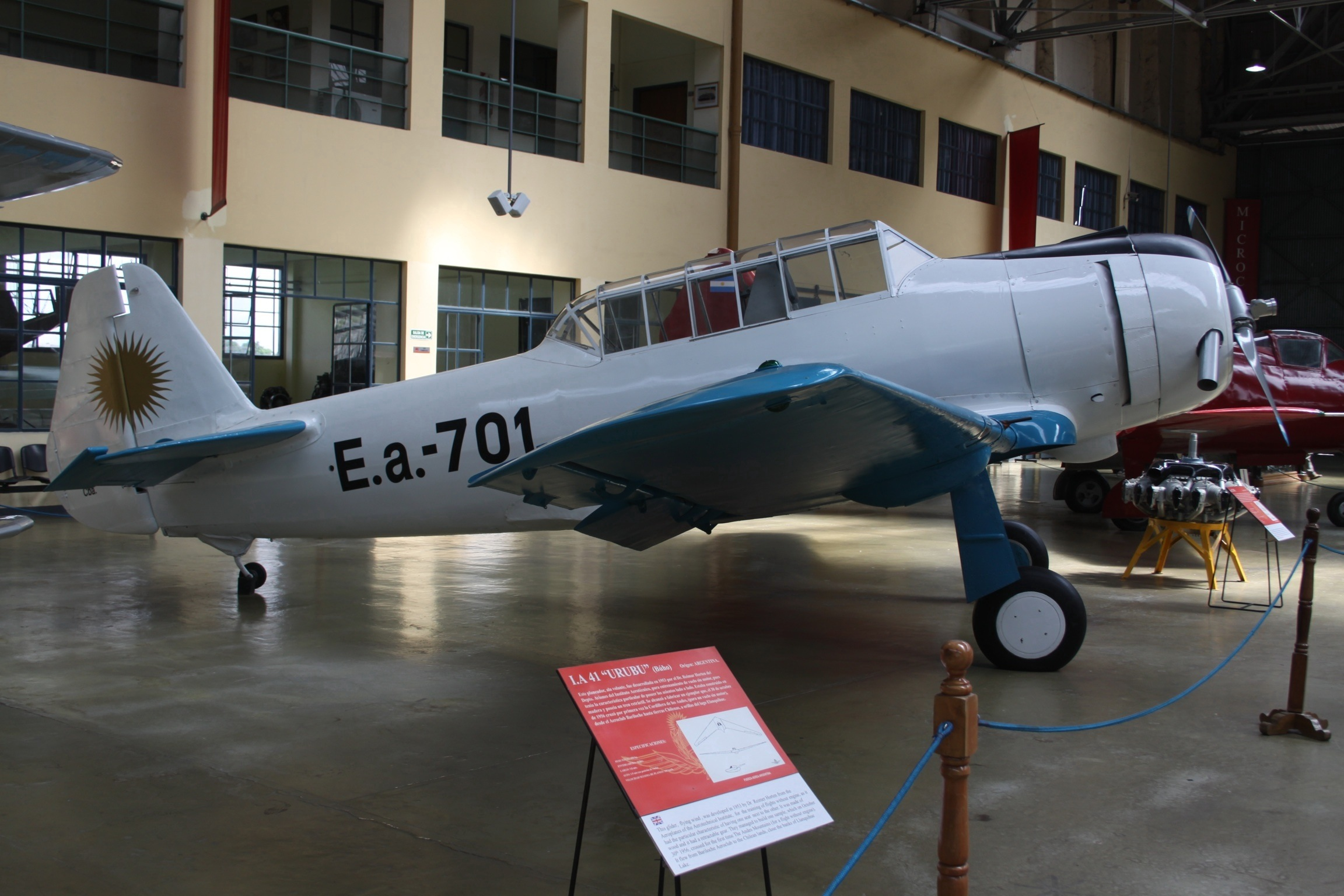
Dinfia I.Ae.22DL

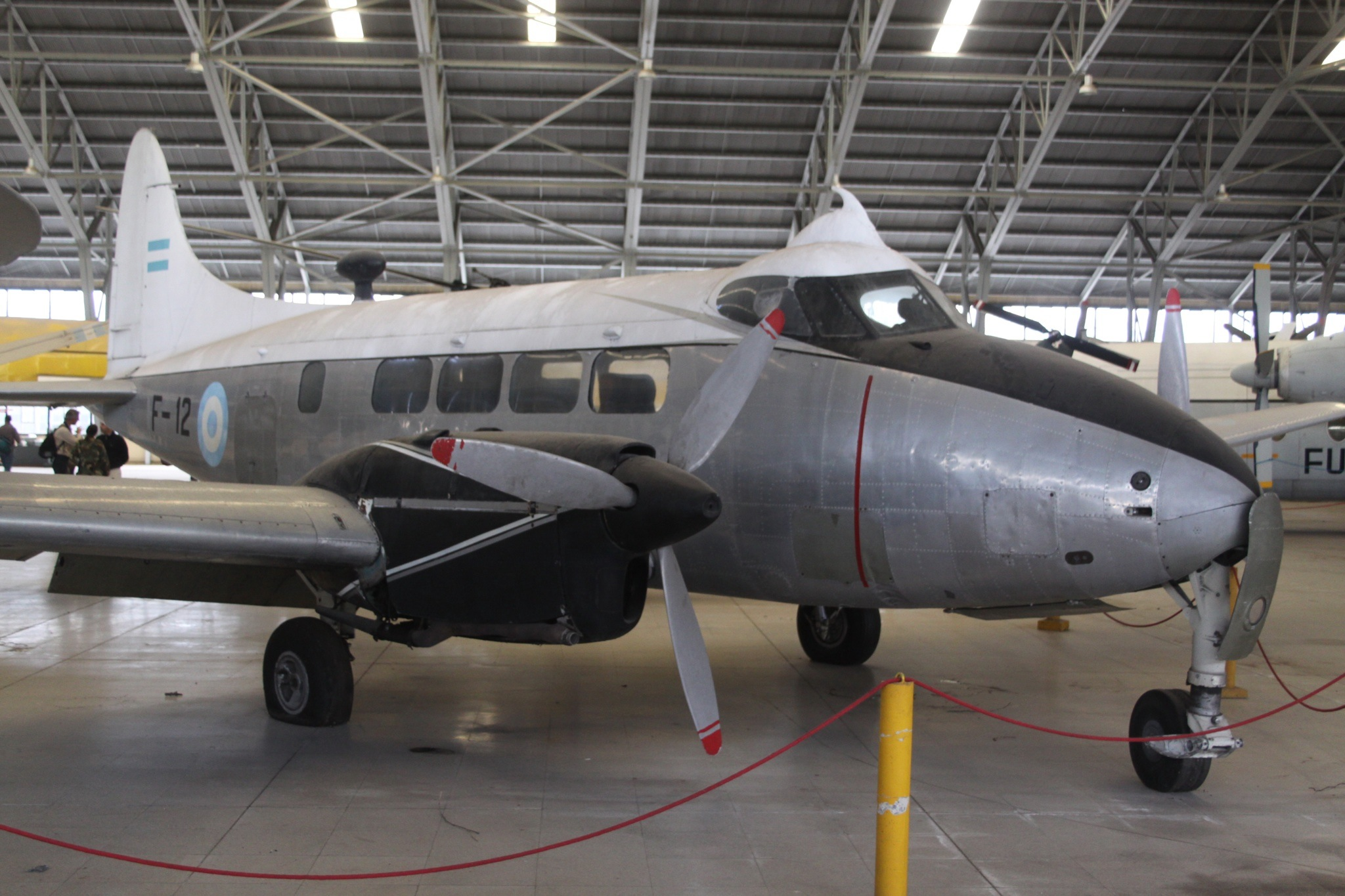
de Havilland Dove

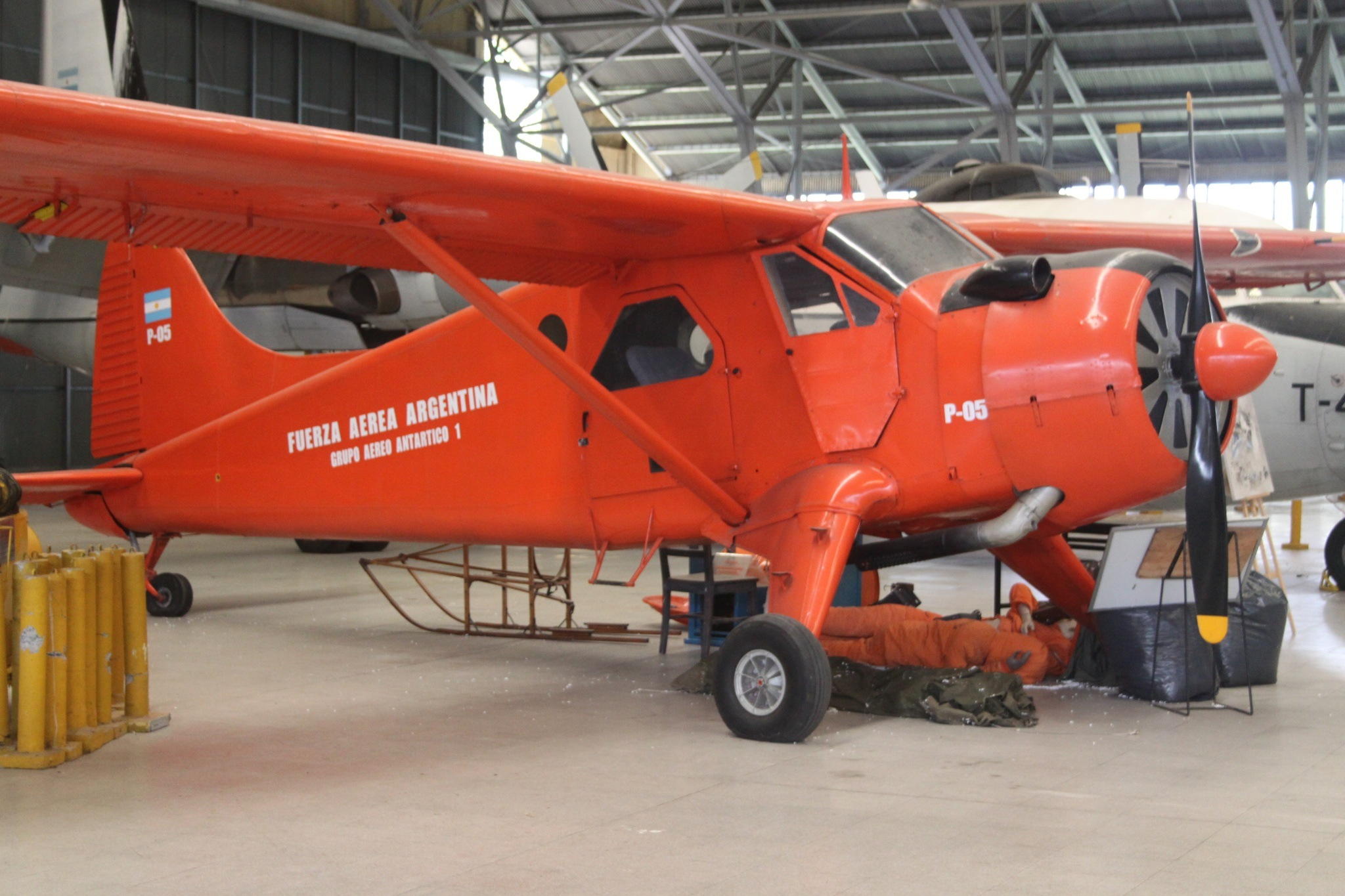
DHC-2 Beaver

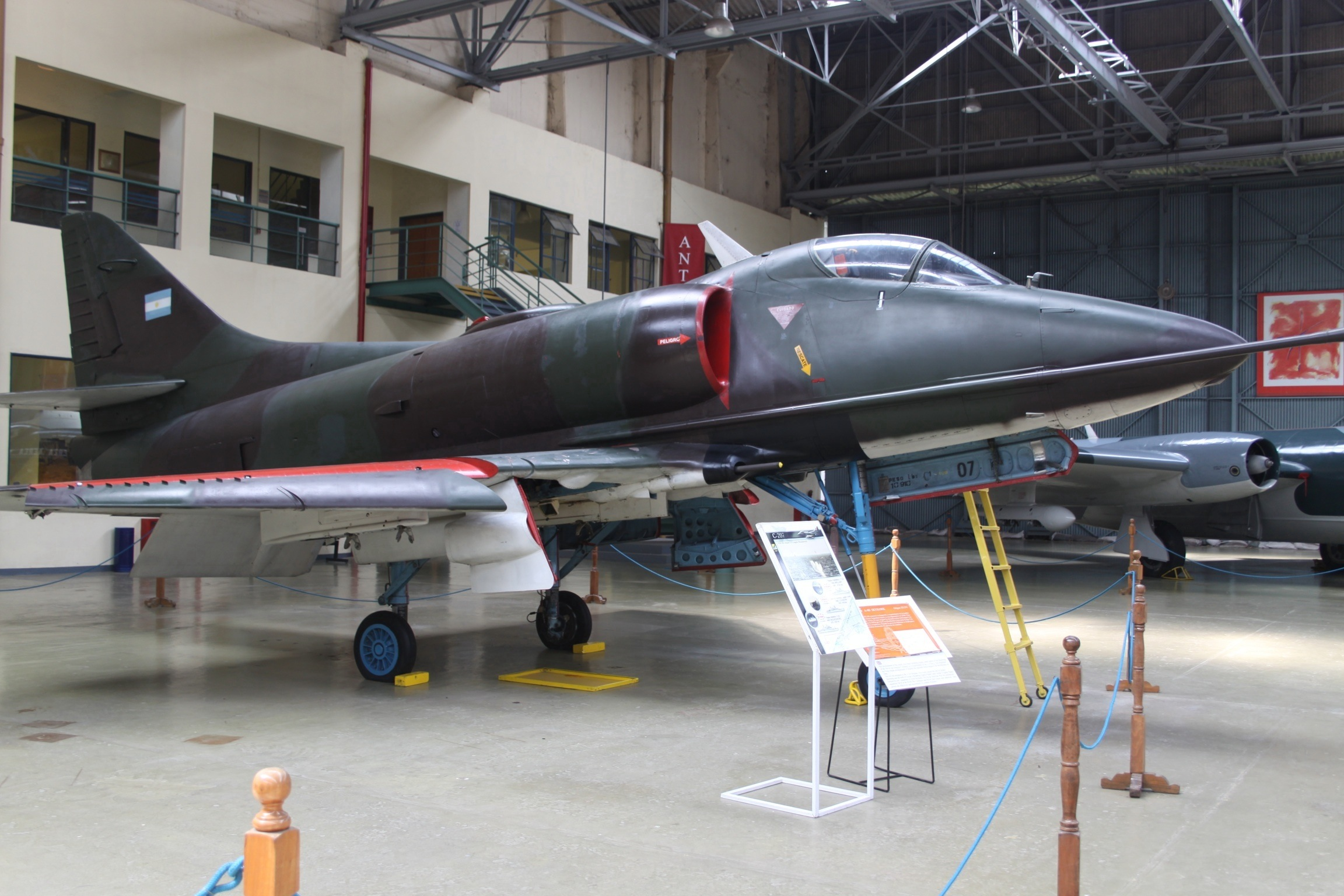
Douglas A-4P Skyhawk C-207

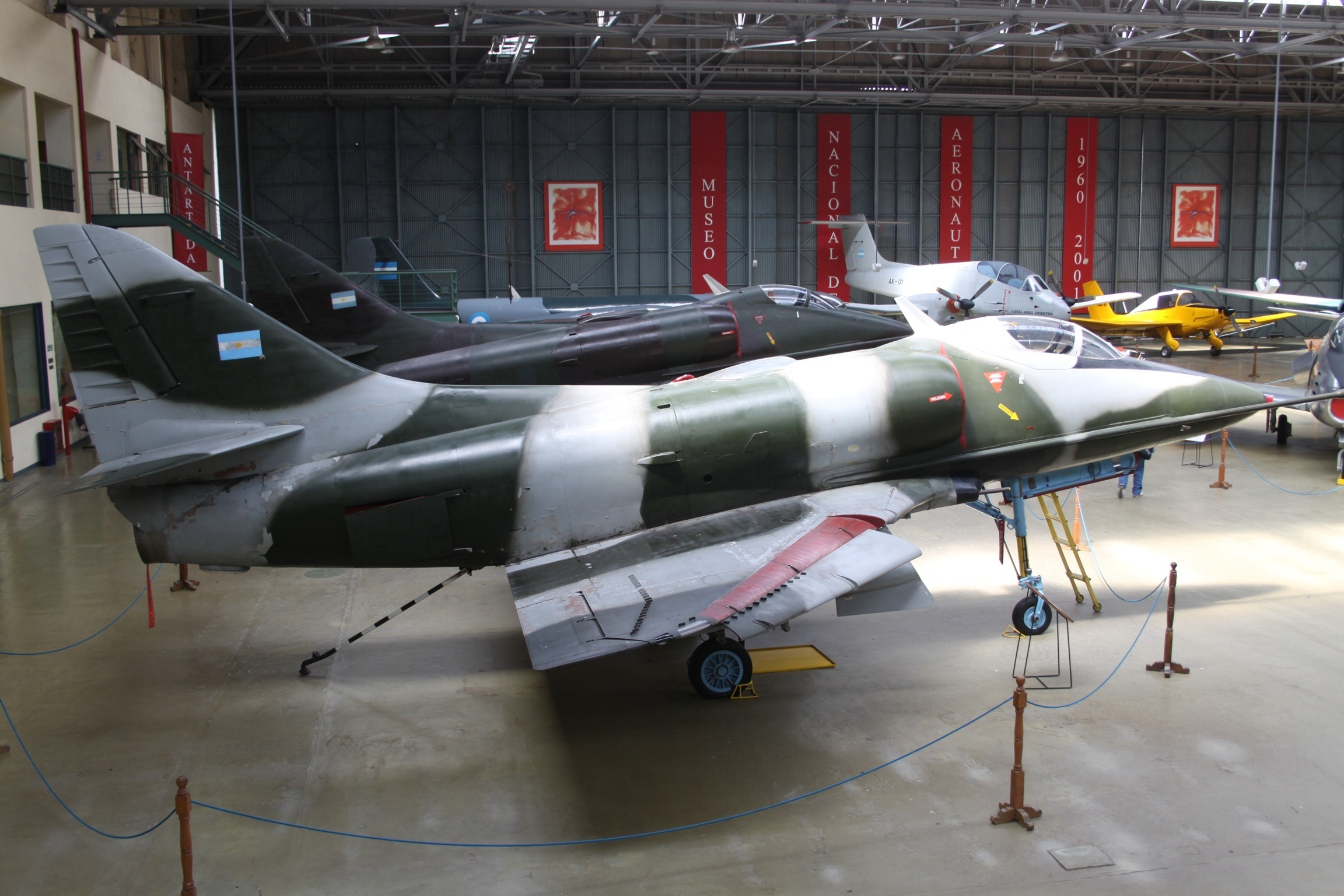
Douglas A-4C Skyhawk C-322

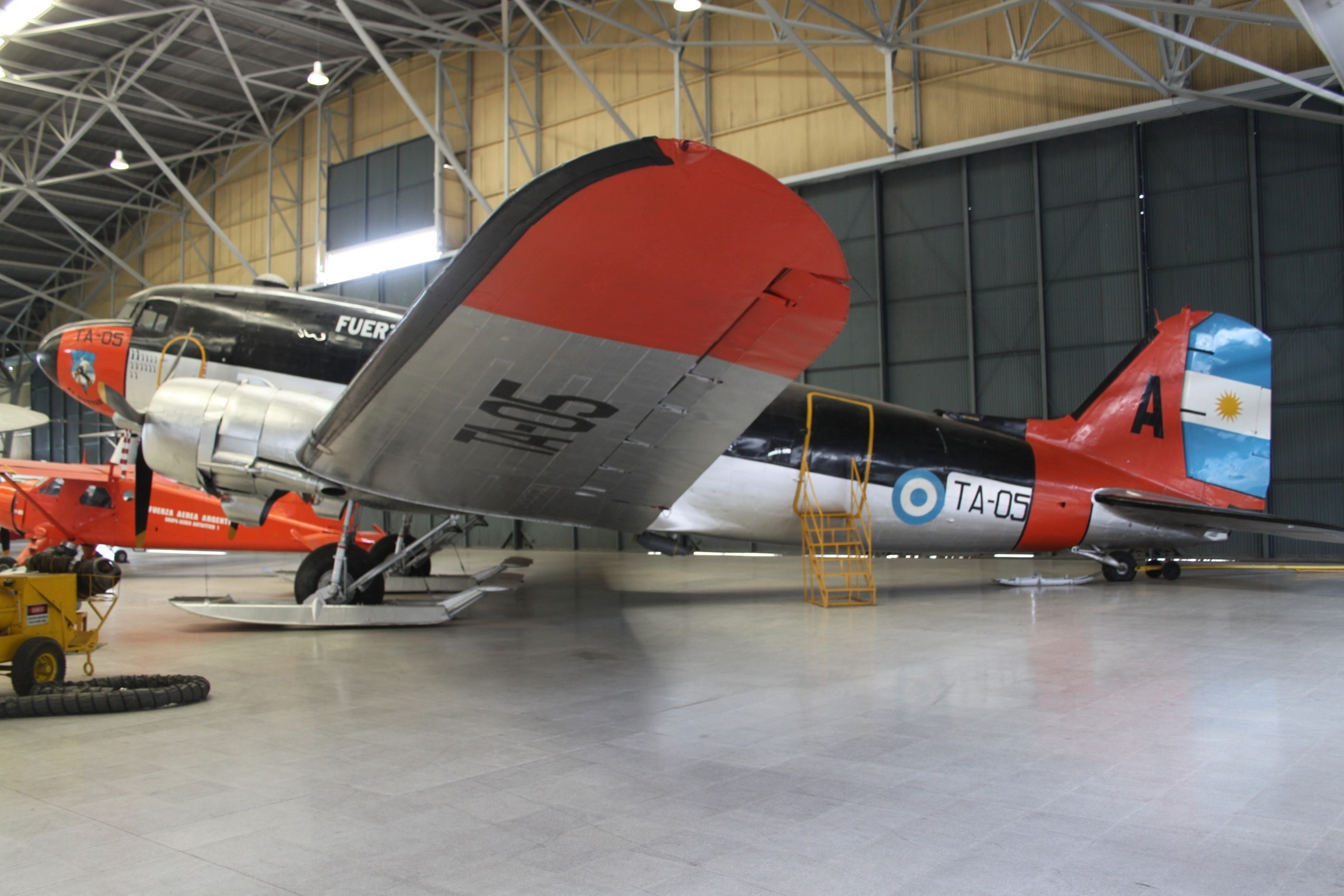
Douglas DC-3 TA-05

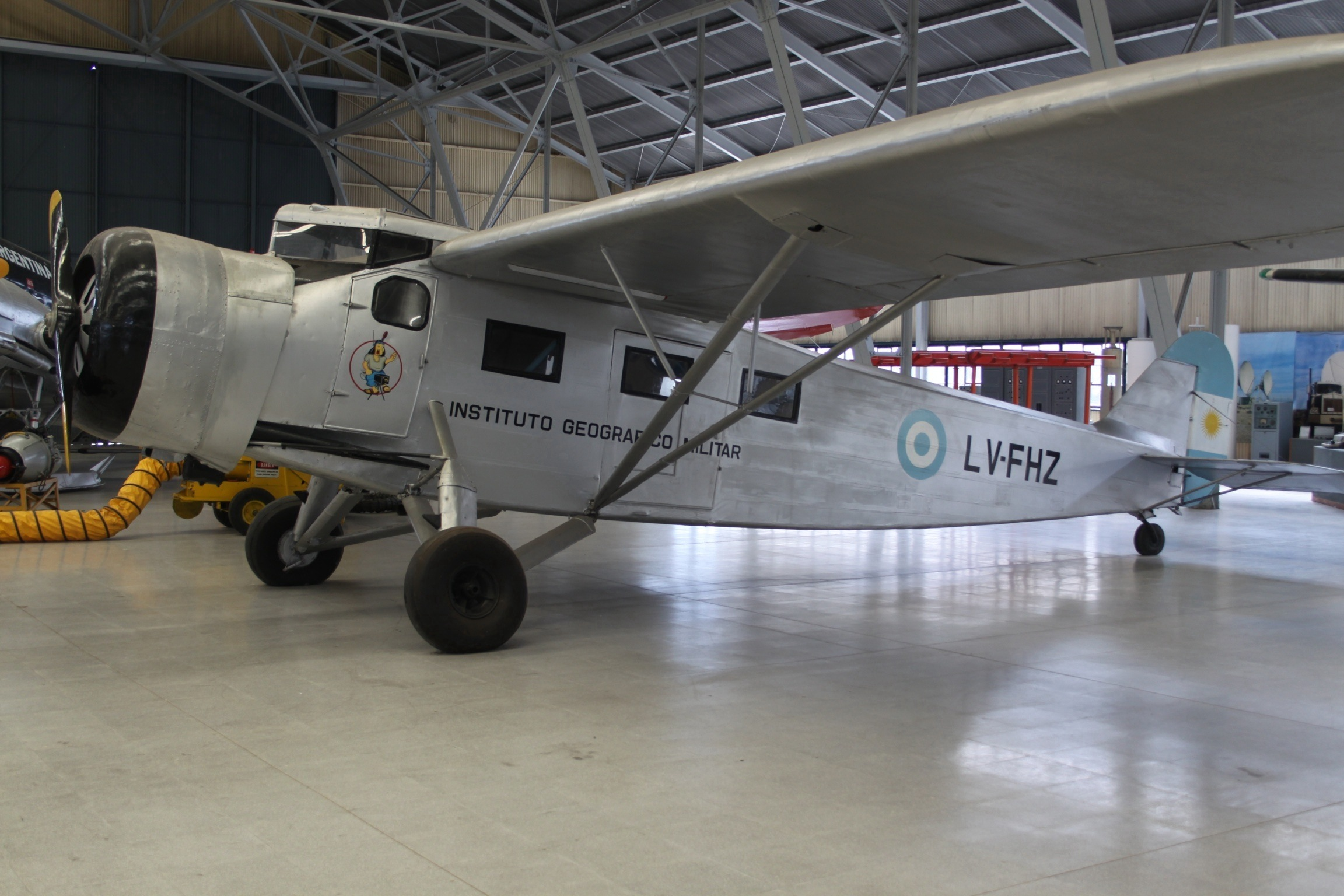
Fairchild 82D LV-FHZ

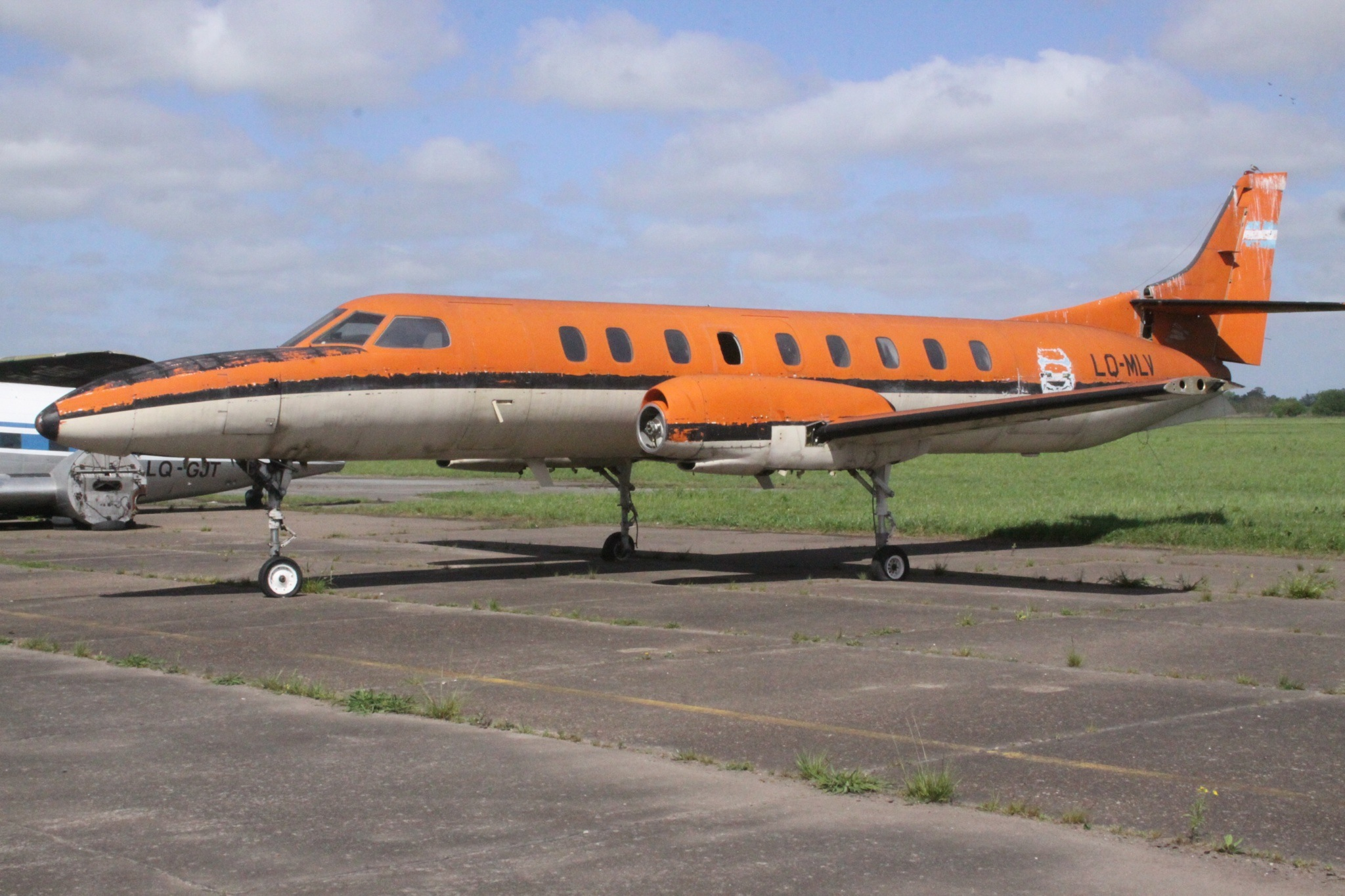
Swearingen Metro LQ-MLV

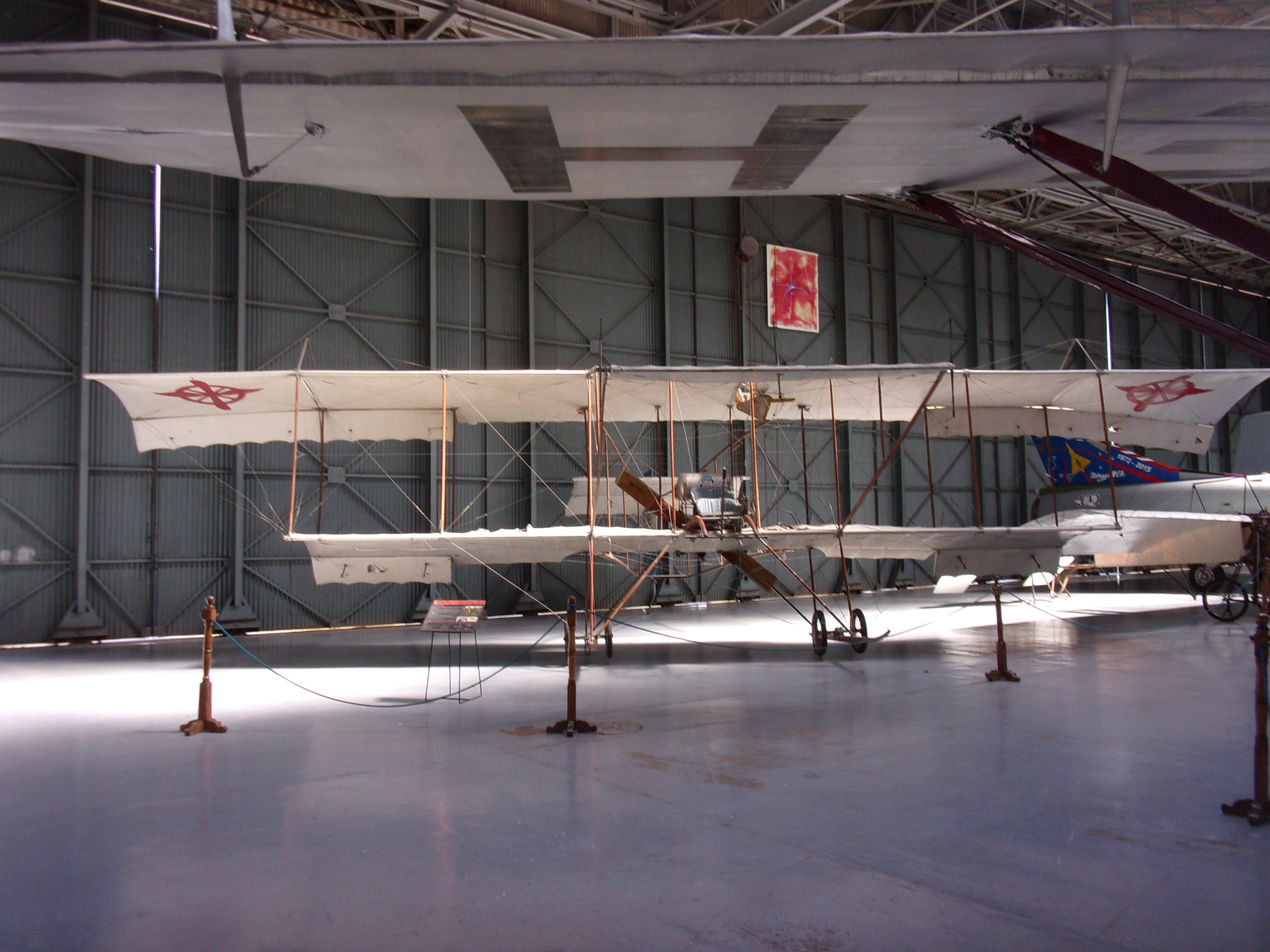
Farman replica

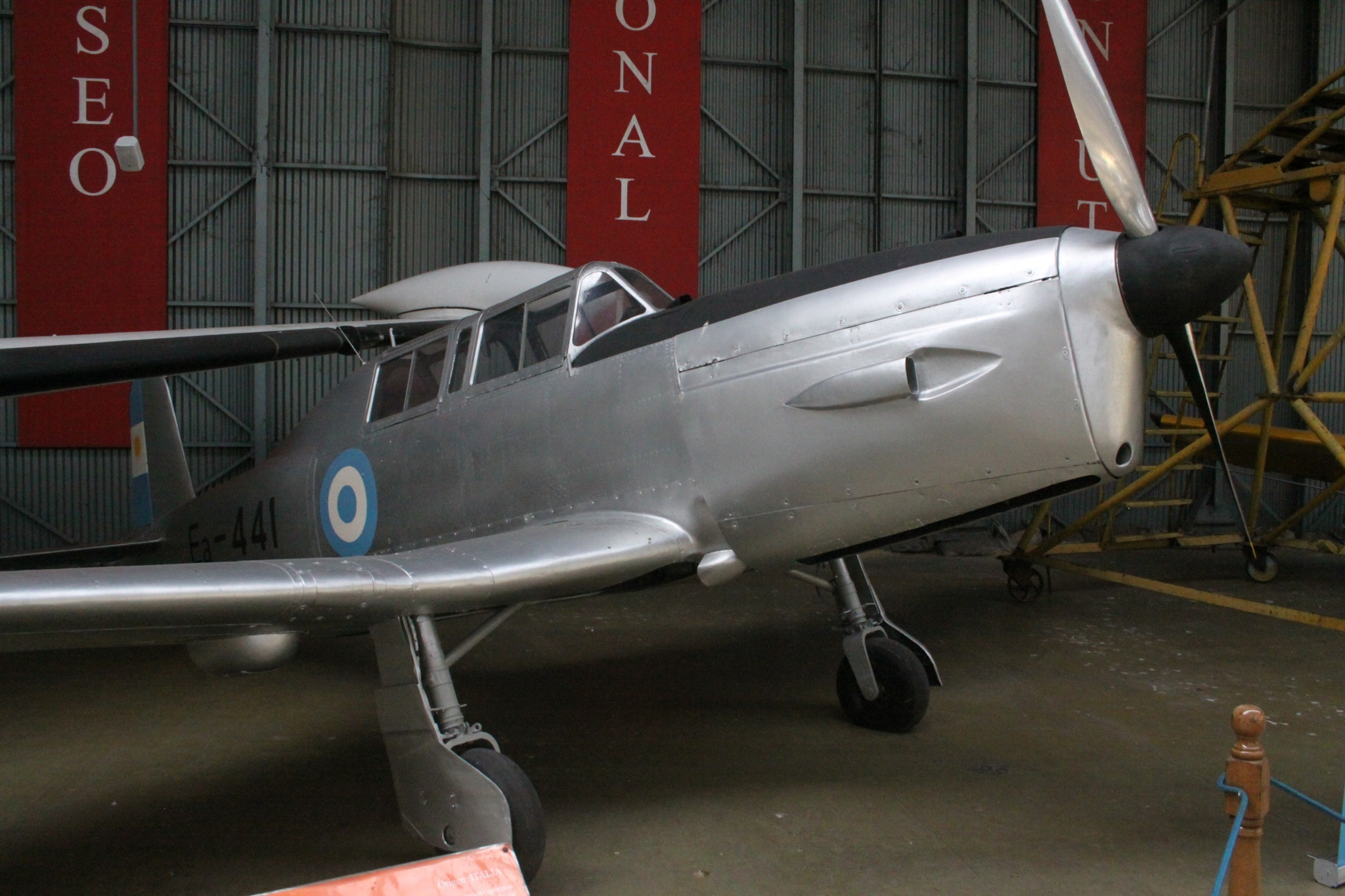
Fiat G-46-5B

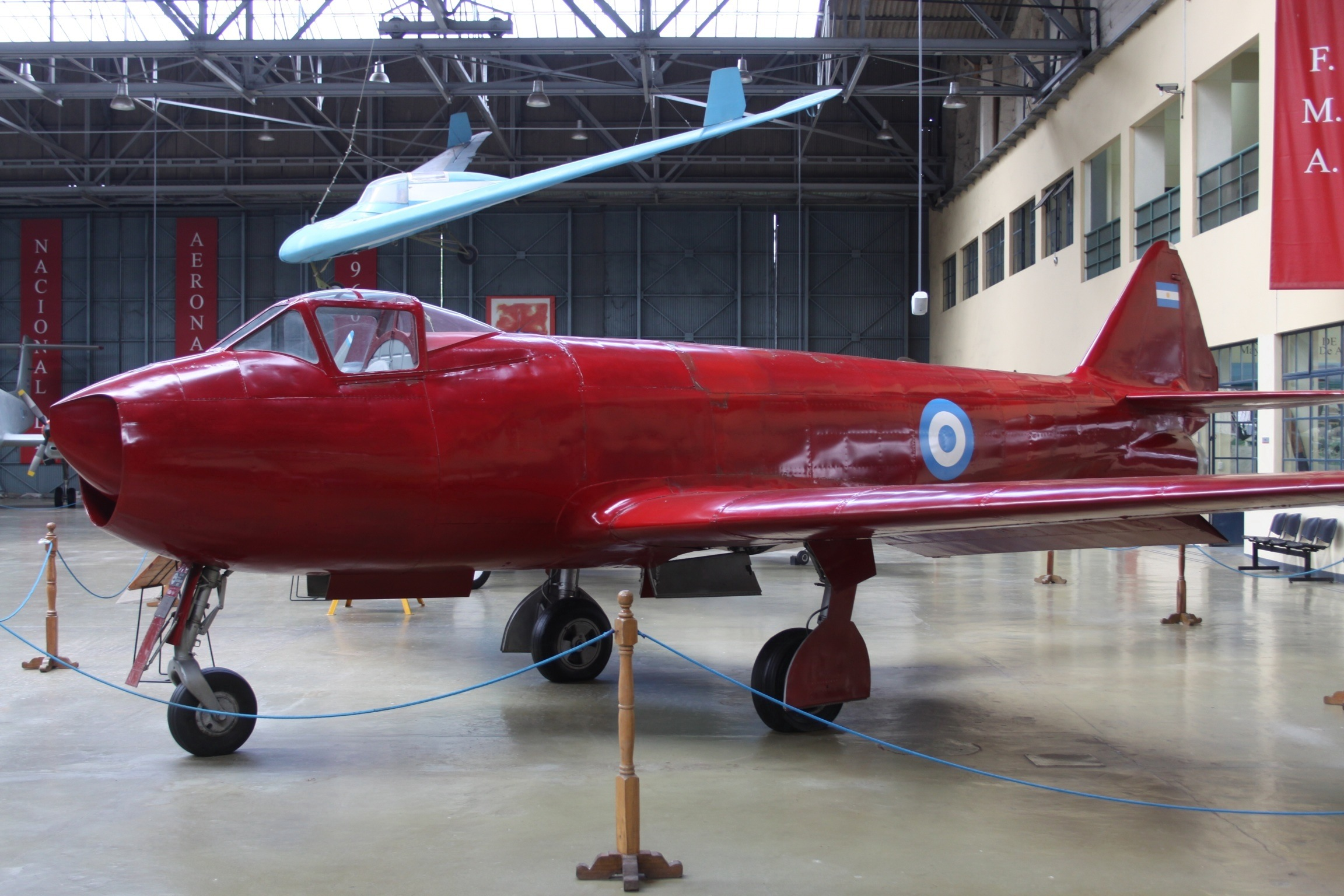
FMA I.Ae. 27 Pulqui I prototype

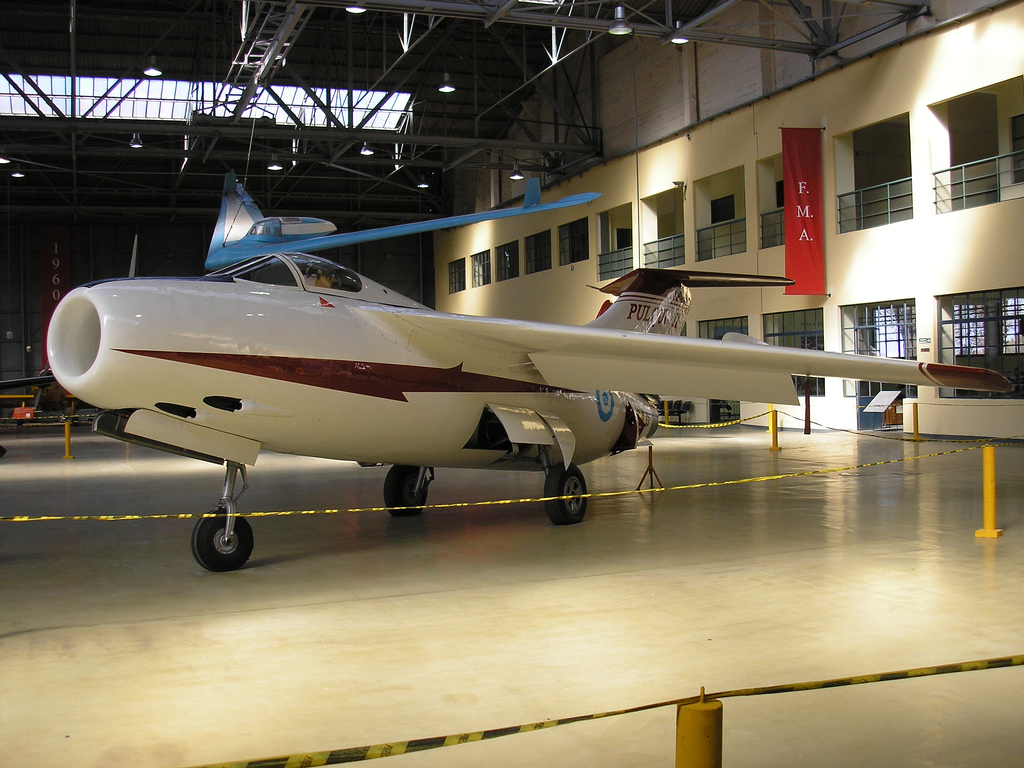
FMA IAe 33 Pulqui II prototype 5

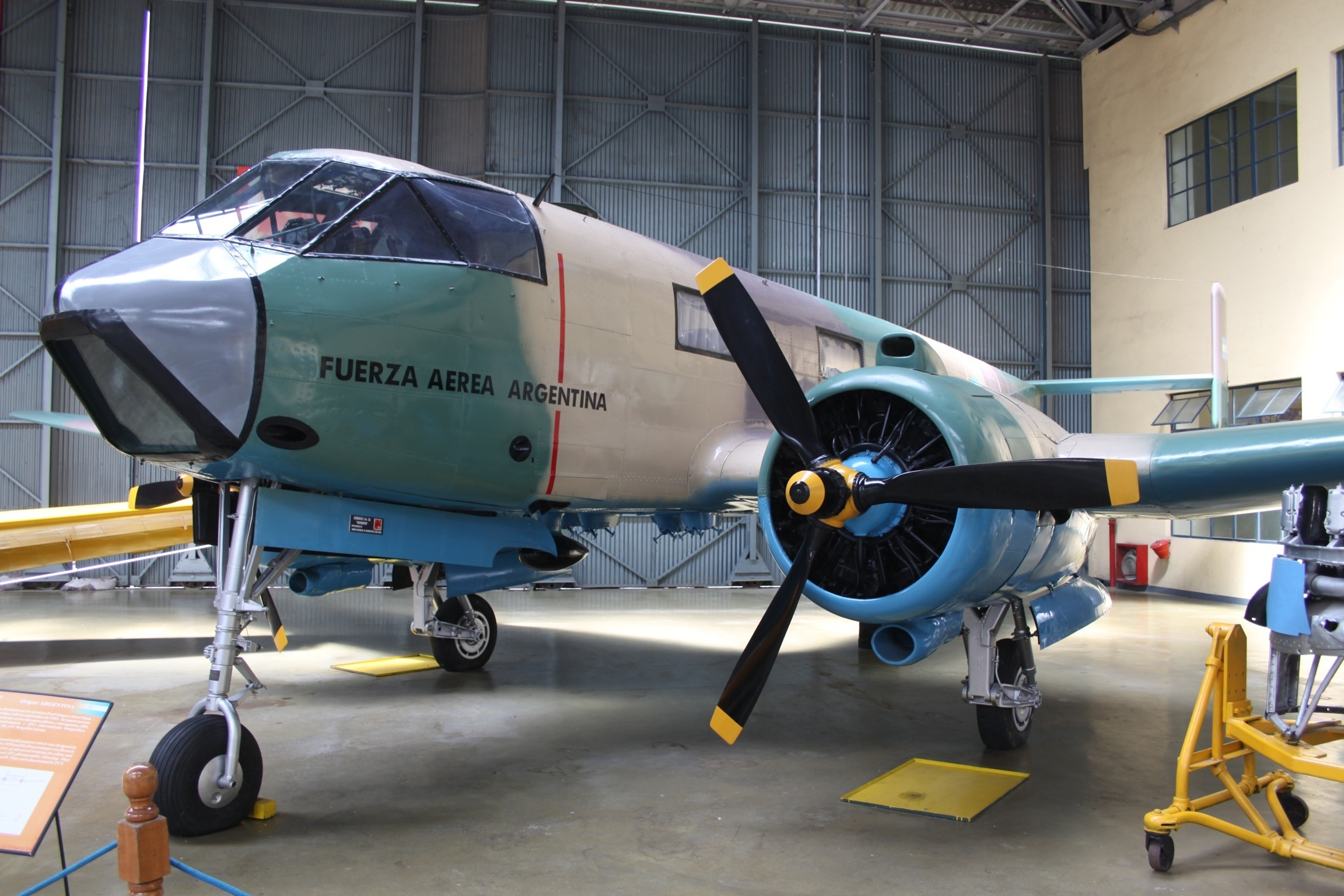
FMA IA 35 Huanquero

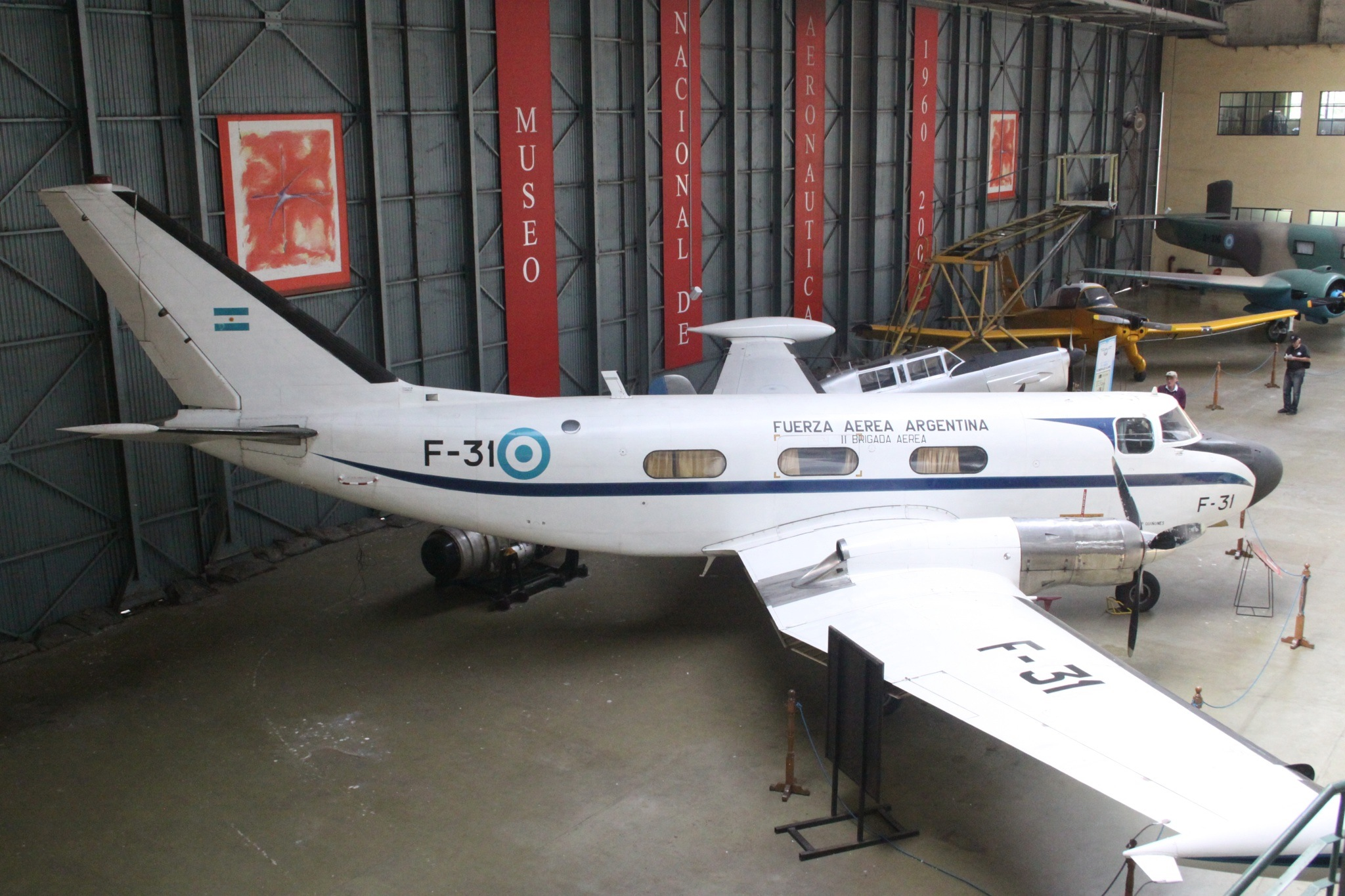
FMA IA 50 Guaraní II

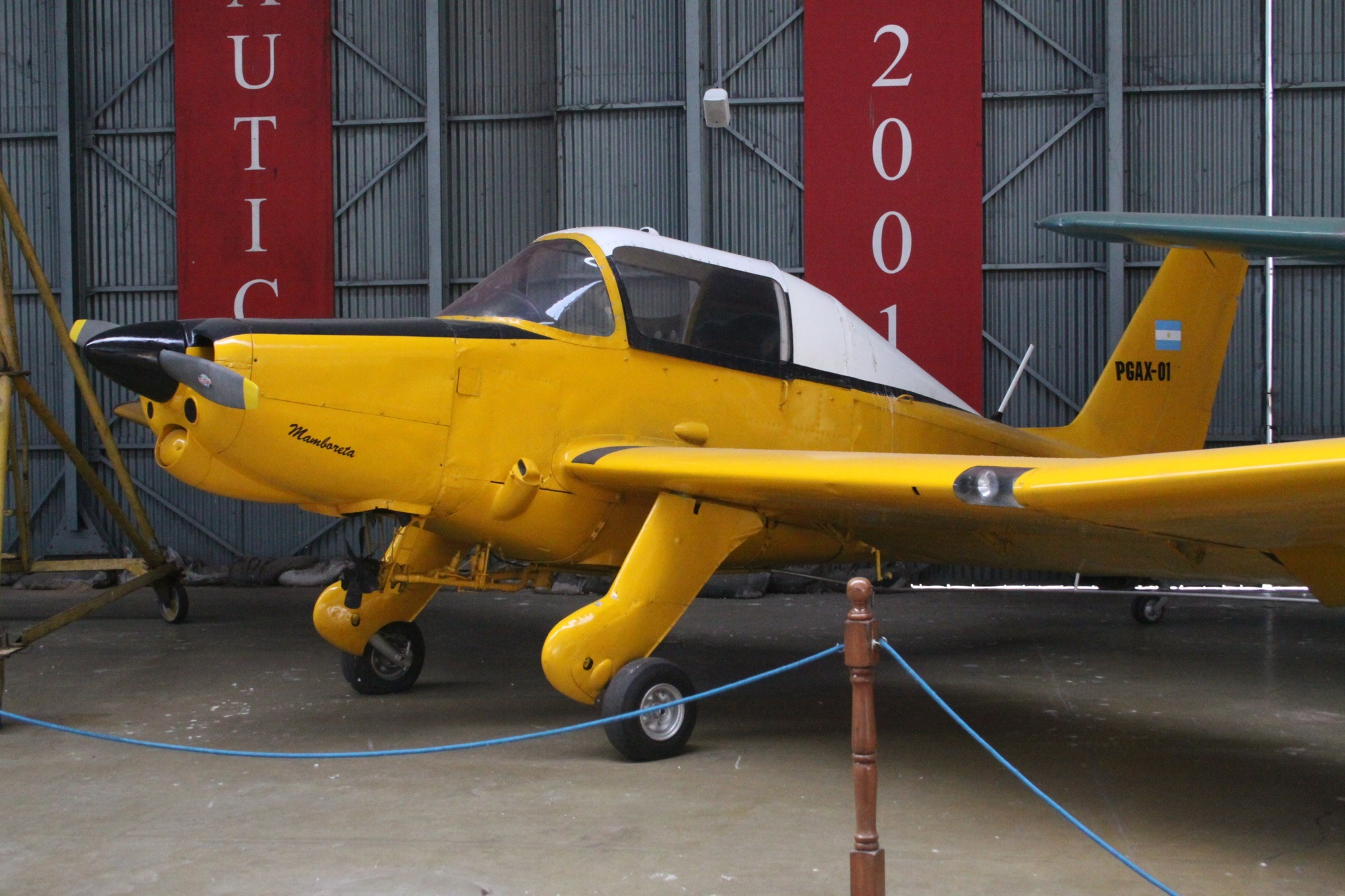
FMA IA 53 Mamboretá

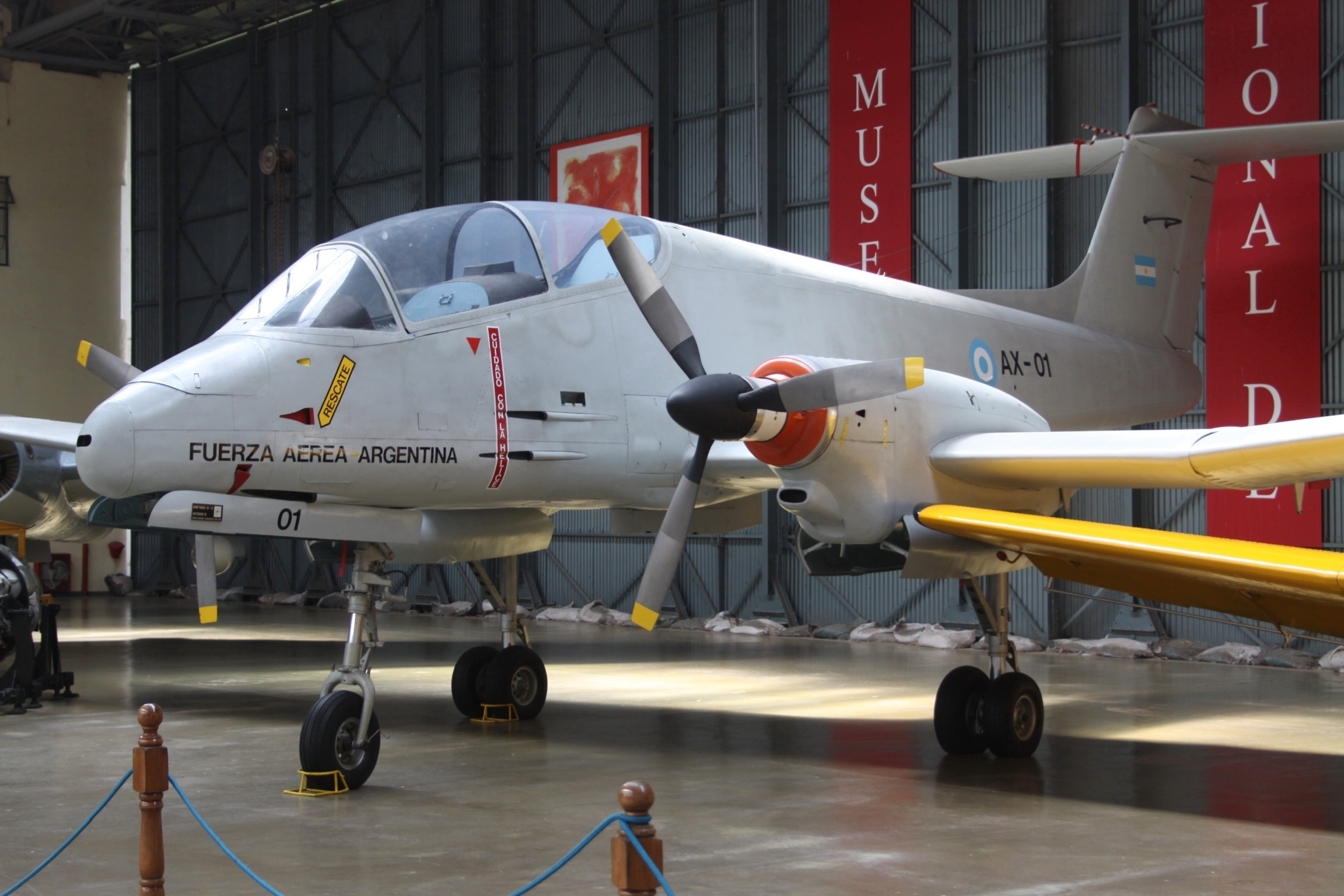
FMA IA 58 Pucará prototype AX-01

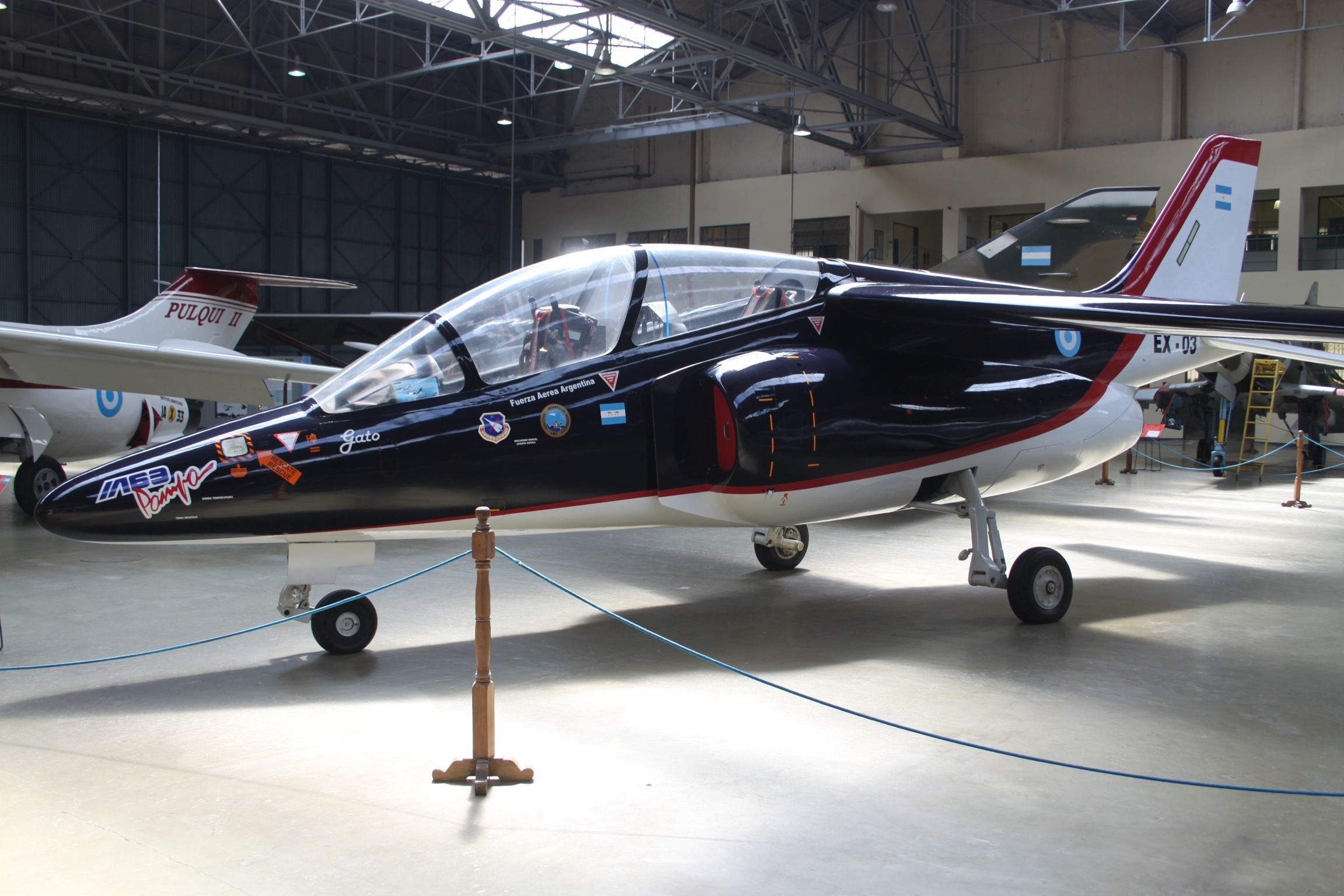
FMA IA63 Pampa prototype EX-03

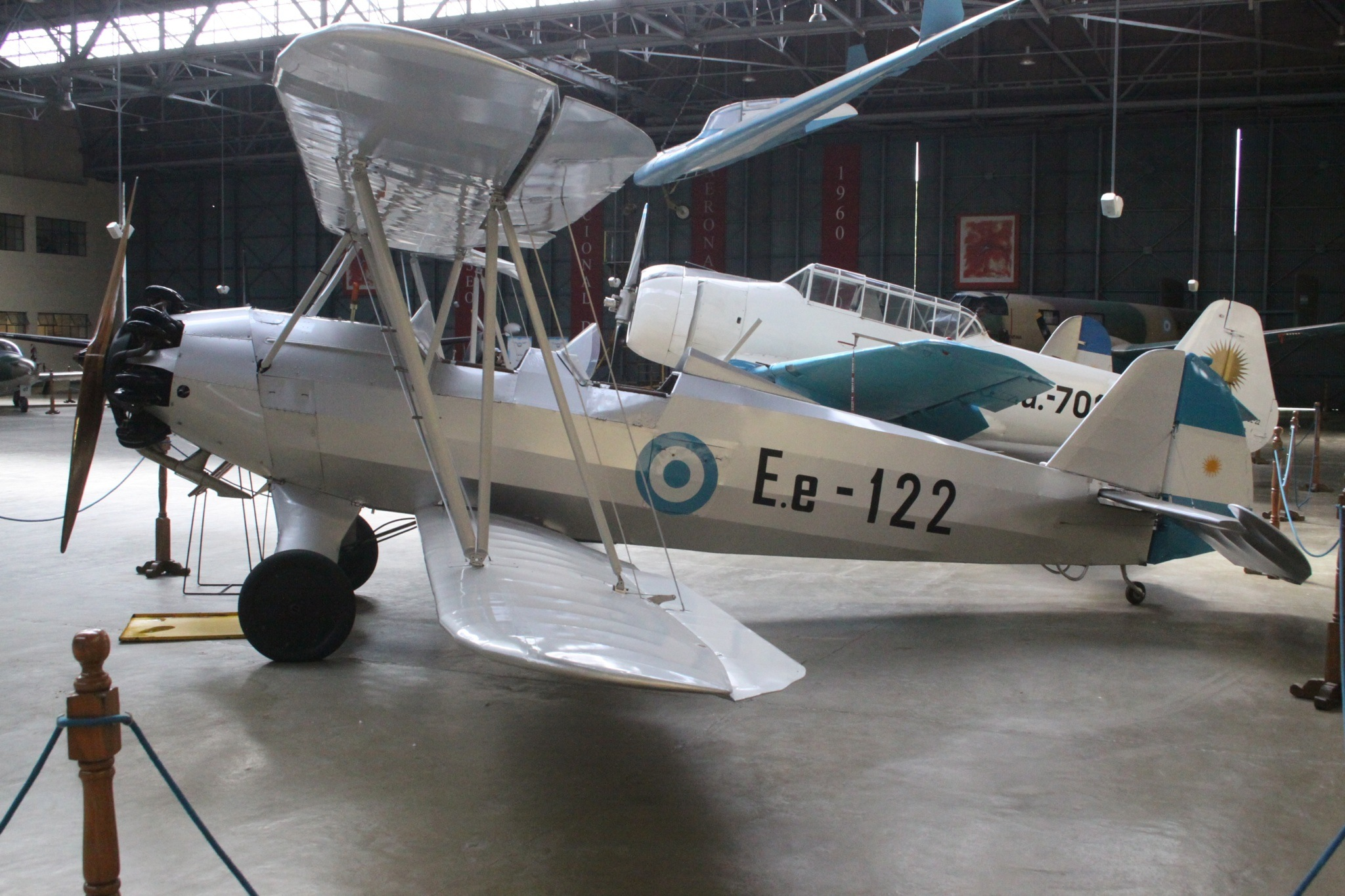
Focke Wulf FW-44J Stieglitz

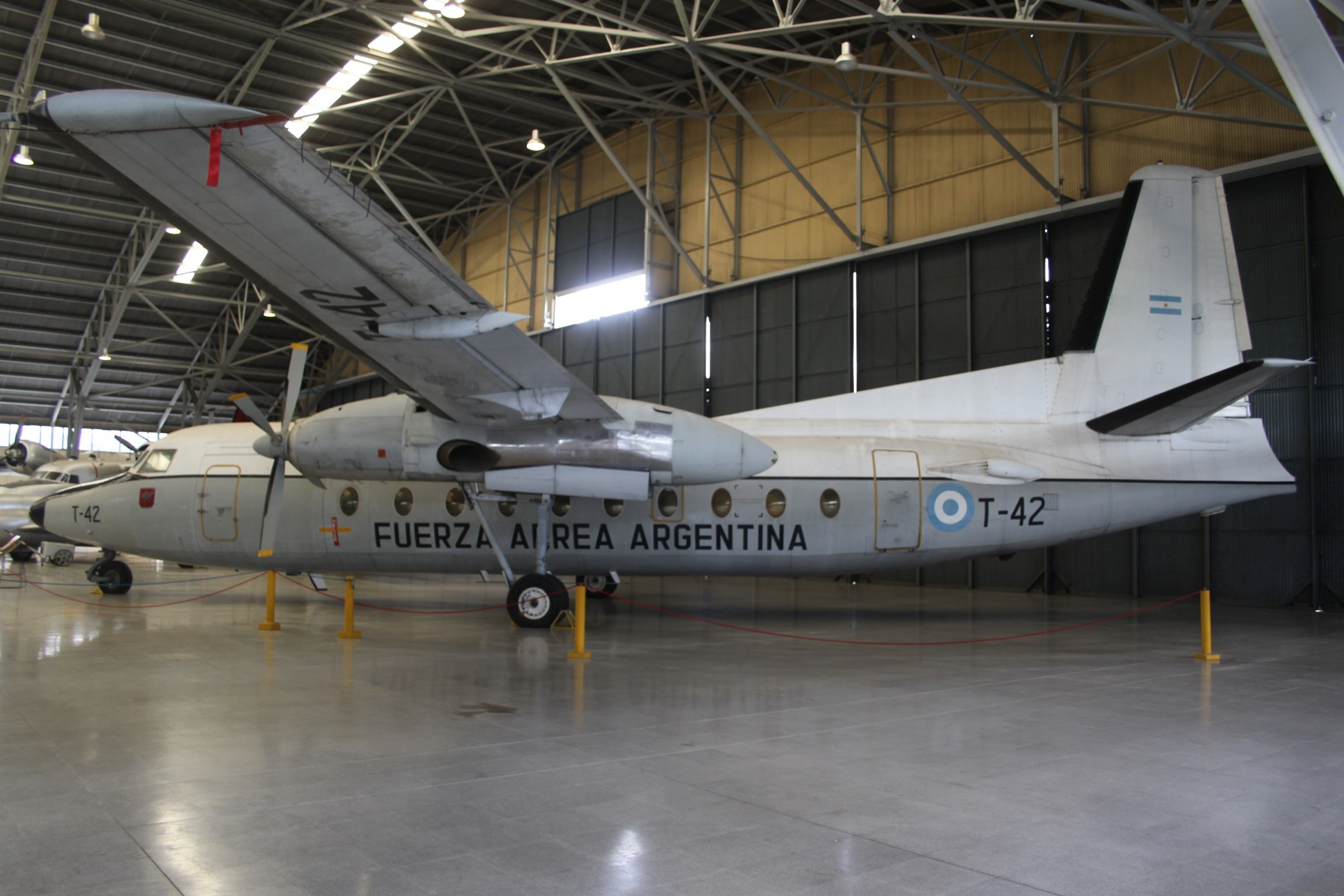
Fokker F.27 T-42

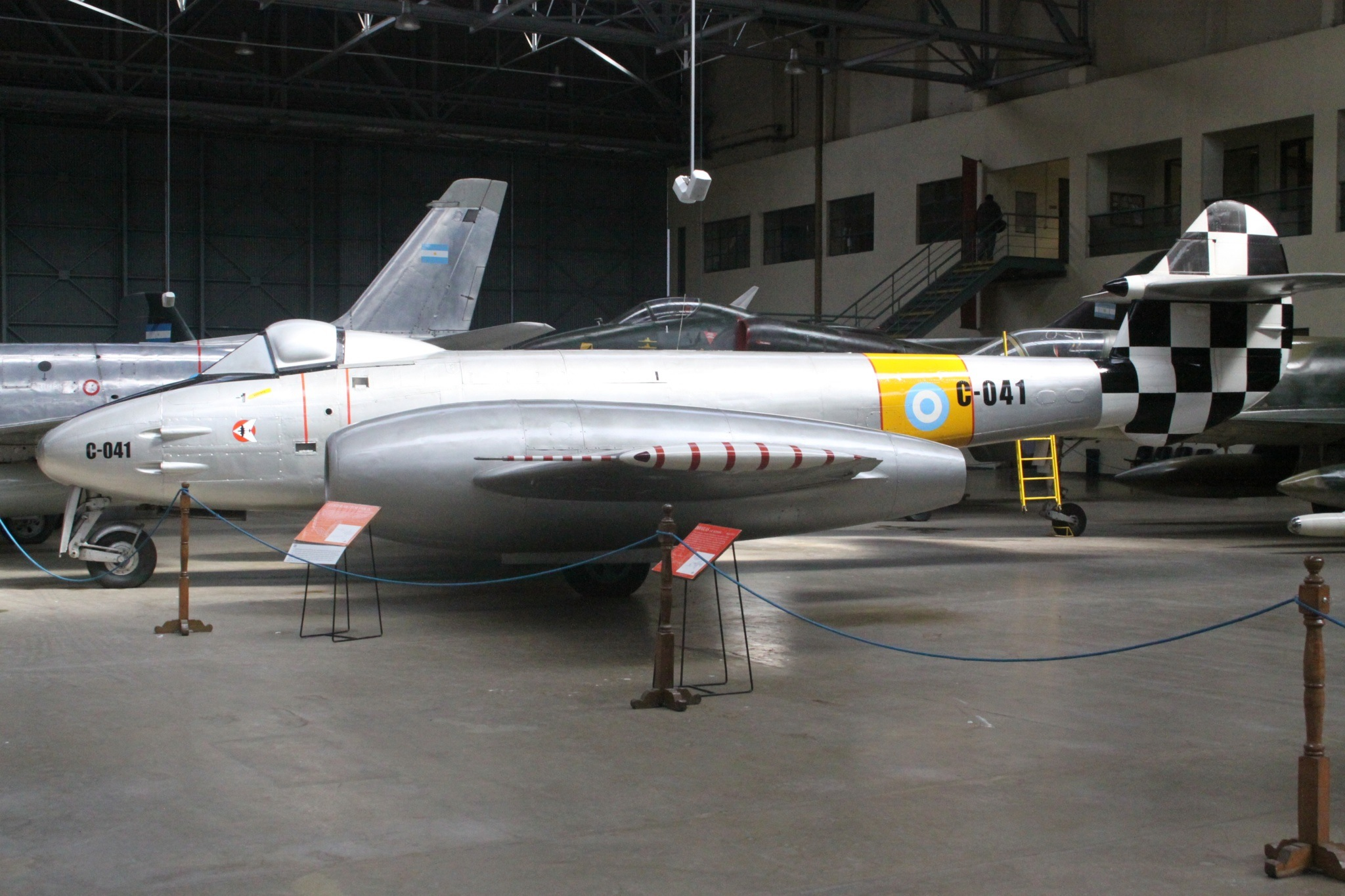
Gloster Meteor F.4

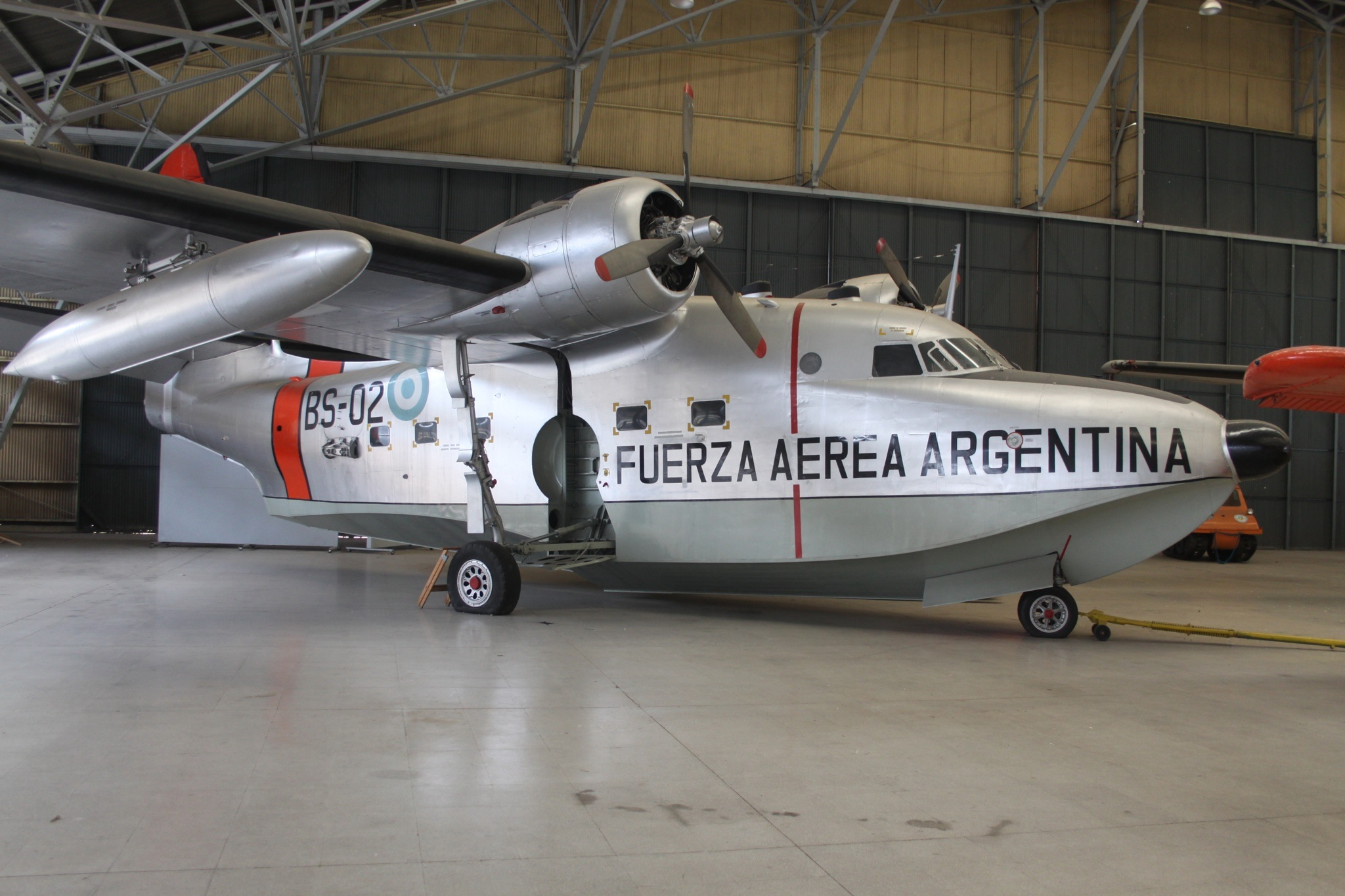
Grumman Albatross

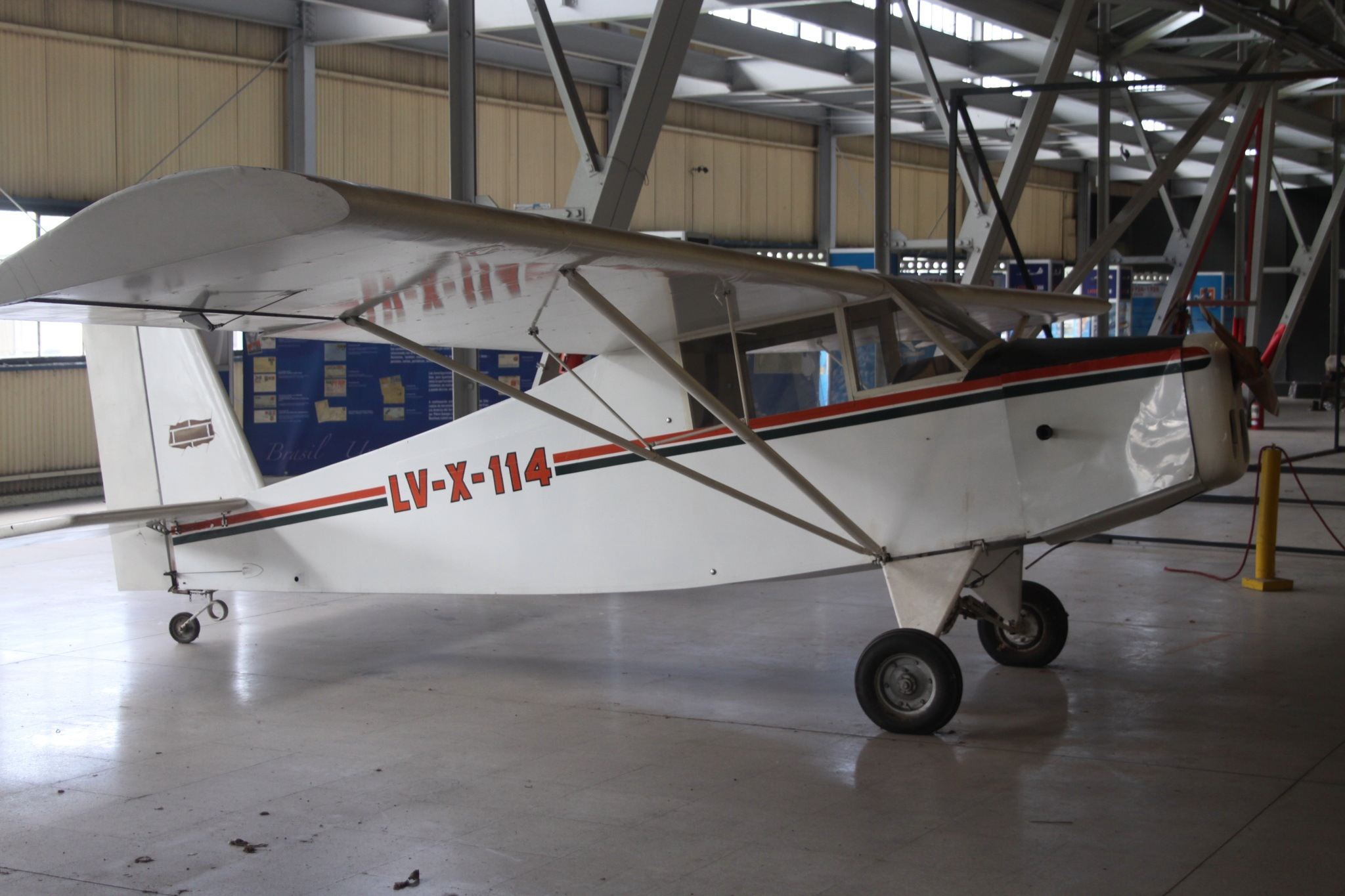
Iriarte Ladrillo (experimental)

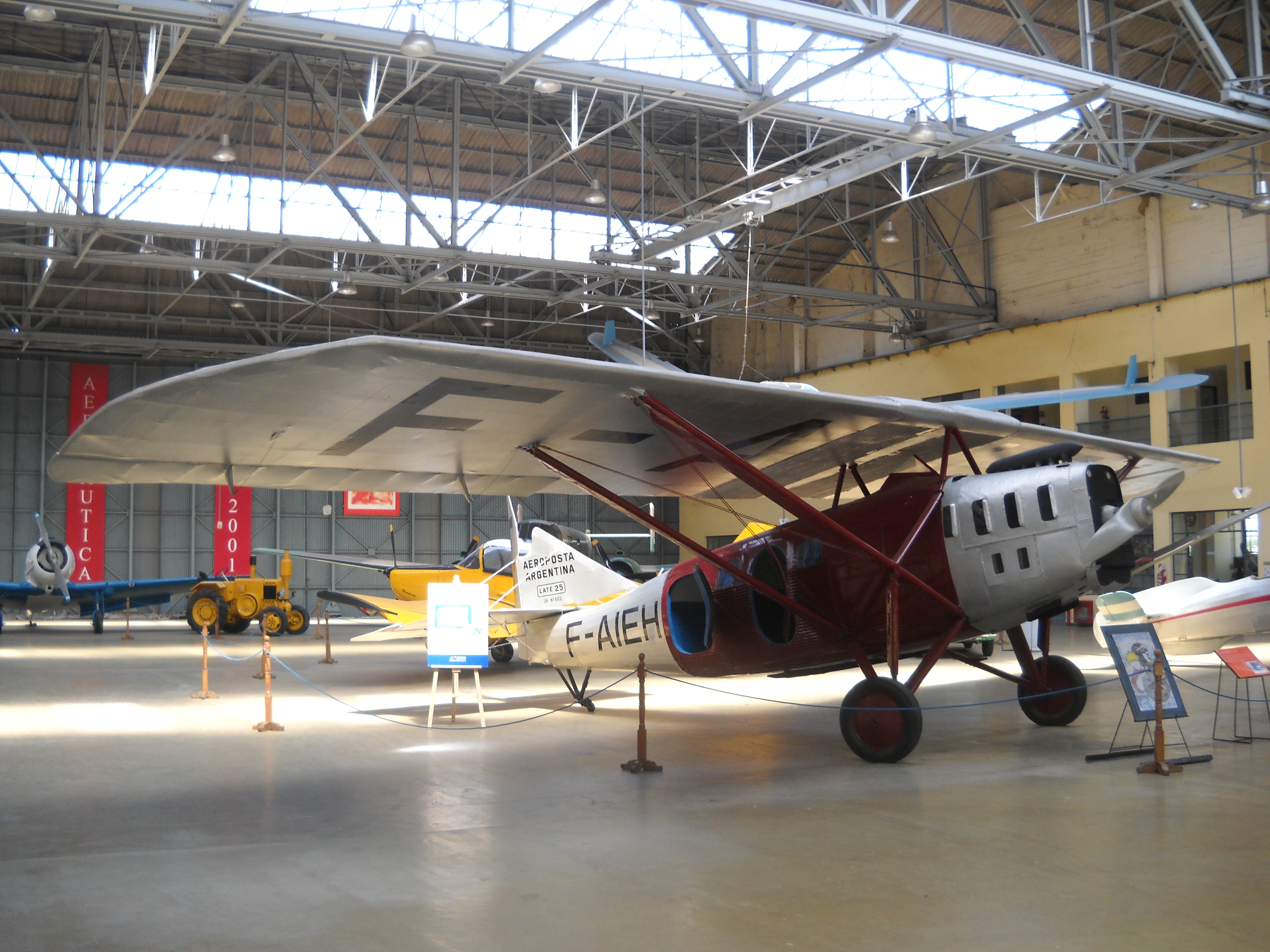
Latécoère 25

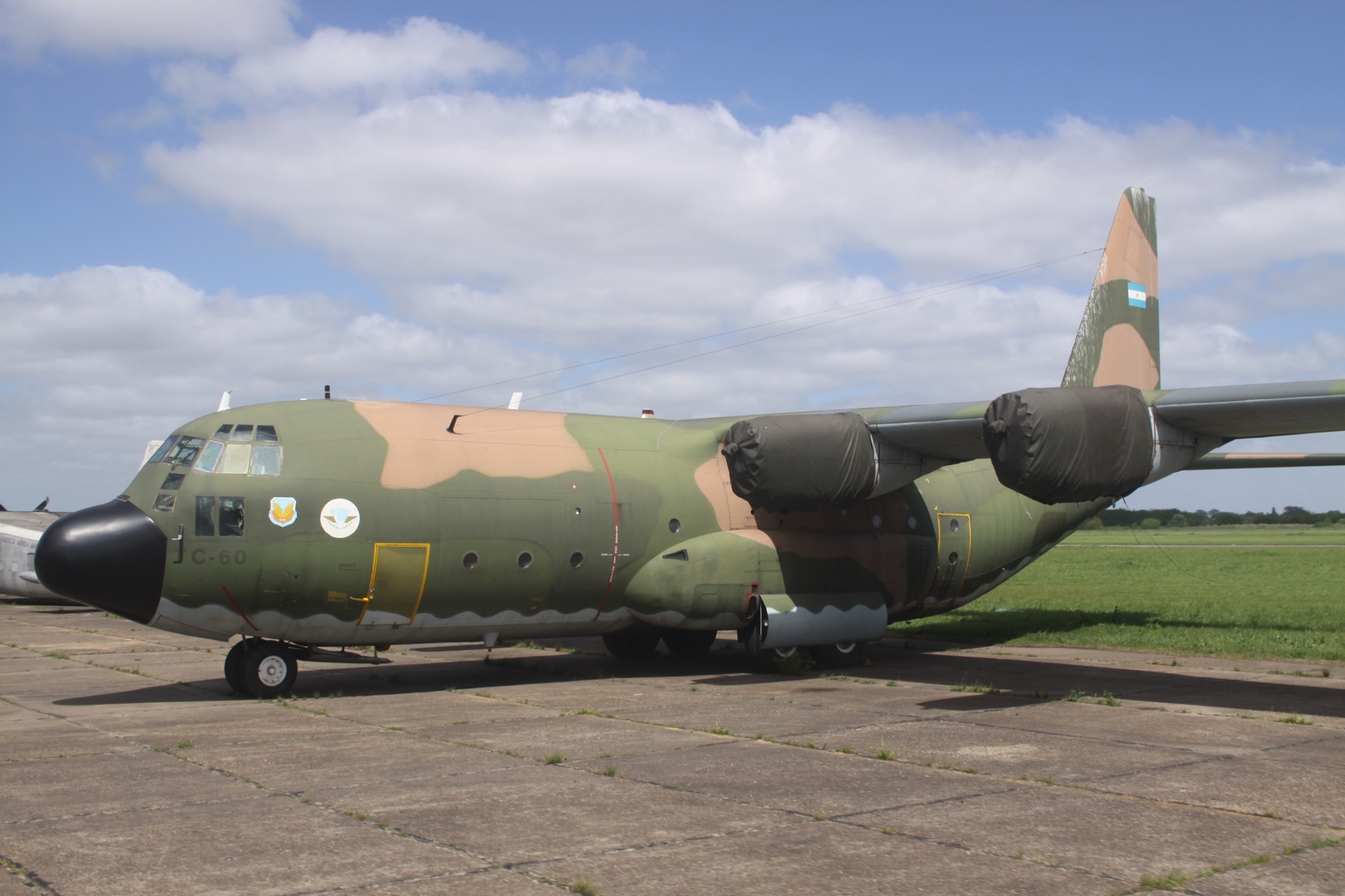
Lockheed Hercules C-130B TC-60

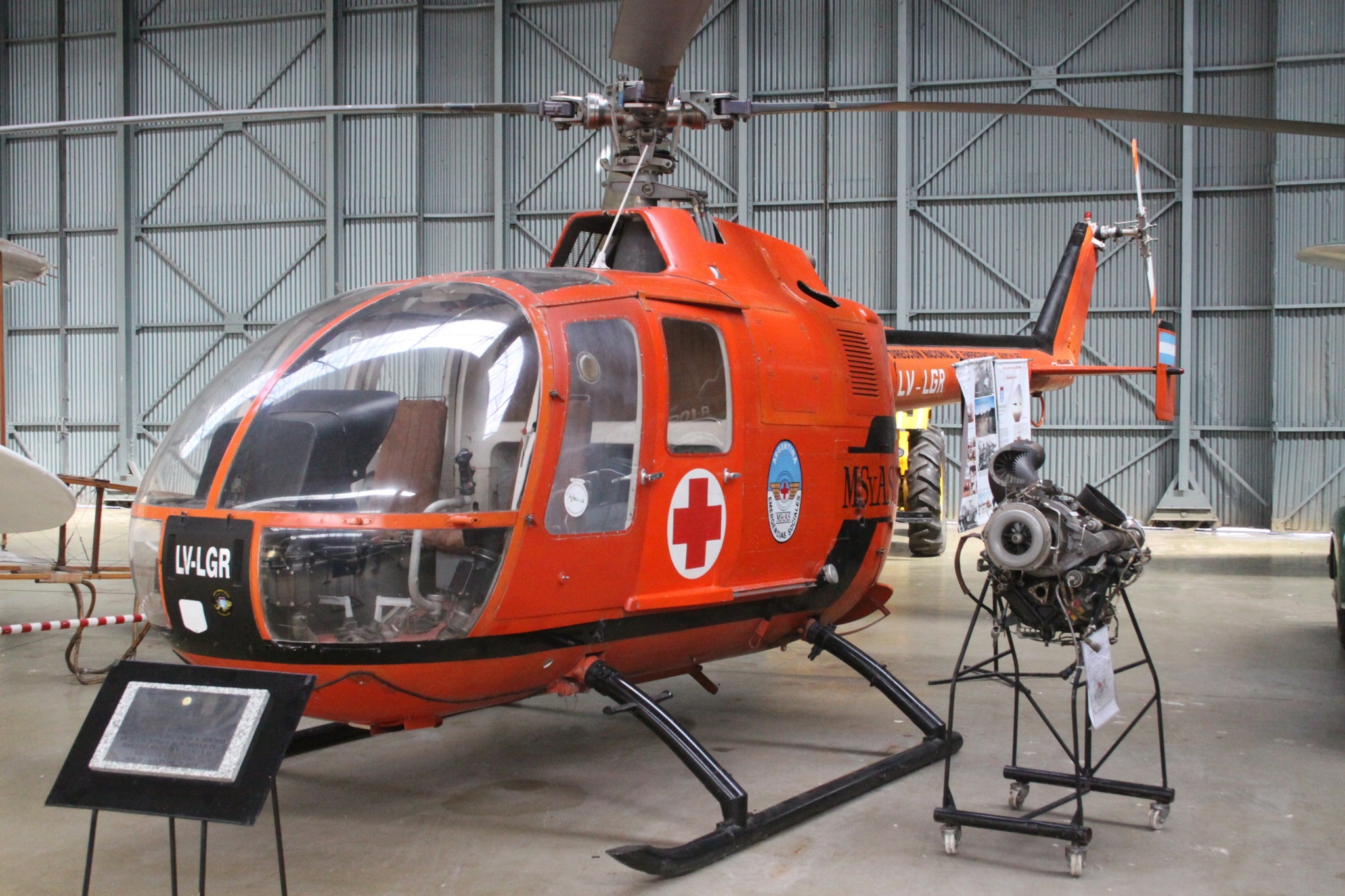
MBB Bo.105C

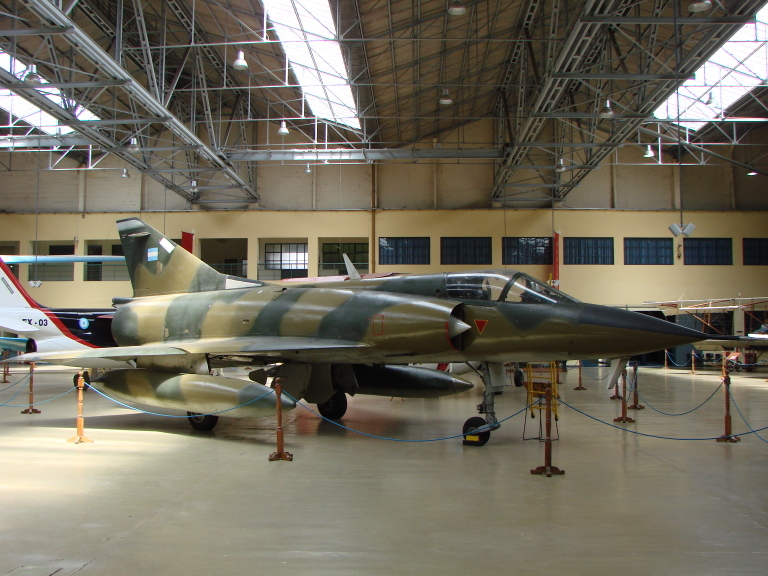
Mirage IIIC

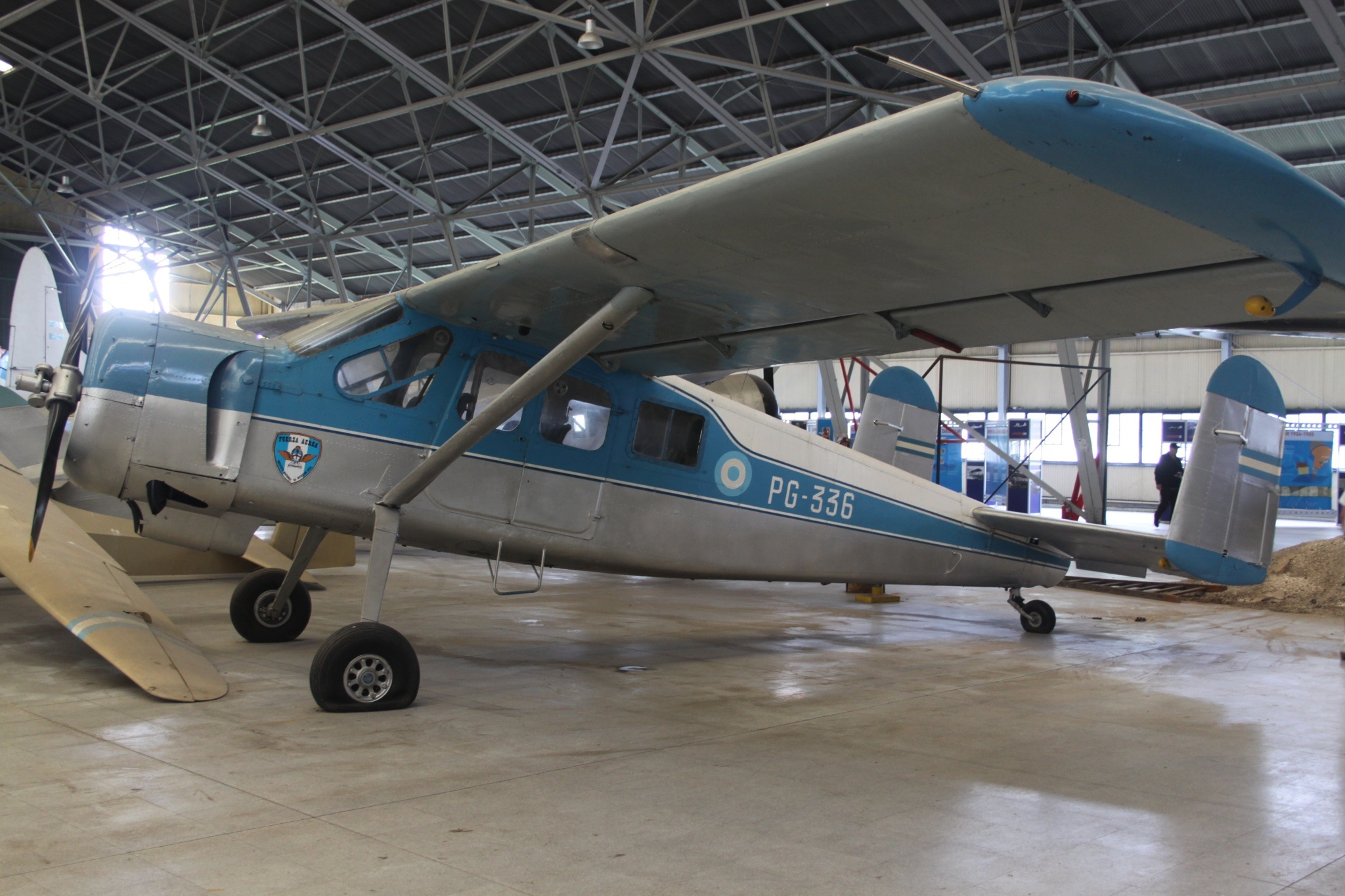
Max Holste 1521 Broussard

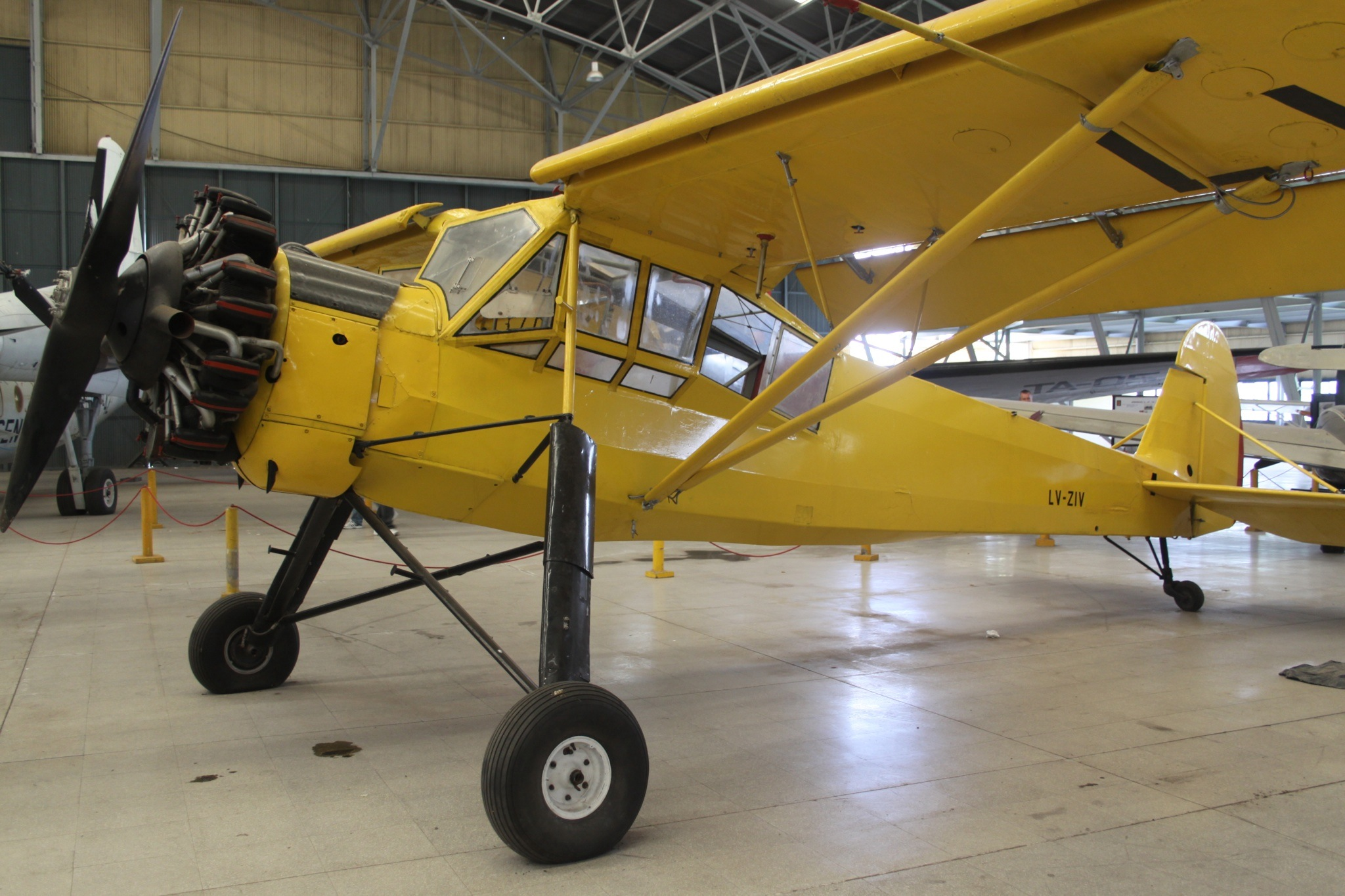
Morane-Saulnier MS.502 Criquet

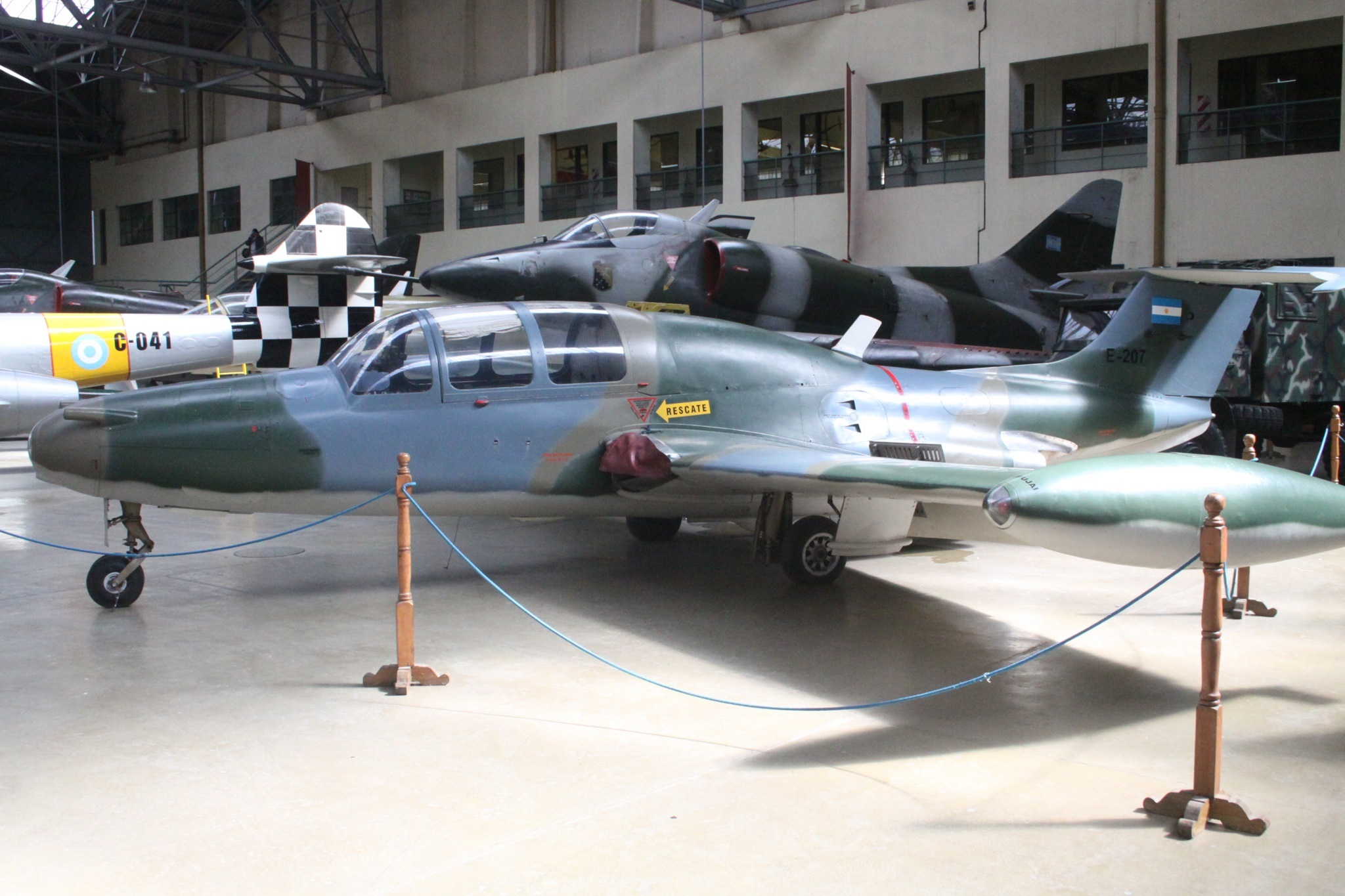
Morane-Saulnier Ms.760 Paris

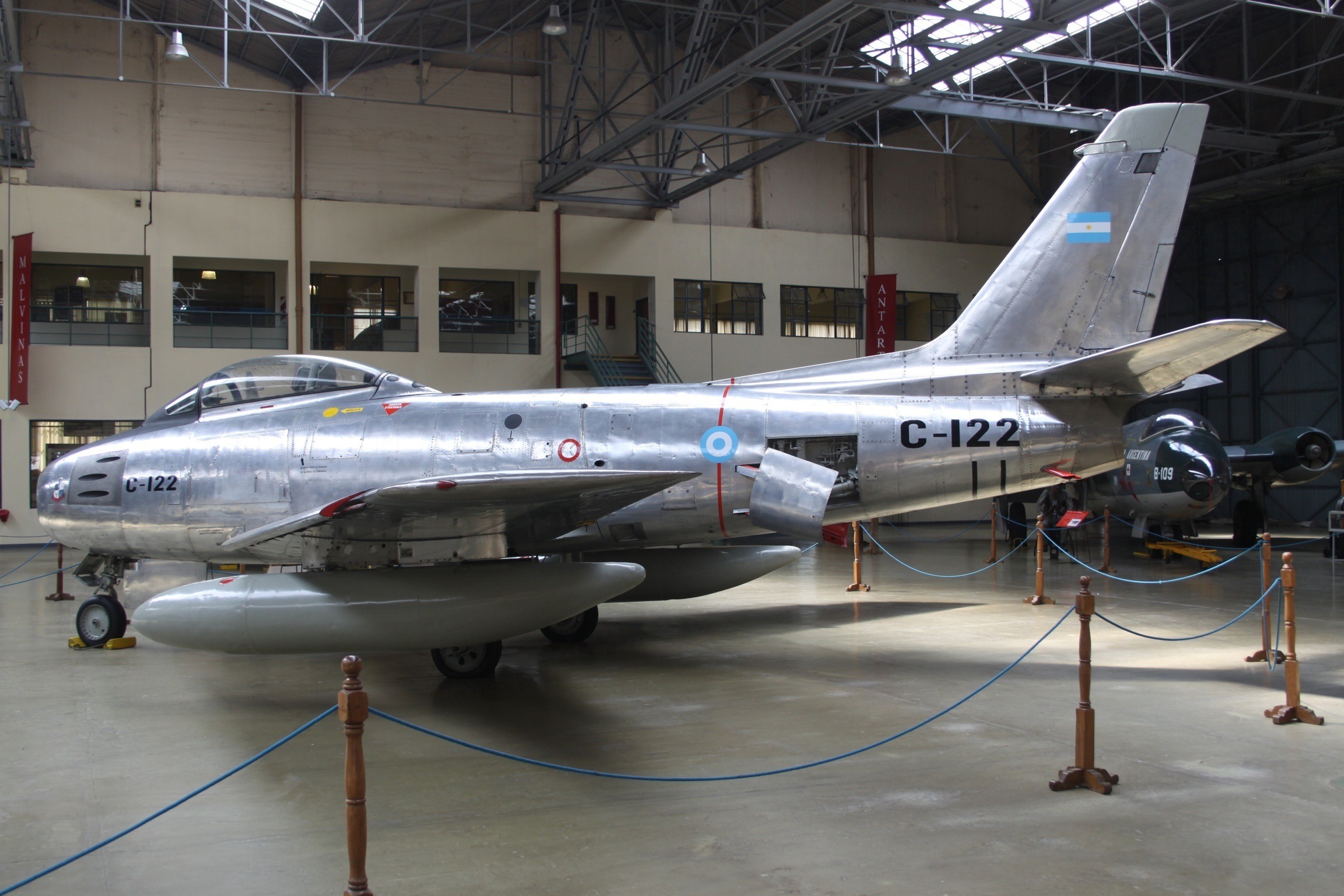
NA F-86 Sabre

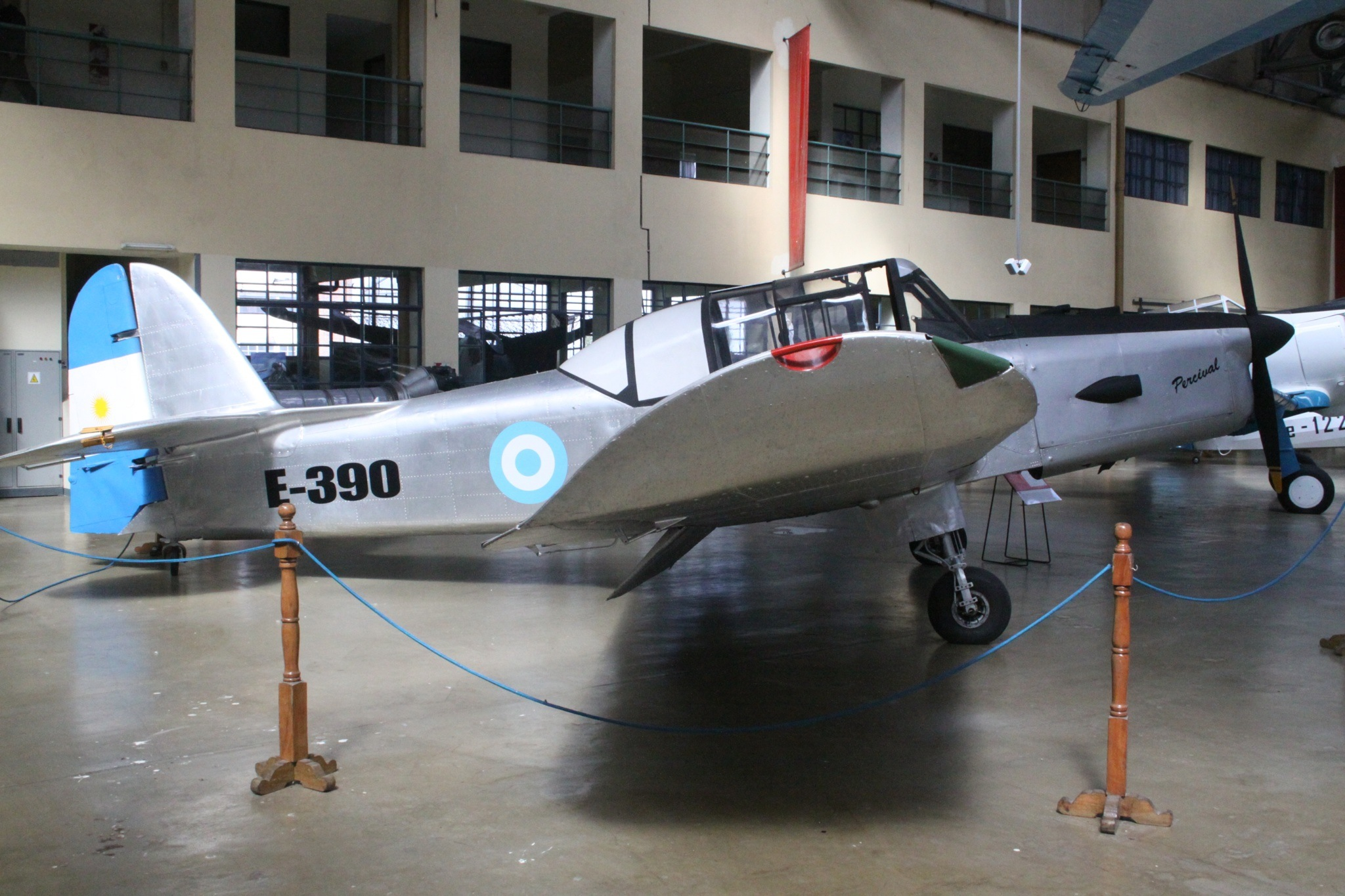
Percival Prentice T.1

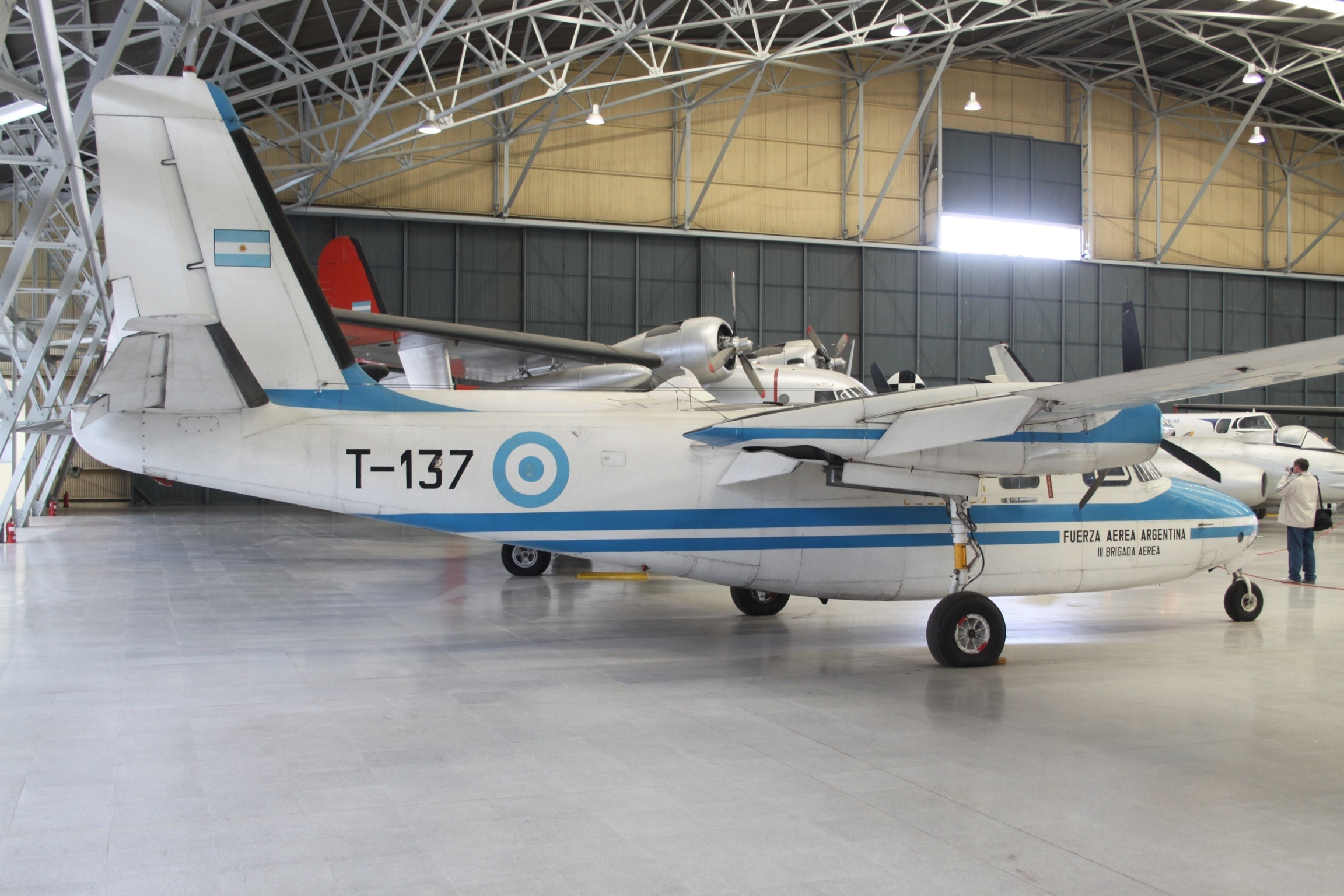
Rockwell Aero Commander 500

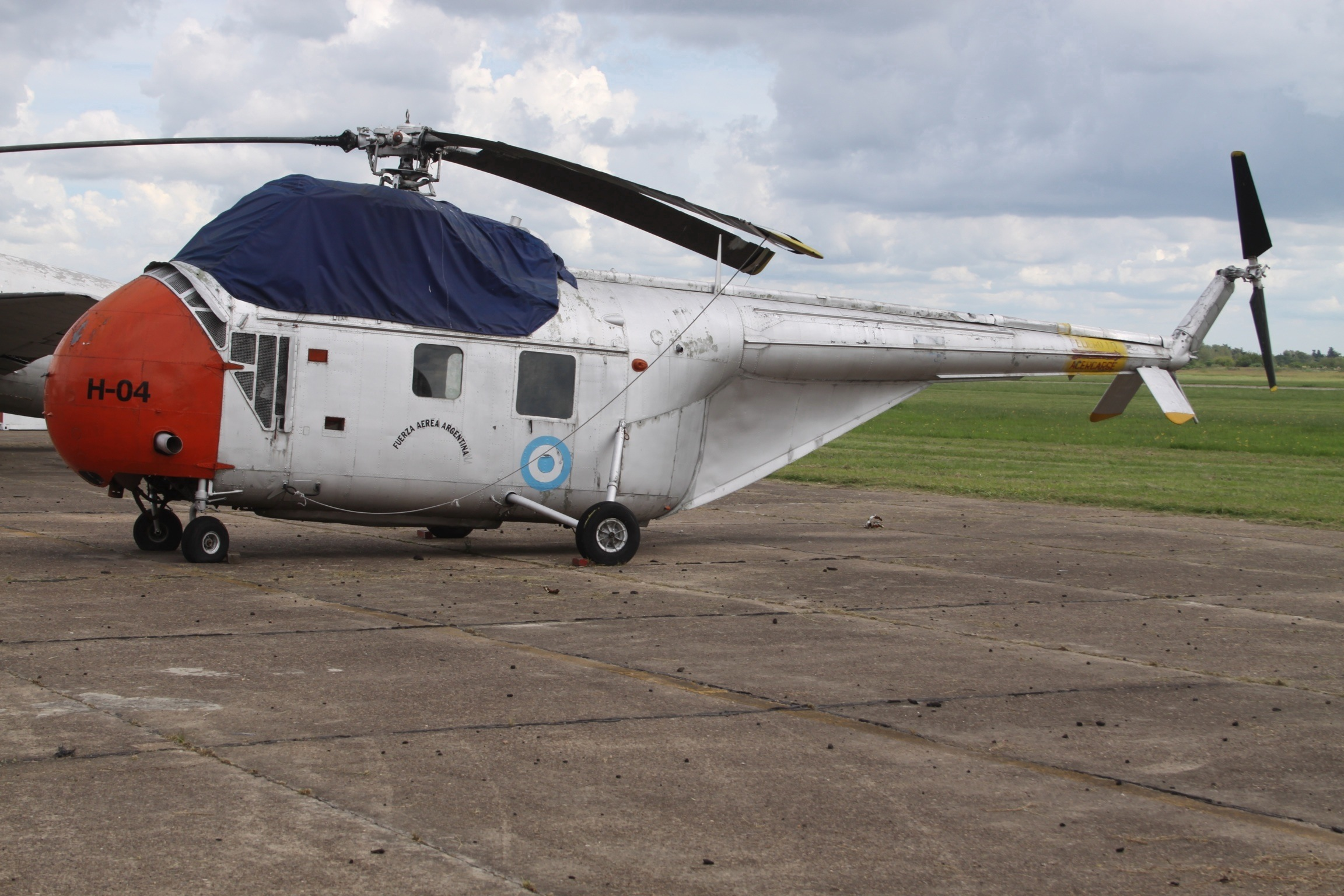
Sikorsky S-55 H-04

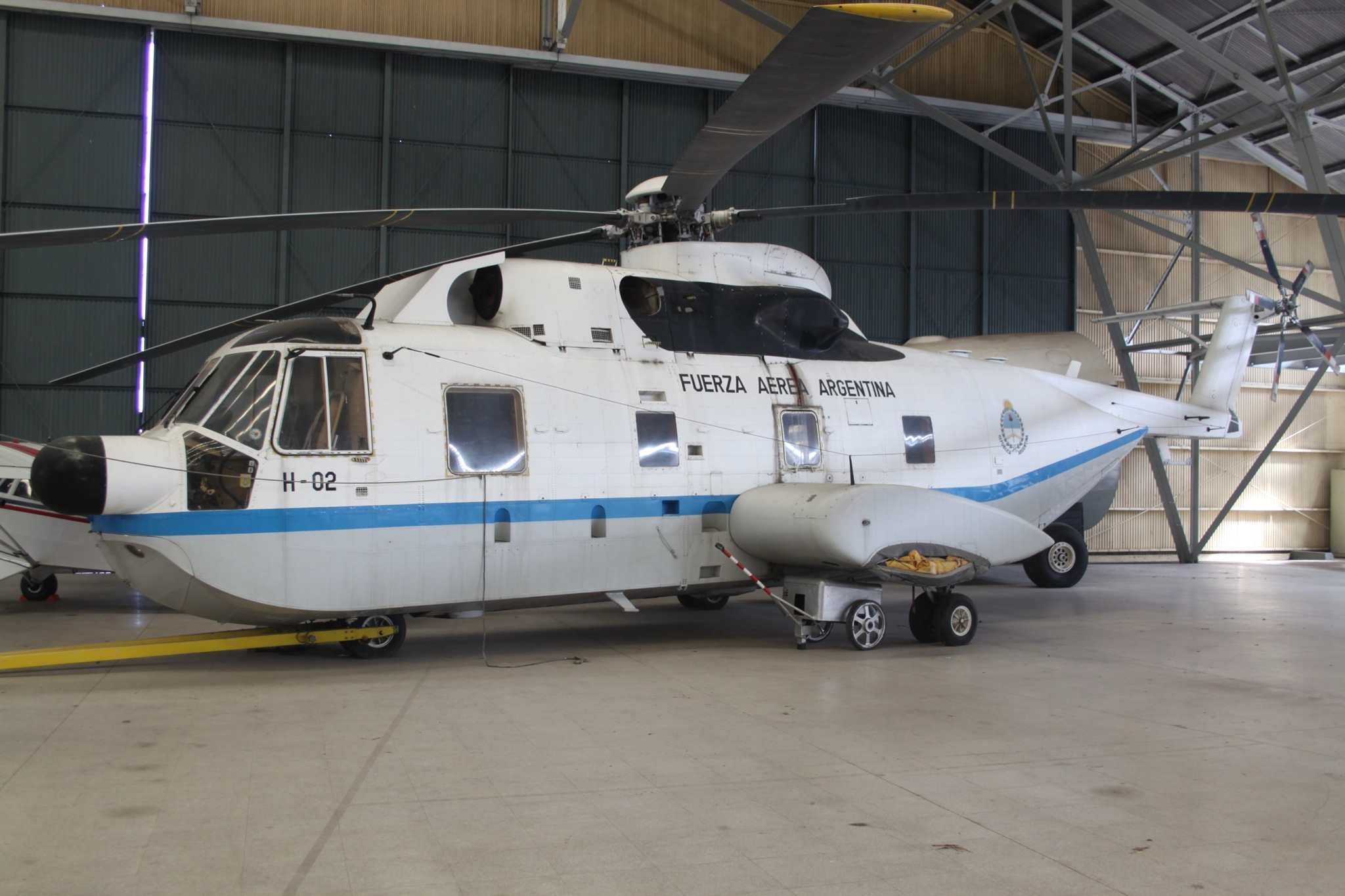
Sikorsky S-61 H-02

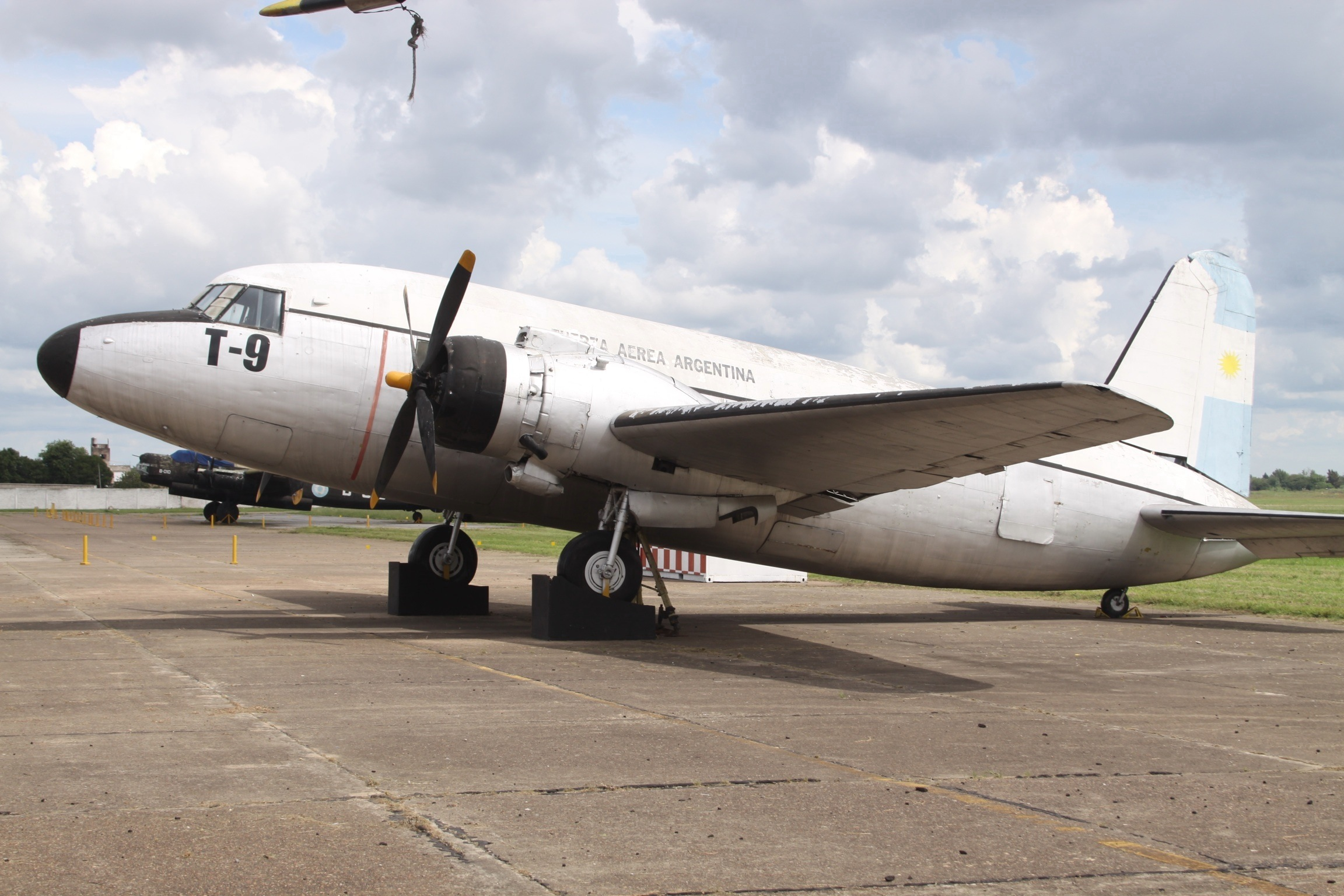
Vickers Viking

=== Other objects displayed ===
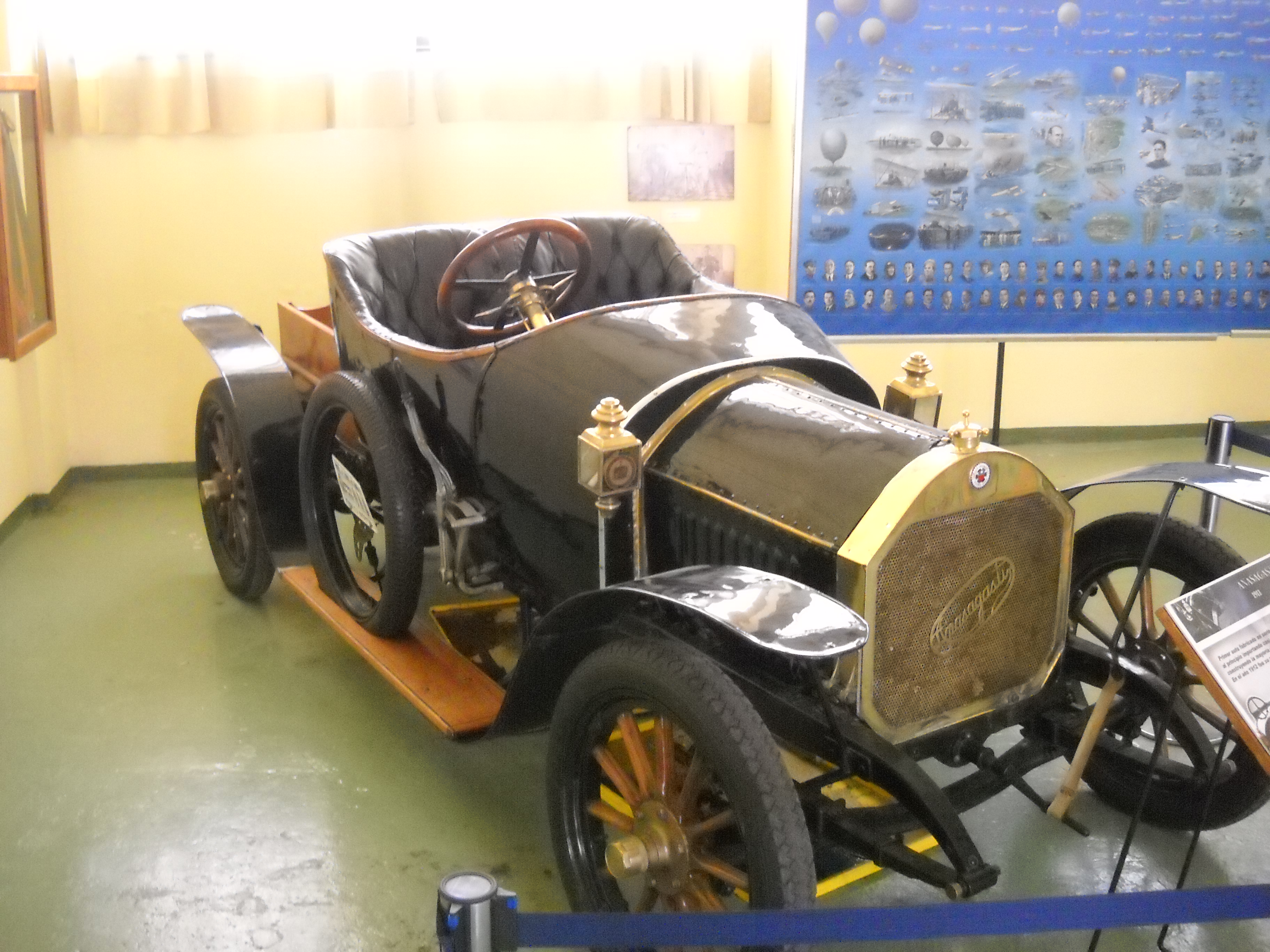
Automobile Anasagasti, 1914

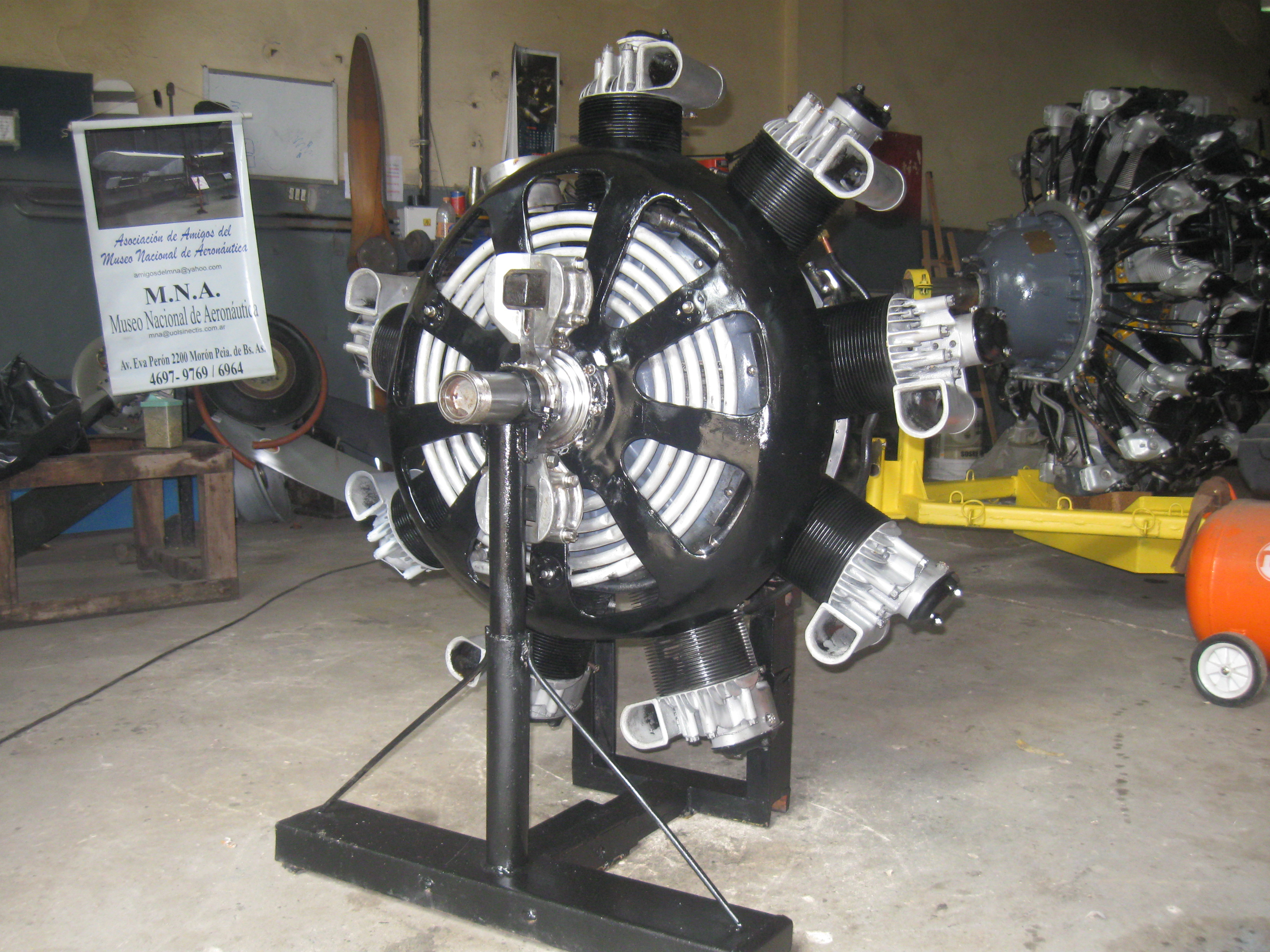
Packard DR-980 engine

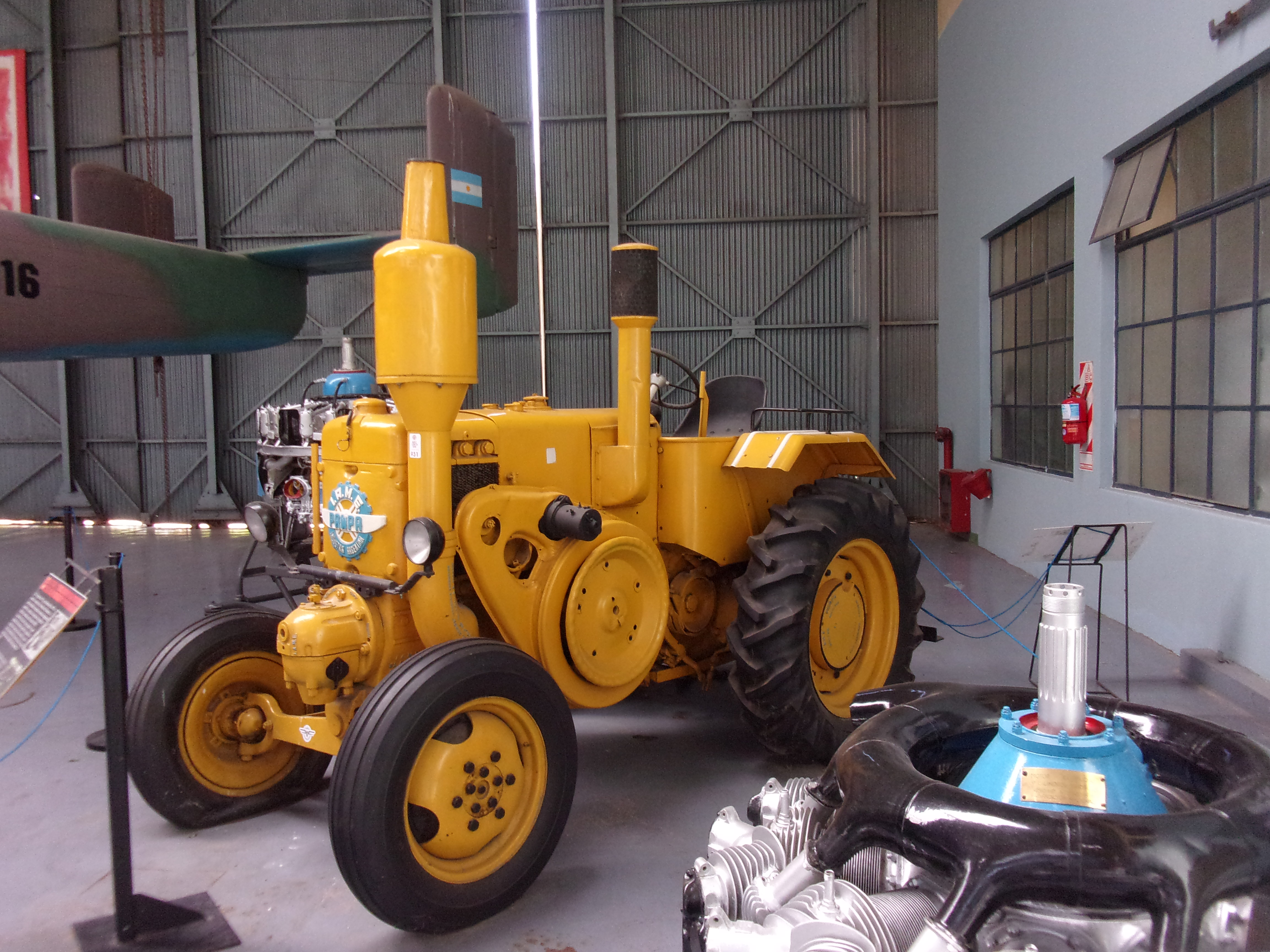
Pampa tractor, 1952

== See also ==
- List of aerospace museums
