= Shelby Charter Township, Michigan =

Shelby Township, Michigan
- Charter township
- Charter Township of Shelby
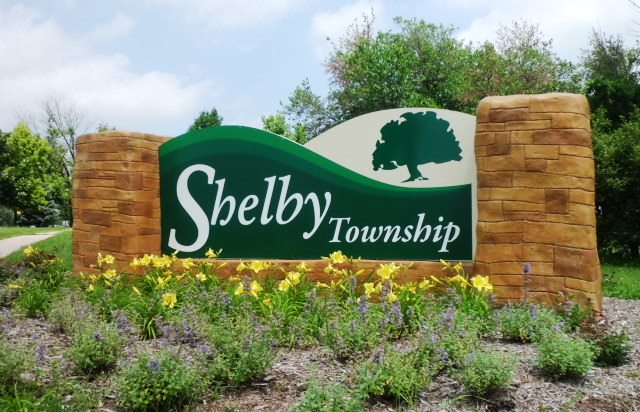
- Shelby Charter Township welcome sign

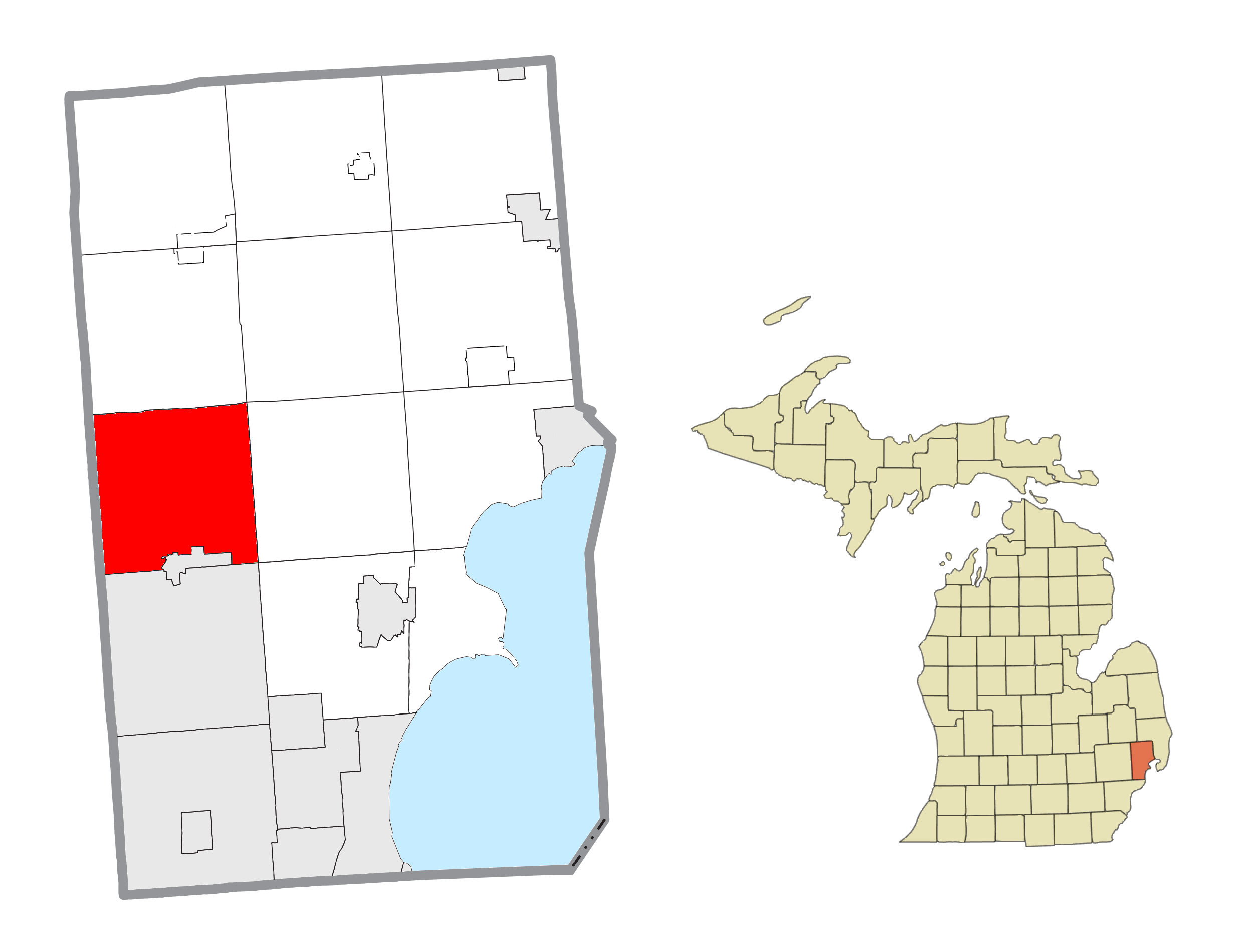
- Location within Macomb County

- Location within Michigan Location within the United States
- Coordinates: 42°40′15″N 83°01′59″W
- Country: United States
- State: Michigan
- County: Macomb

Government
  - Type: Board of trustees–supervisor
  - Supervisor: Richard Stathakis
  - Clerk: Stanley Grot
  - Treasurer: James Carabelli
  - Trustees: Lisa Casali, John Vermeulen, Vincent Viviano, Lynn Wilhelm

Area
  - Total: 35.2 sq mi (91 km^{2})
  - Land: 34.4 sq mi (89 km^{2})
  - Water: 0.8 sq mi (2.1 km^{2})
- Elevation: 679 ft (207 m)

Population (2020)
  - Total: 79,408
  - Density: 2,307.9/sq mi (891.1/km^{2})
- Time zone: UTC-5 (Eastern (EST))
  - Summer (DST): UTC-4 (EDT)
- ZIP Codes: 48315, 48316, 48317
- Area codes: 248 and 586
- FIPS code: 26-72820
- GNIS ID: 1627062
- Website: shelbytwp.org

Shelby Charter Township, officially the Charter Township of Shelby, is a charter township located in Macomb County in the U.S. state of Michigan. The township is an affluent northern suburb of Detroit. As of the 2020 census, the population was 79,408, up from 73,804 in 2010. Shelby Charter Township is one of the fastest-growing communities in Metro Detroit.

== History ==
Shelby Township was set off by an act of the Michigan Territorial Legislature on April 12, 1827, and a civil government was organized the following May. It originally included the area that is now Sterling Heights, which was set off March 17, 1835, as the township of Jefferson, renamed to Sterling on March 6, 1838. Utica, located on the southern edge of the township, originally incorporated as a village on March 9, 1838, although that corporation was dissolved soon afterwards. The village was incorporated for a second time on May 10, 1877.

The village of Disco (42°41′02″N 83°02′04″W) was located at what is now the junction of 24 Mile Road and Van Dyke Road. and was platted in 1849. The community never incorporated, although the local high school, the Disco Academy, gained some local recognition and a post office named Disco operated from May 5, 1854, until July 31, 1906. Only a few homes and a namesake on old county road maps remain of this now forgotten historic place. See also: "The Lost Village of Disco" on the Shelby Township Historical Society website.

== Geography ==
Shelby Township is in western Macomb County and is bordered to the west by the cities of Rochester and Rochester Hills in Oakland County. The cities of Utica and Sterling Heights border the township to the south. Mount Clemens, the Macomb county seat, is 11 miles (18 km) to the southeast, and downtown Detroit is 24 miles (39 km) to the south.

According to the United States Census Bureau, the township has a total area of 35.2 square miles (91 km^{2}), of which 34.4 square miles (89 km^{2}) are land and 0.8 square miles (2.1 km^{2}), or 2.31%, are water. The township is drained by the Clinton River, a tributary of Lake St. Clair.

== Communities ==
There are no incorporated villages and four unincorporated communities:

- Preston Corners is located at the corner of 25 Mile and Schoenherr roads at 42°41′58″N 82°59′45″W. Ira and Deborah Preston bought 400 acres (1.6 km^{2}) of land from the United States government in 1826 and settled on it the following year, later building a sawmill and a picket fence factory.
- Shelby is located at Shelby and 25 Mile Roads (42°41′51″N 83°04′10″W).
- Shelby Village is located where Auburn and Ryan roads intersect. Housing was built in this area in the 1940s.
- Yates is on the boundary with Rochester and Rochester Hills, Oakland County (42°40′25″N 83°05′45″W ; Elevation: 669 ft./204 m.).

== Main highways ==
Shelby Charter Township sits on two main thoroughfares:

State highways

- M-53, commonly called Van Dyke Avenue or the Van Dyke Expressway, which leads north into the Thumb
- M-59, commonly called Hall Road when the expressway ends - which is the east–west connector from just north of Mount Clemens, through Utica as a surface road, and then becomes a limited access freeway to Pontiac, Michigan, being the main northern connector between Macomb County and Oakland County.

== Demographics ==
As of the census of 2010, there were 73,804 people, 28,299 households, and 17,923 families living in the township. The racial makeup of the township was 89.4% White, 3.1% African American, 3.3% Asian, 0.3% from other races, and 1.5% from two or more races. Hispanic or Latino of any race were 2.4% of the population.

The U.S. Census Bureau defined Shelby Charter Township as a census-designated place (CDP) in the 2000 Census so that the community would appear on the list of places (like cities and villages) as well on the list of county subdivisions (like other townships). The final statistics for the township and the CDP were identical. As of the census of 2000, there were 65,159 people, 24,486 households, and 17,923 families living in the township. The population density was 1,878.7 inhabitants per square mile (725.4/km^{2}). There were 25,265 housing units at an average density of 728.5 per square mile (281.3/km^{2}). The racial makeup of the township was 94.95% White, 0.85% African American, 0.24% Native American, 2.11% Asian, 0.02% Pacific Islander, 0.45% from other races, and 1.38% from two or more races. Hispanic or Latino of any race were 1.71% of the population.

There were 24,486 households, out of which 33.7% had children under the age of 18 living with them, 62.6% were married couples living together, 7.3% had a female householder with no husband present, and 26.8% were non-families. 21.6% of all households were made up of individuals, and 6.6% had someone living alone who was 65 years of age or older. The average household size was 2.65 and the average family size was 3.13.

In the township the population dispersal was 24.9% under the age of 18, 8.5% from 18 to 24, 31.0% from 25 to 44, 25.1% from 45 to 64, and 10.5% who were 65 years of age or older. The median age was 37 years. For every 100 females, there were 99.6 males. For every 100 females age 18 and over, there were 97.7 males.

The median income for a household in the township was $65,291, and the median income for a family was $76,312. Males had a median income of $59,380 versus $33,844 for females. The per capita income for the township was $30,131. About 2.7% of families and 3.7% of the population were below the poverty line, including 4.1% of those under age 18 and 5.1% of those age 65 or over.

== Government ==
Shelby Charter Township has a Supervisor-Board style township government with elected supervisor, clerk, treasurer and four trustees. The Township operates the Shelby Township Library as well as Cherry Creek Golf Course.

== Education ==
The majority of residents are zoned into Eisenhower Senior High School (commonly referred to as "Ike") within Utica Community Schools, which serves parts of the communities of Sterling Heights, Macomb Township, Washington Township, and Ray Township, as well as most of Shelby Charter Township, and all of Utica. However, a small number of residents are zoned into Romeo Community Schools.

== Notable people ==
- Robb Brent, racing driver
- Joe Cada, professional poker player
- Kyle Connor, former hockey player at the University of Michigan and current player on Winnipeg Jets
- Greg DeLiso, model and actor famous for his role on Certain Burton
- John DiGiorgio, linebacker for the Buffalo Bills
- Shawn Fain, president of the United Automobile Workers of America
- Karl Iagnemma, robotics researcher and fiction writer
- John James, Republican businessman, former military officer, nominee for U.S. Senate in 2018 and 2020, U.S. representative for Michigan's 10th congressional district (2023-present), and candidate for Governor of Michigan in 2026
- Steven Juncaj, soccer player for SK Austria Klagenfurt
- John Mazza, eight-time titlist on the Professional Bowlers Association (PBA) Tour
- Justin Meram, soccer player who represented the Iraq national team
- Peter Litvin, actor, music producer, film maker, audio engineer, composer, songwriter, performer, YouTuber, multi-instrumentalist
- Lance Long, former NFL wide receiver
- Brad Smith, racing driver
- Jax Taylor, model and actor famous for his role on Vanderpump Rules
- Andrew Bogusz, racing driver

== Notable places ==
- Stony Creek Metropark, predominantly located in Washington Township, and Oakland County; a small portion of the park extends into Shelby Charter Township. The park includes two beaches, golf courses, a nature center, a boat launch, picnic areas, basketball courts, a zip-line park (Closed in 2018) and more.
- Packard Proving Grounds - National Historic Place
- Yates Cider Mill and Yates Park, partially located in Shelby Charter TWP, predominantly located in Rochester Hills and Rochester. The water-powered cider mill near the Clinton River includes a confectionery and cider shop, picnic and fishing areas, hiking trails and more.
- Macomb Orchard Trail, partially located in Shelby Charter TWP, is a 23.7 mile hiking trail that stretches from Shelby Charter TWP, at its connection with the Clinton River Trail, through northern Macomb County.
- Riverbend Park, a 600-acre public park whose main entrance is located at 22 Mile & Shelby Road. Amenities include the Burgess-Shadbush Nature Center, 18 hole disc golf course, walking trails, as well as a barrier-free playground. The site also offers fishing, picnic facilities, and several sports opportunities.
