= The Feeling of Flying =

Studio album by Markis Precise
- Released: July 28, 2015
- Genre: Hip hop
- Length: 48:58
- Label: Ineffable Records
- Producer: Markis Precise

Markis Precise chronology
The Feeling of Flying (2015)	No Wings Without Scars (2020)

Singles from The Feeling of Flying
- 1. "The Feeling of Flying (featuring Brother Ali)" Released: June 30, 2015

The Feeling of Flying is the debut studio album by American producer Markis Precise. It was released on July 28, 2015, under Ineffable Records. The album is produced entirely by Markis Precise, and features guest appearances by Brother Ali, Fashawn, Elzhi, Oddisee, Ras Kass, Strong Arm Steady, Zion I, The Grouch, Eligh, Gift of Gab (of Blackalicious), Sol, and Chuuwee.

Cover art for the album was designed by contemporary painter and street artist Shai Dahan, who painted all of the featured artists' names to form the shape of a flying bird.

== Critical reception ==
In its first week of release, The Feeling of Flying became the number one "most added" album on the national CMJ Hip-Hop Charts, with various tracks receiving steady airplay on both commercial and non-commercial radio stations, as well as placements on weekly top ten lists throughout the following weeks.

RESPECT. magazine described the album as "a 13-track exploration of lyricism, sound, and vivid storytelling that returns hip-hop to an organic state, blending new wave content with the idealogical foundation on which hip-hop was built ... [The album] demonstrates the power of the pen while implementing various instrumentation and scratching, and positions the focus on crafting lasting records that will ultimately benefit the culture ... Markis Precise and The Feeling of Flying reminds us of one thing: what hip-hop is supposed to feel like." Amoeba Music commented, "Noteworthy of the collaborative album is the Fresno producer's gift at pairing just the right music with each of his vocal collaborators. He manages to bring out the very best in his guest emcees."

The first single and title track of the album, "The Feeling of Flying" featuring Brother Ali, was praised by legendary rapper Chuck D, who included it on his list of Songs That Mean Something. The track also remained on the Top 10 Select list of Chuck D's WBAI radio show for several weeks, peaking at number two. On July 31, 2015, Chuck D recognized another song from the album, "Leaving the Hood" featuring Gift of Gab, as the Spit of The Week.

== Track listing ==
- All tracks produced by Markis Precise

No.	Title	Length
1.	"It's Alright"	0:57
2.	"Frequency" (featuring Zion I)	3:46
3.	"Kiss the Ring" (featuring Elzhi & Fashawn)	3:23
4.	"Forever & Always" (featuring The Grouch)	4:30
5.	"Back to Life" (featuring Eligh)	4:56
6.	"For You" (featuring Strong Arm Steady)	3:31
7.	"Skateboard" (featuring Fashawn)	3:46
8.	"Ride or Die" (featuring Sol)	3:30
9.	"When I Stopped Looking" (featuring Oddisee)	4:14
10.	"For Heaven's Sake" (featuring Chuuwee)	4:46
11.	"Leaving the Hood" (featuring Gift of Gab of Blackalicious)	3:44
12.	"5 Fingers of Fresh" (featuring Ras Kass)	3:37
13.	"The Feeling of Flying" (featuring Brother Ali)	4:18
