= Ian Kennelly =

American football player (born 2001)

Trine Thunder
- Title: Linebackers coach

Personal information
- Born: February 12, 2001 (age 25); Macomb, Michigan, U.S.
- Listed height: 6 ft 2 in (1.88 m)
- Listed weight: 205 lb (93 kg)

Career information
- Position: Safety
- High school: Utica Eisenhower (Shelby Township, Michigan)
- College: Grand Valley State (2019–2024)
- NFL draft: 2025: undrafted

Career history

Playing
- Detroit Lions (2025)*; Edmonton Elks (2026)*
- * Offseason or practice squad member only

Coaching
- Trine (2026–present) Linebackers coach

Ian Kennelly (born February 12, 2001) is an American college football coach and former professional football safety. He is the linebackers coach for Trine University, a position he has held since 2026. He previously played college football for the Grand Valley State Lakers.

== Early life ==
Kennelly attended high school at Utica Eisenhower High School located in Metro Detroit. Coming out of high school, he committed to play college football for the Grand Valley State Lakers.

== College career ==
During his collegiate career from 2019 through 2024 with the Lakers, he played in 49 total games, where he notched 174 tackles, eight interceptions, three fumble recoveries, two forced fumbles, and a blocked punt, where he earned first-team All-GLIAC honors twice in 2023 and 2024. After the conclusion of the 2024 season, Kennelly declared for the 2025 NFL draft.

== Professional career ==
Pre-draft measurables
Height	Weight	Arm length	Hand span	40-yard dash	10-yard split	20-yard split	20-yard shuttle	Three-cone drill	Vertical jump	Broad jump
6 ft 2 in (1.88 m)	209 lb (95 kg)	29 7/8 in (0.76 m)	8 1/2 in (0.22 m)	4.52 s	1.57 s	2.63 s	4.18 s	7.28 s	35.0 in (0.89 m)	10 ft 4 in (3.15 m)
All values from Pro Day

After not being selected in the 2025 NFL draft, Kennelly signed with the Detroit Lions as an undrafted free agent. He entered the 2025 season, as one of the Lions top UDFA's as he competed for a 53-man roster spot. In his preseason debut in the 2025 Hall of Fame Game, Kennelly, recorded six tackles versus the Los Angeles Chargers. He was waived on August 26 as part of final roster cuts.

Kennelly signed with the CFL's Edmonton Elks on January 23, 2026. He was released on May 31 as part of final roster cuts.
