= Eisenhower High School (Michigan) =

Dwight D. Eisenhower Senior High School

Location
- 6500 25 Mile Road; Shelby Township, Michigan 48316; United States; 42.697°N 83.049°W

Information
- Type: High school
- Established: 1972
- School district: Utica Community Schools
- Superintendent: Robert S. Monroe
- Principal: Brandon Manzella
- Teaching staff: 82.80 (FTE)
- Grades: 10-12
- Enrollment: 1,724 (2023-2024)
- Student to teacher ratio: 20.82
- Colors: Blue and silver
- Nickname: Eagles
- Rival: Romeo High School, Stevenson High School
- Website: eisenhower.uticak12.org

Dwight D. Eisenhower Senior High School (colloquially referred to as Ike), is a high school located in the Metro Detroit suburb of Shelby Township, Michigan, United States.

== History ==
Opened in 1972, Eisenhower is one of two public high school located in Shelby Township. Until the 1990s, the school had a Washington Township mailing address. As the surrounding area began to develop, the zip code boundaries changed and the school fell into a Shelby Township zip code. The original design of the school had few windows and no walls in the individual wings, giving the school an open concept. This open concept failed, as multiple classes could be heard at the same time. The building was quickly segmented into its current classroom structure. Today, the surrounding area is suburban (a part of Metro Detroit), and has subdivisions and strip-malls within the school's immediate proximity. Over the years, Eisenhower has received several renovations. In 2002, the restrooms adjacent to the Commons were extensively renovated. In 2004, the current media center and library were constructed. The following year, in 2005, the Performing Arts Center (PAC) was constructed on the easternmost side of the school.

== Competitions ==
Eisenhower's Quiz Bowl team has won four state championships (the 1989, 1992, and 2000 Michigan State Championship Quiz Bowl and the 2000 Michigan NAQT State Championship Tournament) and two national championships (the 1990 and 2000 American Scholastics Competition Network Tournament of Champions).

Eisenhower's Varsity Dance Team has earned top honors multiple times in regional competitions, as well as the UDA National Dance Team Championship under coach Rachelle Kiehle.

In 2015, the team placed first in Hip Hop and second in Jazz, while Eisenhower's Junior Varsity Dance Team scored their first national championship with their Pom routine and took third place in Jazz.

On February 5, 2017, both teams captured first place gold as Eisenhower JV Dance won the Pom division and Eisenhower Varsity Dance topped both the Hip Hop and Jazz categories.

The Eisenhower Science Olympiad team placed first in the High School division at the Region 7 tournament in 2022, competing against schools in Macomb and St. Clair counties. This continued the team's first-place streak which began in 2019. The team also placed first in the region in 1992, 1995, 2002 and 2005.

The team has a long history of strong performance in Michigan, all the way back to the beginning of the Science Olympiad program in 1983. Eisenhower placed second in the state that first year. The most competitive Eisenhower team was probably during the years of 1987 to 1990, when the team placed first twice, and second twice, in the state. Typically, the top two Michigan teams qualify to compete at the National tournament.

== Academics ==
Student assessments
- 2021–22 school year Change vs. prior year

M-STEP 11th grade proficiency rates (Science / Social Studies)
- Advanced %: 18.8 / 11.0
- Proficient %: 29.3 / 29.2
- PR. Proficient %: 17.5 / 45.8
- Not Proficient %: 34.4 / 14.0

Average test scores
- SAT Total: 1046.7 (▲ +8.7)

As of the 2014–2015 school year, Eisenhower ranked better than 89.9% of all high schools in Michigan. As such, Eisenhower is the top performing high school in Macomb County, and one of the top performing high schools in the Metro Detroit area.

Eisenhower students have a variety of AP courses to choose from. Eisenhower's AP participation rate is 55%.

== Student body ==
Breakdown of student body (2013–2014 school year)

- White: 1,951 (95%)
- African American: 45 (2%)
- Asian: 38 (2%)
- Hispanic: 16 (1%)

== Publications ==
Eisenhower's publications department is advised by former Oakland Press journalist Erica L. Kincannon, and has received numerous awards at both the state and national levels. The department produces an annual school yearbook, Esprit de Corps, and a monthly newspaper, The Eagle's Eye. The newspaper also features an online website, IkeNews.com. Students may elect to join the newspaper and/or yearbook staffs, and take them as a class during the day.

In 2012, Esprit de Corps was named a Pacemaker Finalist by the National Scholastic Press Association, one of the most prestigious awards of journalistic excellence.

In 2014, The Eagle's Eye editor-in-chief, Lauren Kostiuk, was named Michigan High School Journalist of the Year.

== Key Club ==
Eisenhower's Key Club was formed in 1973. During the 2008–2009 school year, Key Club, for the first time in its history, was awarded the honored title of "Diamond-Level Distinguished" (the highest honor a Key Club may receive). IKE was one of the two Michigan Key Clubs to receive the title that year.

== Notable alumni ==
- John DiGiorgio, former professional NFL player
- Luke Drzewiecki, college football placekicker for the Minnesota Golden Gophers
- Steven Juncaj, professional soccer player for SK Austria Klagenfurt
- Dan Keczmer, former professional ice hockey player, played in the NHL
- Ian Kennelly, NFL player
- Peter Litvin, actor, music producer, film maker, audio engineer, composer, songwriter, performer, YouTuber, multi-instrumentalist
- Lance Long, former professional NFL player
- Justin Meram, Iraqi-American professional soccer player, played for MLS side Real Salt Lake
- Chloe Moriondo, singer-songwriter
- Brad Smith, racing driver
- Jax Taylor, television personality, model, and actor
