= Shai Dahan =

American painter

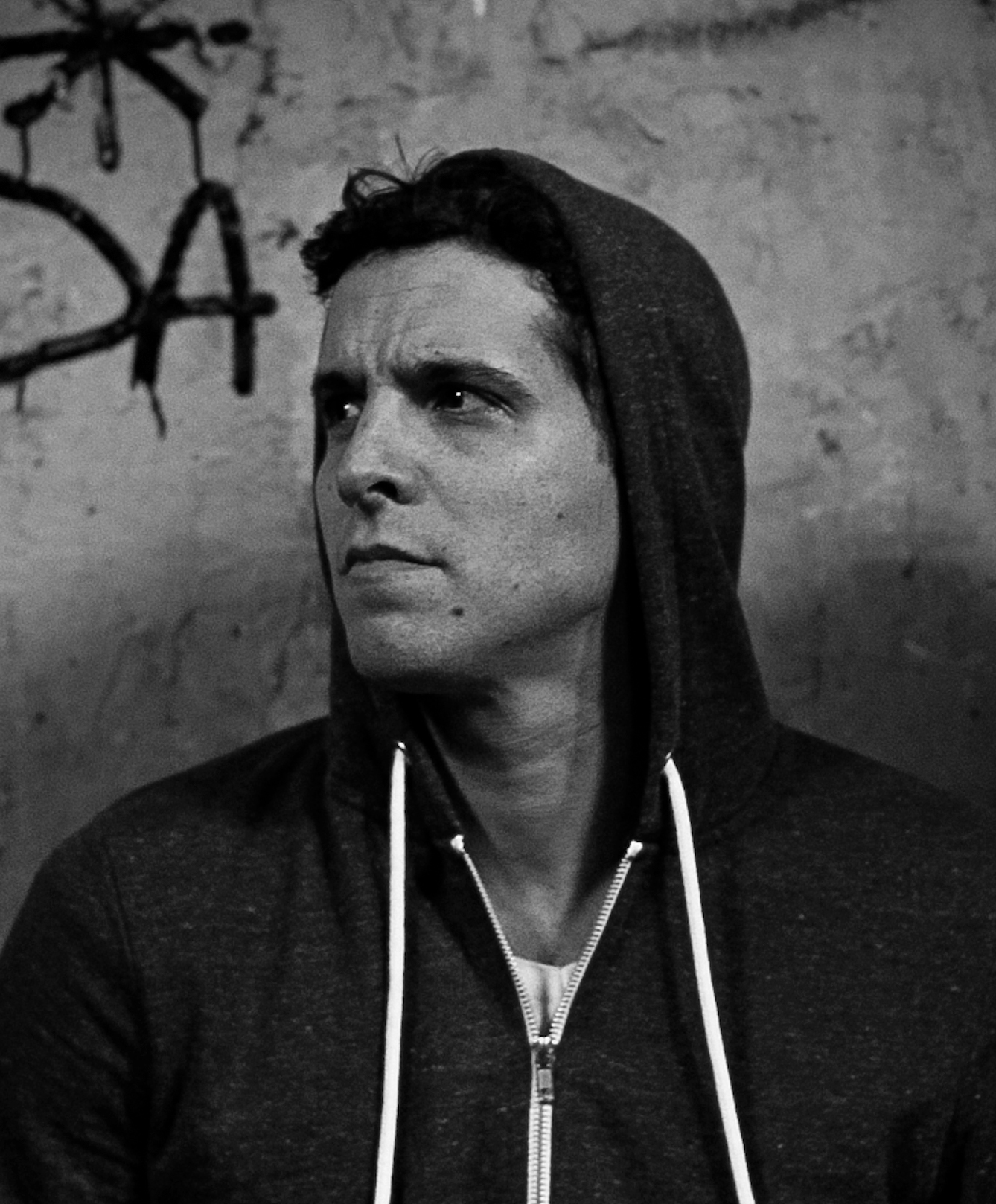
- Born: 26 June 1979 (age 47)
- Known for: Contemporary art, graffiti, Street Art, public art
- Movement: Street Art, Contemporary
- Awards: Ambassador to the city of Borås, TEDxGoteborg keynote speaker, United Buddy Bear, Sjuhärad Top-20 most successful talents
- Website: www.shaidahan.com

Shai Dahan (born 1979) is an American contemporary painter and street artist who works with painting, drawing, illustrations and sculptures.

In 2007, Dahan moved to New York City where he participated in street-art projects such as the NYSAT, Underbelly Project, and MOM&POPism. He also began to exhibit his art with galleries in Los Angeles, New York, Boston, and Philadelphia. In July 2012, Dahan received recognition for his solo exhibition at the Borås Art Museum in Sweden. He was later featured as the opening keynote speaker at TEDx Göteborg in October 2012. Dahan was also awarded to paint a two-meter United Buddy Bear for the city of Borås in Sweden. A limited-edition version of the United Buddy Bears were also created by Dahan as part of the Borås Buddy Bear Mini Festival in December.

In 2019, Dahan painted Sweden's largest outdoor mural in Ryavallen stadium which is over 950 square meters. The mural was painted as part of the European Athletics U20 Championships.

Dahan has been awarded as Ambassador of the city of Borås on June 29, 2019. He has also been named one of Borås 40 Under 40 Most Successful People.

== Life and career ==
Shai Dahan was born in Haifa, Israel and moved to the United States in 1989. He began his art career in Los Angeles, where he was highly involved with the skateboarding and surf culture. At 14, Dahan was introduced to the graffiti culture and started to create graffiti influenced art. In his early 20s, he continued painting urban influenced art on skateboards and surfboards for projects and charities, including "Life Rolls On" charity in Los Angeles as well as STOKED Mentoring in NYC.

Shortly after moving to Manhattan in 2007, Dahan took part in the New York Street Advertising Takeover through Public Ad Campaign. Since then, Dahan also took part in the Toronto Street Advertising Takeover, as well as the Madrid Street Advertising Takeover.

In 2009, Dahan participated in MOM&POPism, a project presented by Gawker Media to present street-artist painting over the photographs of James and Karla Murray. The project was published as a book in 2011 by Gingko Press.

Dahan also designed the Spirit Award for Stoked Mentoring which honored pro skateboarder Rob Dyrdek. The award was created by Dahan and given to Rob at the event held in Los Angeles in December, 2009.

In mid 2010, Dahan was part of the Underbelly Project in New York City. He was one of 103 other street-artists invited as a select group to paint an abandoned subway station. The project, which received much media attention through the New York Times and London Times, was also published as a book titled "We Own The Night" in 2012 through Rizzoli Publication.

After moving to Sweden in late 2010, Dahan continued to exhibit internationally, as well as in Scandinavia including solo exhibitions in Gothenburg and Stockholm and most notably, a solo exhibit at the Modern Art Museum in Borås, Sweden. This was the first time the museum invited an artist from a graffiti/street-art background.

In June 2011, Dahan painted a live mural at the Gothenburg STCC Race VIP Dinner which included the car racing team of Prince Philip of Sweden.

In January 2012 the Borås Art Museum invited Dahan for a solo exhibition to run from May until September 2012. The exhibition was the first time the museum invited an artist with a graffiti/street-art background to do an exhibition. As part of the museum exhibit, Dahan was invited by the city of Borås to add a permanent mural in the city center for their bi-annual International Sculpture Festival. The mural of two running Dala Horses at the city center at Sandvallplats eventually was used on the publication cover for the city of Borås quarterly magazine for the end quarter of 2012.

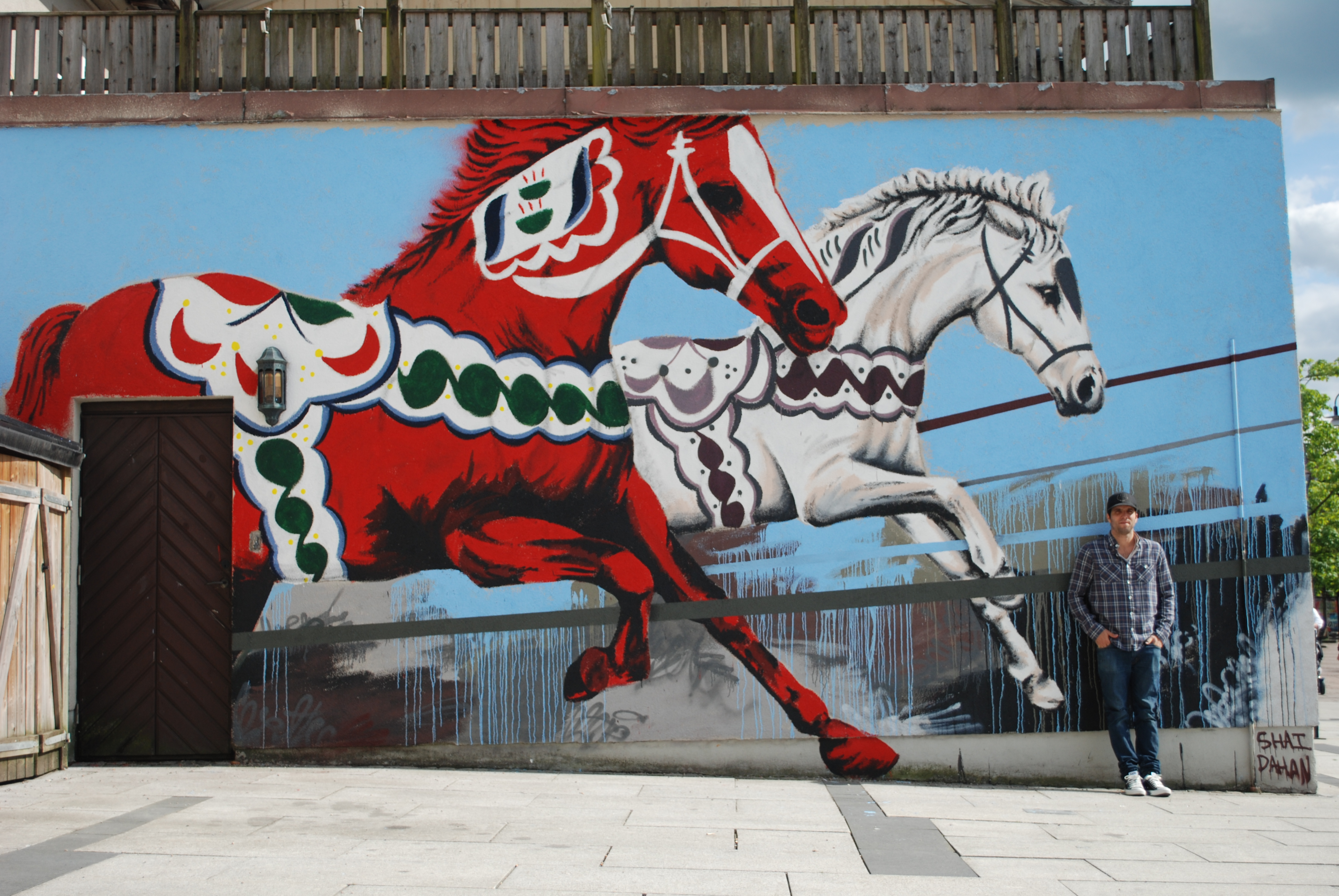
Dahan's mural at Sandvallplats in Sweden 2012

In May 2012, Dahan travelled to Bethlehem in palestinian territories. The trip was documented for a documentary film titled "Art on the Seam" and produced by David Freid and is due to release in late 2012. Dahan painted a large 5 meter mural of an Arab bedouin on the West Bank Barrier wall in Bethlehem after spending 3 days in palestinian territories. In October 2012, Dahan gave a keynote at TEDx Gotebörg titled "Beyond Borders." His keynote at TEDx was about his trip to Palestine and the mural he painted there.

In December 2012, Dahan was awarded in the city of Borås (Sweden) to create a two-meter United Buddy Bear. The sculpture was hand painted by Dahan with the Swedish Dala Horse patterns that he normally combines to his artworks. The Buddy Bear was then revealed at a ceremony and installed permanently at the city tourist bureau. The city also introduced a limited edition mini versions of the bear Dahan created. The edition mini bears were awarded to local sponsors of the Borås Buddy Bear Mini Festival.

In 2013, Dahan co-founded EAST 39th, a Menswear clothing branch based in Sweden. The brand designs, markets, and distributes men fashion apparel across Scandinavia.

In 2014 Dahan curated No Limit Borås Street Art Festival in Borås, Sweden. The festival, which was first announced in September 2013, composed of both international Street-Artists as well as Swedish artists. Artists who participated in the first No Limit festival included Natalia Rak (Poland), ECB Hendrik (Germany), Kobra (Brazil), Etam Cru (Poland), Ollio (Sweden), Carolina Falkholt (Sweden), Ekta (Sweden), Issac Cordal (Spain).Peeta (Italy) and The London Police (Netherlands). The festival was funded and organized by BoråsBorås (part of the Borås Stad Municipality). The festival has continued in 2015 and 2017 with both additions featuring new artists painting across the city of Borås. Dahan has remained as founder and Curating Director.

Dahan has also worked with Princess Sofia Hellqvist of Sweden at Project Playground, a charitable organisation focusing on providing classes for underprivladged children in the township of Langa, South Africa. After traveling to South Africa and spending 10 days at the Project Playground Township, Dahan created an art exhibition in Stockholm Sweden with a new collection of paintings and drawings. All proceeds from the art exhibition went to the charity of Project Playground.

He has also met Her Royal Highness Queen Silvia of Sweden at the FEI Horseshow in Gothenburg. Dahan painting 9 life-size horse sculptures for the city of Gothenburg in corporation with Gothenburg&Co. to promote the FEI International Horse Show. The horses were placed across the city of Gotheburg from June to September 2017. Two of the horses were later auctioned off with the money raised for the Foundation for Queen Silvia's Children's and Youth Hospital. Dahan met Royal Highness Queen Silvia of Sweden at the last day of the Horseshow and presented her with an original painting titled "Hero".

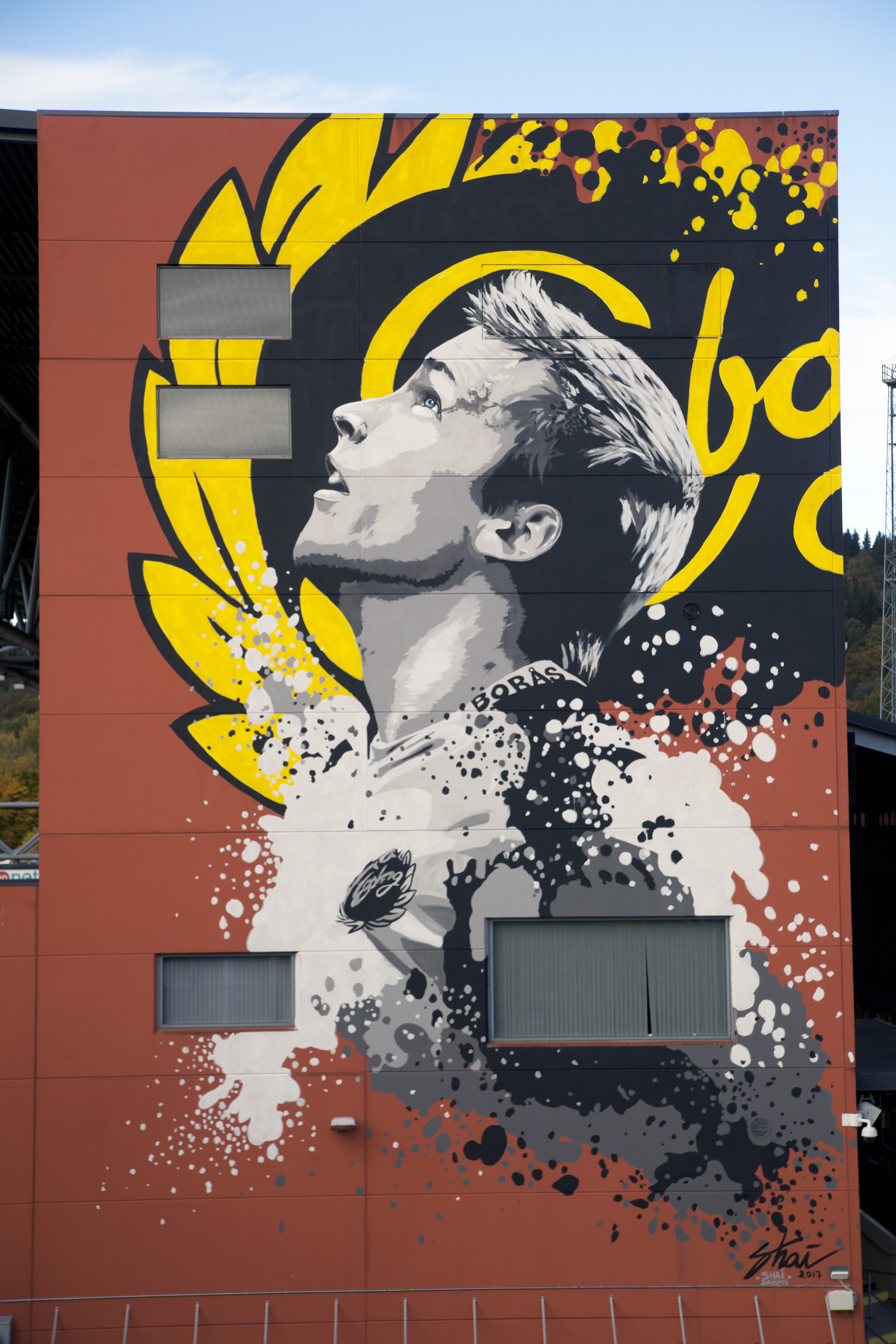
2017 Anders Svensson mural by Dahan, Borås Sweden

In September 2017, Dahan painted an 18-meter mural of Swedish football player Anders Svensson on the outdoor walls of IF Elfsborg Arena. The mural was created to honor Svensson for his long career in football as a player for IF Elfsborg.

In early 2018, it was announced that Dahan has been commissioned by the city of Ulricehamn to install a 3 meter Bronze Horse Sculpture in the park of the Ulricehamn commune. The sculpture, which is a first Bronze installation for Dahan, has been developed since early 2017. It is planned to be installed in Spring of 2018.

In 2019, Dahan painted Sweden's Largest Mural in the city of Borås as part of the European Athletic Championships U20. The wall, which he painted between April and June was over 90 meters long and became Sweden's largest public art mural.

During the birthday celebration of Borås city on June 29, 2019, it was announced that Dahan has been named as the new Ambassador of the city of Borås.

On October 5, 2019 Dahan completed The World's Largest Dala Horse (Dalahäst) on the Lower East Side of New York City. The mural of the Dalecarlian horse has been measured to be 18 meters (59 feet) high, which has been considered to be the World's Largest Dala Horse artwork as of 2019.

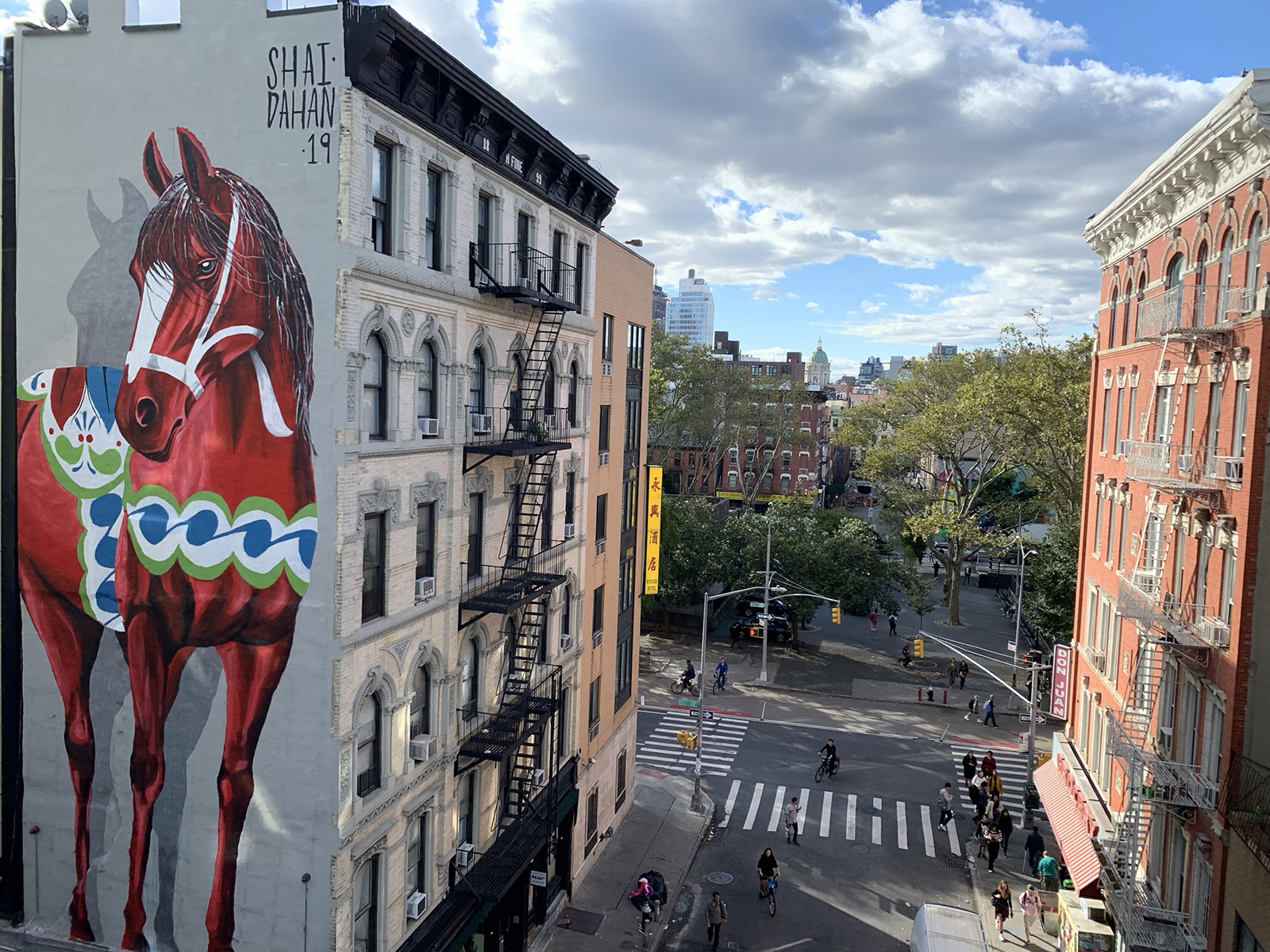
2019 mural of World's Largest Dala Horse painting in New York City, USA

== Techniques and themes ==
Throughout his career, Dahan has used different techniques for his outdoor artwork as well as his gallery collection. This includes stencil, wheatpasting, as well as using both acrylics, oils and spraypaint. Dahan creates hybrids of the urban arts culture mixed with fine art work. In the past, Dahan created his now much recognizable "BirdGun" series which depicts birds with weapons for their heads. This theme eventually grew into including other animals with guns for their heads including a series of DeerGuns, Elkguns, and others.

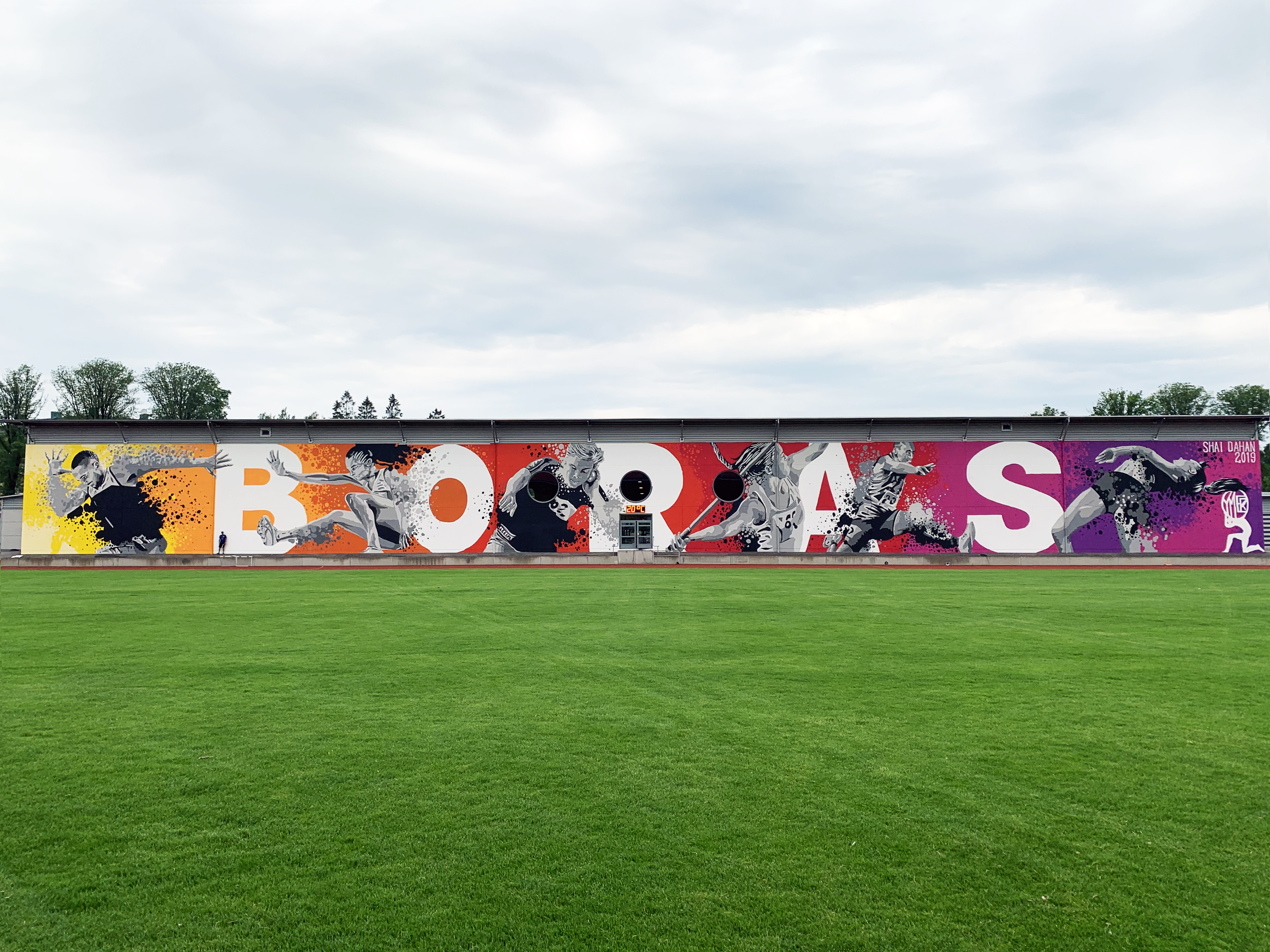
2019 Sweden's Largest Mural by Dahan for Borås City

After moving to Sweden in 2010, Dahan began to create a new reinvention of the Swedish Dala Horse (Dalecarlian horse). Dahan began to paint the Swedish traditional Dala Horse as a realistic horse that carries the Kurbits colors and patterns of the original wooden statuettes. Shortly after creating a few illegal Dala Horse wheatpastes around neighborhoods in Sweden, Dahan's paintings began to generate media attention. After his Dala Horses were published in the newspaper in the city of Borås (Borås Tidning) as well as at Gothenburg Posten publication in Gothenburg, Dahan began to get much attention for his Dala Horse painting and has been mostly recognized in Scandinavian countries for his technique of painting wild horses as the historic Dalahästs.

In 2017 Dahan began painting fiberglass horse sculptures for the FEI Horseshow in Gothenburg. In early 2018 it was announced that Dahan will be installing his first Bronze sculpture in the city of Ulricehamn. The sculpture, which is nearly 3 meters high, will be part of the city commune on a lease program for 24 months.

== Publications ==
=== Books ===
- 2017 "The Art of Spraypaint" (Rockport)
- 2014 "Global Street Art" (Firefly Books)
- 2012 "We Own The Night" (Rizzoli)
- 2011 "Mom & Popism" (Gingko Press)

=== Press ===
- 2017 Gothenburg Posten
- 2017 Expressen
- 2015 The Local
- 2014 Huffington Post
- 2014 Expressen
- 2013 (November) : Dagens Industri Weekend, Scandinavia
- 2013 (April) : The Business Magazine, Scandinavia
- 2013 New York Times
- 2013 Business Magazine of Scandinavia
- 2012 (November) : NORR Magazine, Scandinavia
- 2012 (November) : Dalarna Tidningar, Sweden
- 2012 (November) : Gothenburg Posten, Sweden
- 2012 (November) : SUOD Online Magazine, Sweden
- 2012 (July) : Residence Magazine, Sweden
- 2012 (July) : Borås Tidning
- 2012 (June) : Borås Tidning
- 2012 (May) : Borås Tidning
- 2011 (September) : Borås Tidning
- 2011 (June) : Gothenburg Posten
- 2011 (May) : Metro Newspaper Gothenburg
- 2010 : YRB Magazine
- 2010 New York Times

=== Online ===
- 2017 Gothenburg Posten
- 2017 Expressen
- 2015 The Local
- 2014 Huffington Post
- 2014 Expressen
- 2013 (November) : Dagens Industri Weekend, Scandinavia
- 2013 (April) : The Business Magazine, Scandinavia
- 2013 New York Times
- 2013 : Boras Tidning interview
- 2013 : Fria Tidning interview
- 2012 (May) : Gothenburg Expressen
- 2012 (May) Brooklyn Street Art
- 2011 (August) : SVT Radio
- 2011 (June): Gothenburg Posten
- 2011 (January) : Street Giant
- 2011 (May) : Brooklyn Street Art

== Television ==
- 2016 SVT Sverige!
- 2013 SVT News
- 2013 (November) : SVT Philofix TV Barnkanalen (Sweden)
- 2012 (October) : TV4 (Sweden)

== Radio ==
- 2017 SverigeRadio
- 2016 SverigeRadio
- 2013 (September) : SverigeRadio (Sweden)
- 2013 (June) : SverigeRadio (Sweden)
- 2012 (November) : Nyheter P4 Sjuhärad (Sweden)
- 2011 (August) : Nyheter P4 Sjuhärad (Sweden)
- 2011 (July) : Nyheter P4 Sjuhärad (Sweden)

== Exhibitions ==
=== Solo exhibitions ===
- 2018 West Side Stories
- 2015 Tales Of The Brave, Gothenburg Shai Dahan - solo show - Tales of the Brave.
- 2014 Charity Solo show in Stockholm, Sweden
- 2014 Solo show C.A.V.E. Gallery, Venice, California
- 2013 exhibition at Lars Bolin Gallery, Östersund, Sweden
- 2012 exhibition at A-Gallery, Gothenburg, Sweden
- 2012 Solo exhibition at Borås Museum of Modern Art, Borås Sweden
- 2012 "Vice & Virture"Solo exhibition at The Scarlett Gallery, Stockholm, Sweden
- 2011 "Things Come Undone" Artspace+Us Gallery, Gothenburg Sweden
- 2010 "Natural Selections" Vincent Michael Gallery, Philadelphia USA
- 2010 "Reservoir Art" Grey Dog, New York USA
- 2009 "Deck the Wall" Tiny’s Giant, New York USA
- 2009 "Dog eat Dog" Grey Dog, New York USA
- 2008 "Gothamist House" CMJ, Brooklyn USA

=== Selected group shows ===
- 2013 Group exhibition at Stroke Urban Art Festival, Munich, Germany
- 2012 Group exhibition at A-Gallery, Gothenburg, Sweden
- 2012 "Stencil Art" Galleri Olson, Malmö, Sweden
- 2012 Group show at Art Whino, Maryland USA
- 2011 "Holiday Bazaar" Crewest Gallery, Los Angeles USA
- 2011 "Robots Will Kill Friends" Mighty Tanaka Gallery, Brooklyn USA
- 2011 "Above the Radar II" Fridge Gallery, Washington USA
- 2011 "Anything Goes" Phantom Gallery, New York USA
- 2011 "Heavy Hitters" Andimos, Springfield USA
- 2011 "Heavy Hitters II" Mad Art Gallery, St. Louis USA
- 2011 "Six Degrees of Separation" Crewest Gallery, Los Angeles USA
- 2010 "Friends with Knives" Crewest Gallery, Los Angeles USA
- 2010 "Rogue Status X Abztract" Rogue Status Venue, Venice USA
- 2010 "Stokenphobia" Pandemic Gallery, Brooklyn USA
- 2009 "Art Strikes Back" Art Asylum Gallery, Boston USA
- 2009 "MBP Urban Art Festival" Brooklyn, USA
- 2009 "Abztract Collective" Pandemic Gallery, Brooklyn USA
- 2009 "Mom&Popism" Gawker Media, New York USA
- 2009 "Alt/Art" Gawker Media, New York USA
- 2009 "Life Rolls On II" Los Angeles, USA
- 2008 "Life Rolls On I" Los Angeles, USA

=== Other projects ===
- 2018 Installation of 3 meter Bronze Sculpture, Ulricehamn
- 2017 Mural of Football player Anders Svensson on Boras Arena
- 2017 Installation of 9 sculptures in Gothenburg for FEI Horseshow
- 2017 Founder and Curating Director No Limit Festival, Sweden
- 2017 Bukowskis Live Urban Art Auction
- 2016 Ulricehamn Murals
- 2015 Founder and Curating Director, No Limit Festival
- 2014 Founder and Curating Director, No Limit Festival
- 2013 Musikhjälpen 2013, Gothenburg, Sweden
- 2013 Aqueduct Mural Project, Queens, New York
- 2013 Art Basel Murals, Wynwood, Miami
- 2013 Announcement of No Limit Street-Art Festival, Sweden
- 2013 Launch of EAST 39th on east39.se
- 2013 Project Playground Charity Mural, Cape Town South Africa
- 2013 Philofix Television show appearance, Sweden
- 2013 7Tree Skateboards Collaboration, Sweden
- 2013 Mural At Monumental Art Festival, Gdansk, Poland
- 2013 Mural At Sand, Sea, Spray Urban Art Festival, Blackpool, UK
- 2013 Mural At Stroke Urban Art, Munich, Germany
- 2013 Mural At Subtopia, Stockholm, Sweden
- 2013 H&M X Weekday collaboration, Sweden
- 2013 Gina Tricot Grand Prix Collaboration, Sweden
- 2013 Mural At Liseberg Hotel, Gothenburg, Sweden
- 2013 Collaboration With Seger Europe, Sweden
- 2013 Limited Edition Skateboard Release With 7Tree Skateboards, Sweden
- 2013 Mural At Pulsen, Borås, Sweden
- 2012 Limited Edition Mini Buddy Bears, Borås, Sweden
- 2012 Live Painting Of Buddy Bear, Borås, Sweden
- 2012 Keynote Speaker At Tedx Goteborg
- 2012 Live Painting Of Buddy Bear UNICEF For Boras, Sweden
- 2012 Mural For Gothenburg Culture Festival, Sweden
- 2012 Elvine Clothing Collaboration Release, Worldwide
- 2012 Palestine trip, mural at the wall in Bethlehem, Palestine
- 2012 Mural painting for Sculpture Festival, Borås, Sweden
- 2012 BLK DNM in-store art show, Stockholm Sweden
- 2012 Graffiti Lecture at Särla Skolan
- 2012 Mural painting at Kronobergsgatan, Stockholm USA
- 2012 The Underbelly Project Book release, Worldwide
- 2011 Live painting at Ambience 2012, Sweden
- 2011 Kollektivet Livet Live Painting, Stockholm Sweden
- 2011 Mom&Popism Graffiti book release, Worldwide
- 2011 Fashion Days Live Painting for Fashion Days, Borås Sweden
- 2011 Avalon Hotel Live Painting for KulturKalas Gothenburg Sweden
- 2011 Grand Hotel Live Painting, Borås Sweden
- 2011 “STCC Street Race Dinner Mural Live Painting” Port Du Soleil, Gothenburg Sweden
- 2011 Port Du Soleil outdoor live painting, Gothenburg Sweden
- 2011 Madrid Street Ad Takeover, Madrid Spain
- 2010 “Underbelly” project, New York USA
- 2010 Toronto Street Ad Takeover, Toronto Canada
- 2009 New York Street Ad Takeover, New York USA
