= Hectic Knife =

2016 superhero comedy film

Hectic Knife, written and starring Peter Litvin, written and directed by Greg DeLiso, distributed by Troma Entertainment, 2016

Hectic Knife is a superhero comedy film about a knife-wielding vigilante who fights against drug dealers, murderers and other "baddies," including Piggly Doctor, a villain bent on world domination. The idea for the film gestated as Peter Litvin, who later co-wrote, starred in, and produced the film, and director Greg DeLiso were working on a series titled Short Films for Nobody. Filming began in 2010 and wrapped in 2015. Shortly after the film was finished, DeLiso and Litvin secured distribution via Troma Entertainment.

== Plot ==
Hectic Knife is a meta-homage-parody of super-hero genre films, in the vein of Airplane! and Not Another Teen Movie. The film is a deconstruction of the generic character-types and origin-story tropes of big-budget Hollywood movies featuring dark and brooding anti-hero/vigilantes, such as Batman and The Punisher. In an interview with Film Threat, DeLiso listed some of the influences, which included Assault on Precinct 13 and Scanners, Kill Bill, Marvel and DC comic book movies, Clerks, Indiana Jones and Star Wars.

== Cast ==
Hectic Knife stars Peter Litvin as the titular anti-hero Hectic Knife, and co-stars Georgia Kate Haege as Frannie Glooper, JJ Brine as the Piggly Doctor, and John Munnelly as Link.

== Production ==
In 2010, while Litvin and DeLiso had begun working on the feature-length, super-hero comedy Hectic Knife, which starred Litvin as a knife-wielding vigilante determined to rid his city of crime. DeLiso and Litvin finished Hectic Knife in 2015, and secured distribution via Troma Entertainment shortly after its completion. Hectic Knife premiered at Druid Underground Film Festival in Brooklyn, New York at a screening hosted by Troma Entertainment co-founder Lloyd Kaufman.

== Reception ==
Hectic Knife was on Film Threat's Top 10 Films list of 2017. The film has been reviewed as "Powerfully original - something no one’s ever seen!” by Jack Perez (Mega Shark vs. Giant Octopus, Wild Things 2) and "Weird in all the right ways!” by Chris Gore from Film Threat. Anthony Ray Bench from Film Threat scored it 8 out of 10 and said the film is "insane, fun, hilariously random, and it boldly spits in the face of conventional storytelling".

== Release ==
Hectic Knife was released on Blu-ray on January 9, 2018 and is also available for streaming on Amazon Prime and Troma Now and released on Special Edition VHS and DVD Troma Entertainment.
