= Sol (musician) =

American hip hop artist

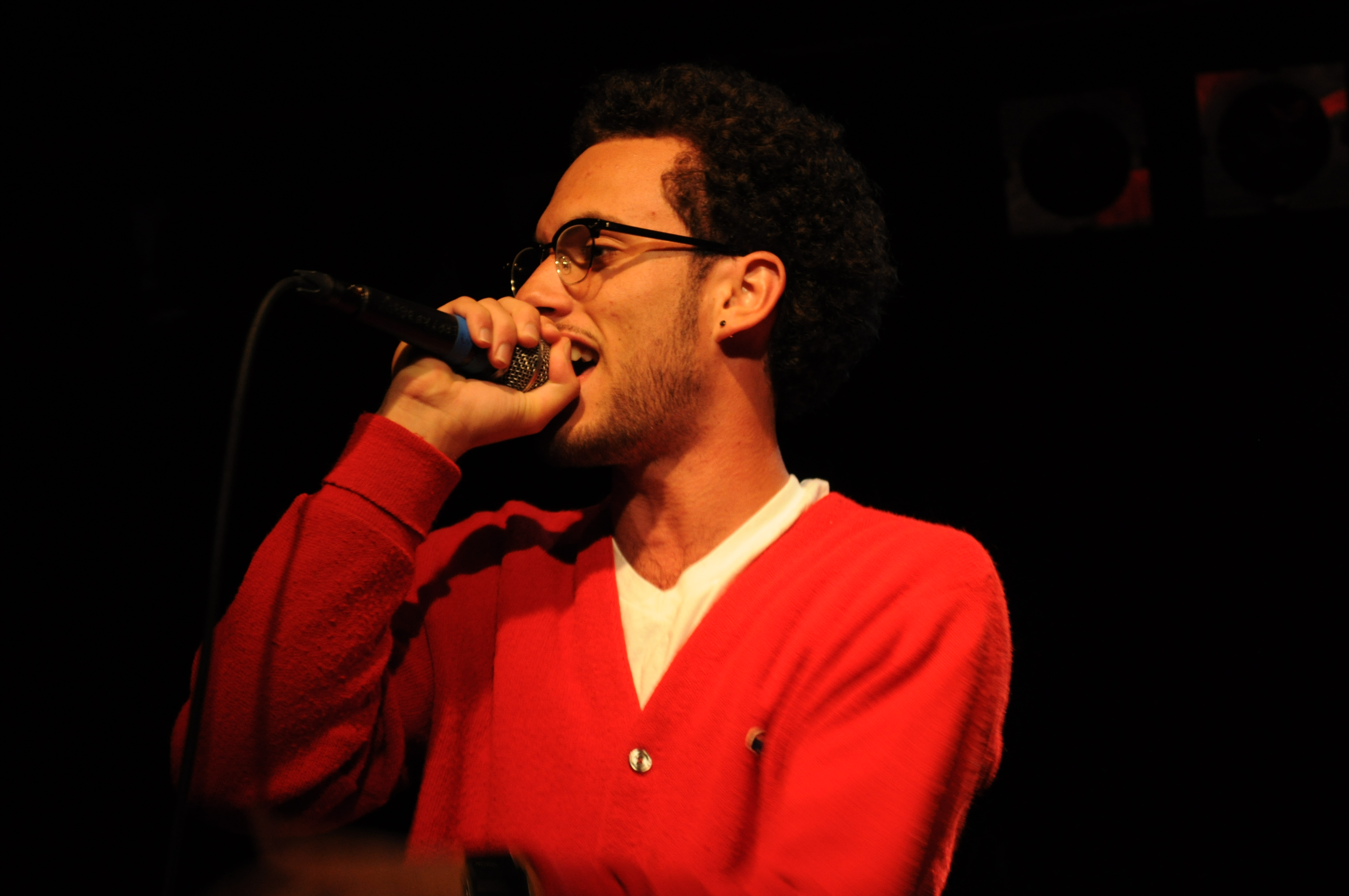

Background information
- Also known as: Solzilla
- Born: Sol Alexandre Moravia-Rosenberg; December 7, 1988 (age 37)
- Origin: Seattle, Washington, United States
- Genres: Hip hop
- Occupation: Rapper
- Years active: 2008–present
- Label: Zilla Music
- Website: www.solsays.com

Sol Alexander Rosenberg (born December 7, 1988), better known as Sol or Solzilla, is an American hip hop artist. In 2012, he released his second studio album Yours Truly, which received critical acclaim and rose to number one on the iTunes U.S. Hip-Hop Albums Chart while also charting on Billboard's Heatseekers Chart. Sol has collaborated with other artists such as Macklemore, Blue Scholars, Grynch, and The Physics.

== Life and career ==
=== 1988-2008: Early life and career beginnings ===
Sol was born in Seattle, Washington, and is of Haitian descent through his mother and Jewish descent through his father, both of whom were public school teachers. He first began rapping during middle school with his cousin Ben Fodor (now known as mixed martial artist and real-life superhero Phoenix Jones), and further cultivated his musical aspirations while apprenticing at North Seattle’s Undercaste Studios.

=== 2009-2010: Debut album and Dear Friends EP series ===
Sol released his debut album The Ride independently in 2009, followed by three free EPs: Dear Friends, Vol. I, Vol. II, and Vol. III).

In 2010, Sol's EP Dear Friends, Vol. II reached KEXP's Hip-Hop Top 10 Chart, and his song "Dear Friends" was included in KUBE's Sound Session Best of 2010. In October 2010, Sol's song "So Damn High" climbed the charts on The Hype Machine, deadmau5, and Kings of Leon. His live in-studio performance on KEXP was covered in the Seattle Times.

Following the 2010 Haiti earthquake, Sol organized a benefit concert for Doctors Without Borders, generating $7,000.

=== 2011-2015: Global travels, Yours Truly album tops iTunes ===
Sol graduated from the University of Washington in 2011, and was awarded its Bonderman Fellowship that provided him the opportunity to travel the world for ten months.

On January 20, 2012, Sol independently released his second album Yours Truly, which quickly rose to #1 in the U.S. and #4 worldwide on the iTunes Hip-Hop Album charts, while also landing on Billboard's Heatseekers Chart. Following appearances at Live Nation's Sasquatch! Music Festival, a West Coast tour, and a sold-out show at Seattle's The Showbox, Sol then departed the U.S. in June 2012 on his ten-month fellowship around the globe, which spanned ten countries including Ethiopia, Uganda and South Africa. He returned to the U.S. in April 2013, and during an interview recalling his travels, he described, “It was very tiring both physically and mentally. Day-to-day trying to survive and also big-picture trying to understand what it is that you’re seeing and trying to process that.”

Sol was recognized in May 2013 by XXL in its "Rappers You Should Know" article. Later in September 2013, he released an EP titled Eyes Open.

In 2015, Sol released two new singles, "People" and "Ain't Gon' Stop". Both songs were accompanied by music videos, and served as a prelude to a new album planned for the following year.

=== 2016-present: The Headspace Traveler ===
In February 2016, Sol released two music videos, "See the End" and "Happiness", and announced his plans to release a third studio album titled The Headspace Traveler. The Headspace Traveler was released on March 4, 2016, followed by a tour across the United States and Canada.

== Discography ==
Albums

- The Ride (2009)
- Yours Truly (2012)
- The Headspace Traveler (2016)
- Soon Enough (2019)
- Live at the Showbox (2019)
- Supply Pack (2022)
- It Ain't Pretty But It's Beautiful (2025)

EPs

- Murda on the Mic (2008)
- Dear Friends, Vol. 1 (2009)
- Dear Friends, Vol. 2 (2010)
- Dear Friends, Vol. 3 (2011)
- Eyes Open (2013)

Singles

- "People / Pages " (2015)
- "Ain't Gon' Stop" (2015)
- "If You Don't Call" (2017)
- "The Plug" (2018)

Guest appearances

- Kublakai & Slouch - "Appreciation" from Lights for the Dark Nights (2009)
- Kyle Lucas & Captain Midnite - "The New Light" from I Brought Dead Flowers to a Funeral (2009)
- Rockwell Powers & DJ Phinisey - "New Heights" from Kings & Comics (2010)
- Brothers from Another - "New Easy Lift" from Two Weeks Vacation (2010)
- Grynch - "All I Wanna Do" from Timeless (2011)
- Kublakai - "Like It's Out Last Day" from The Basics 2 (2011)
- Wizdom & Epidemmik - "That's Nice" from Unearthed (2011)
- KnowMads - "Clarity" from The Knewbook (2012)
- Grynch - "I'm Good" from Perspective (2012)
- Brothers from Another - "Pike & Broadway" from Tacos on Broadway (2013)
- Dave B - "Boathouse" (2014)
- Amp Live - "The Formula" from Headphone Concerto (2014)
- K.Flay - "Make Me Fade (Remix)" (2014)
- Sam Lachow - "Action Figures (Remix)" (2014)
- Brothers from Another - "Hanging Out" from This Summer (2015)
- Markis Precise - "Ride or Die" from The Feeling of Flying (2015)
