= Brad Smith (racing driver) =

American racing driver (born 1968)

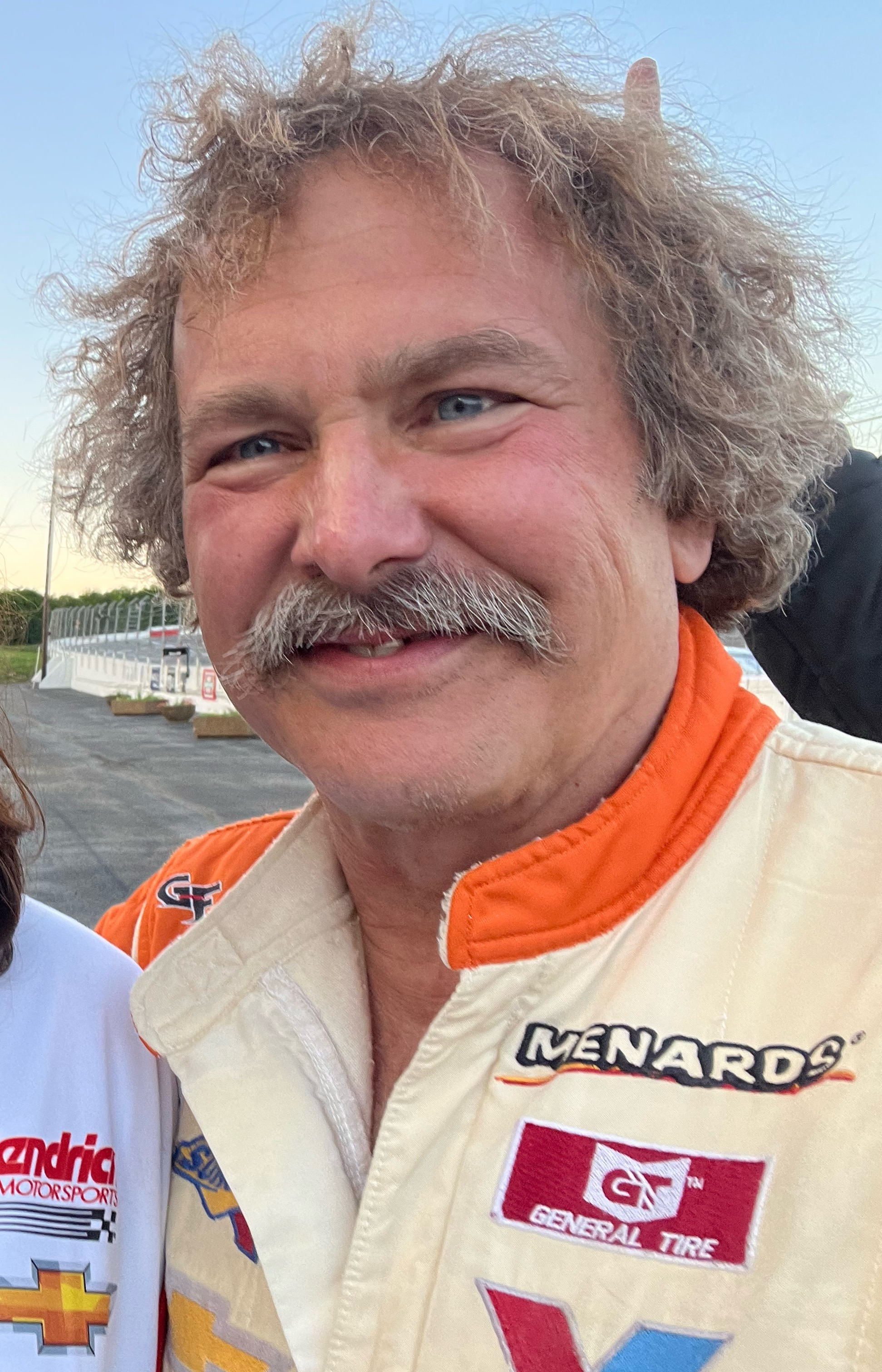
- Smith before the race at Fairgrounds Speedway in 2024
- Born: Bradley Smith; October 9, 1968 (age 58); Shelby Township, Michigan, U.S.

ARCA Menards Series career
- 482 races run over 33 years
- ARCA no., team: No. 48 (Brad Smith Motorsports)
- Best finish: 5th (2021)
- First race: 1988 Stewart-Warner Track Force 150 (Rockford)
- Last race: 2026 Menards 150 (Kansas)
Wins	Top tens	Poles
0	3	0

ARCA Menards Series East career
- 40 races run over 7 years
- ARCA East no., team: No. 48 (Brad Smith Motorsports)
- Best finish: 5th (2022)
- First race: 2020 Herr's Potato Chips 200 (Toledo)
- Last race: 2026 Bush's Best 200 (Bristol)
Wins	Top tens	Poles
0	1	0

ARCA Menards Series West career
- 5 races run over 5 years
- ARCA West no., team: No. 48 (Brad Smith Motorsports)
- Best finish: 63rd (2021)
- First race: 2021 General Tire 150 (Phoenix)
- Last race: 2026 General Tire 150 (Phoenix)
Wins	Top tens	Poles
0	0	0
- Statistics up to date as of September 25, 2026.

Bradley Smith (born October 9, 1958) is an American professional stock car racing driver who competes full-time in the ARCA Menards Series, driving the No. 48 Ford Fusion for his team, Brad Smith Motorsports. Smith is a veteran of the series, having made over 400 starts in it since 1988. He made his debut in the ARCA Menards Series East in 2020 and ARCA Menards Series West in 2021, and he and his team have also competed part-time in those series since then. He is the older brother of fellow driver Jeff Smith.

== Racing career ==
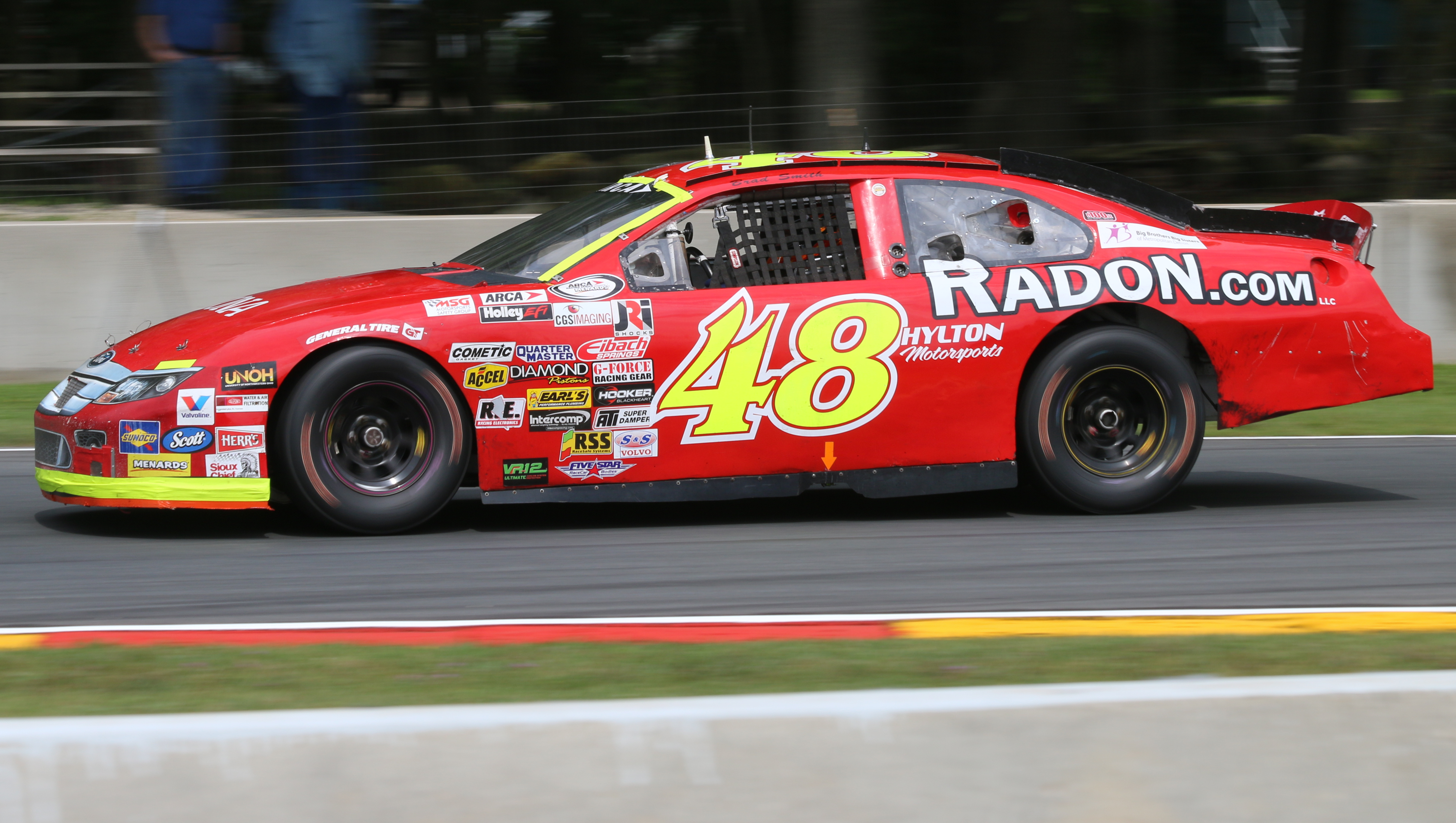
Smith at Road America in 2017

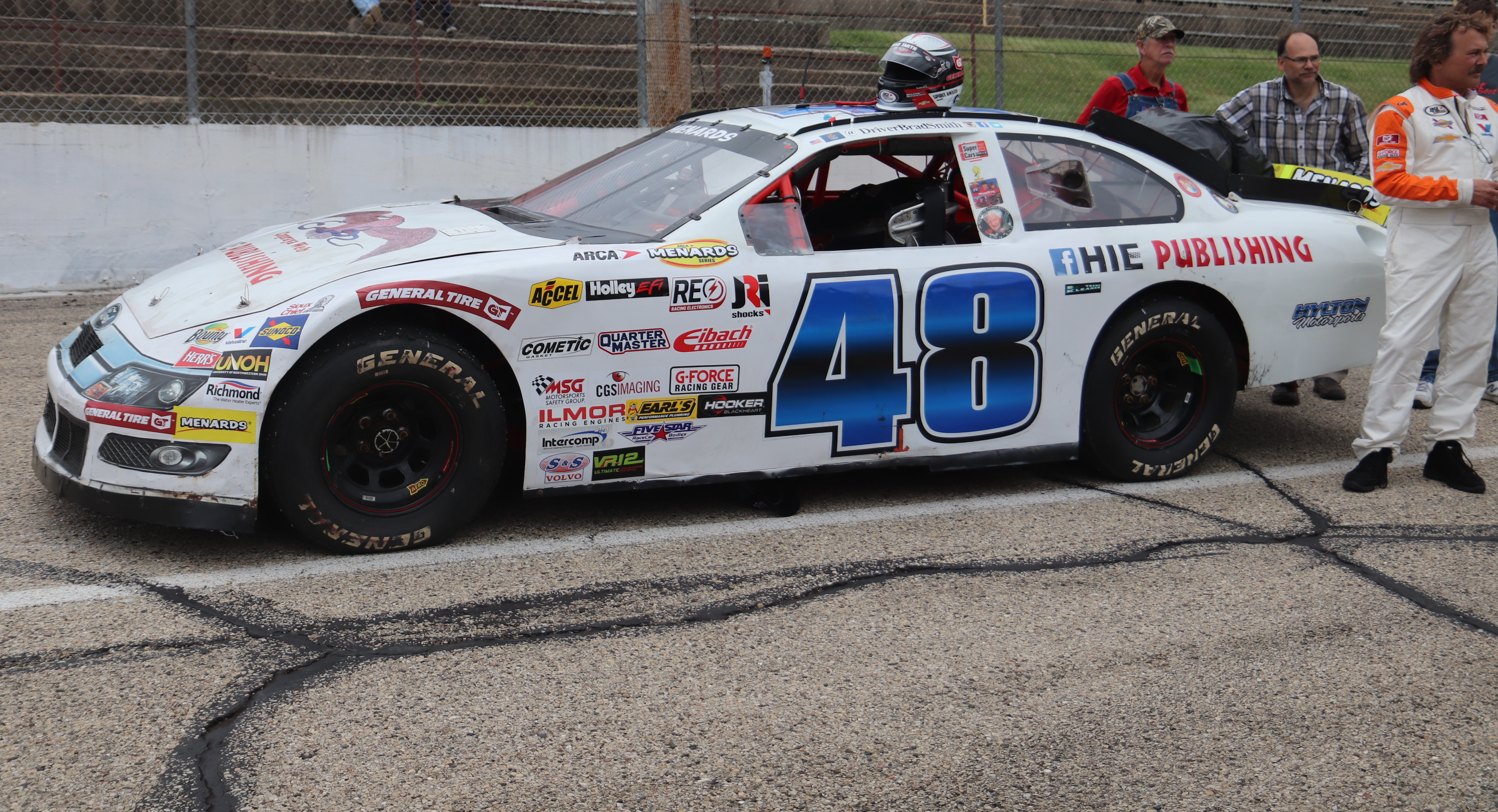
Smith at Madison in 2019

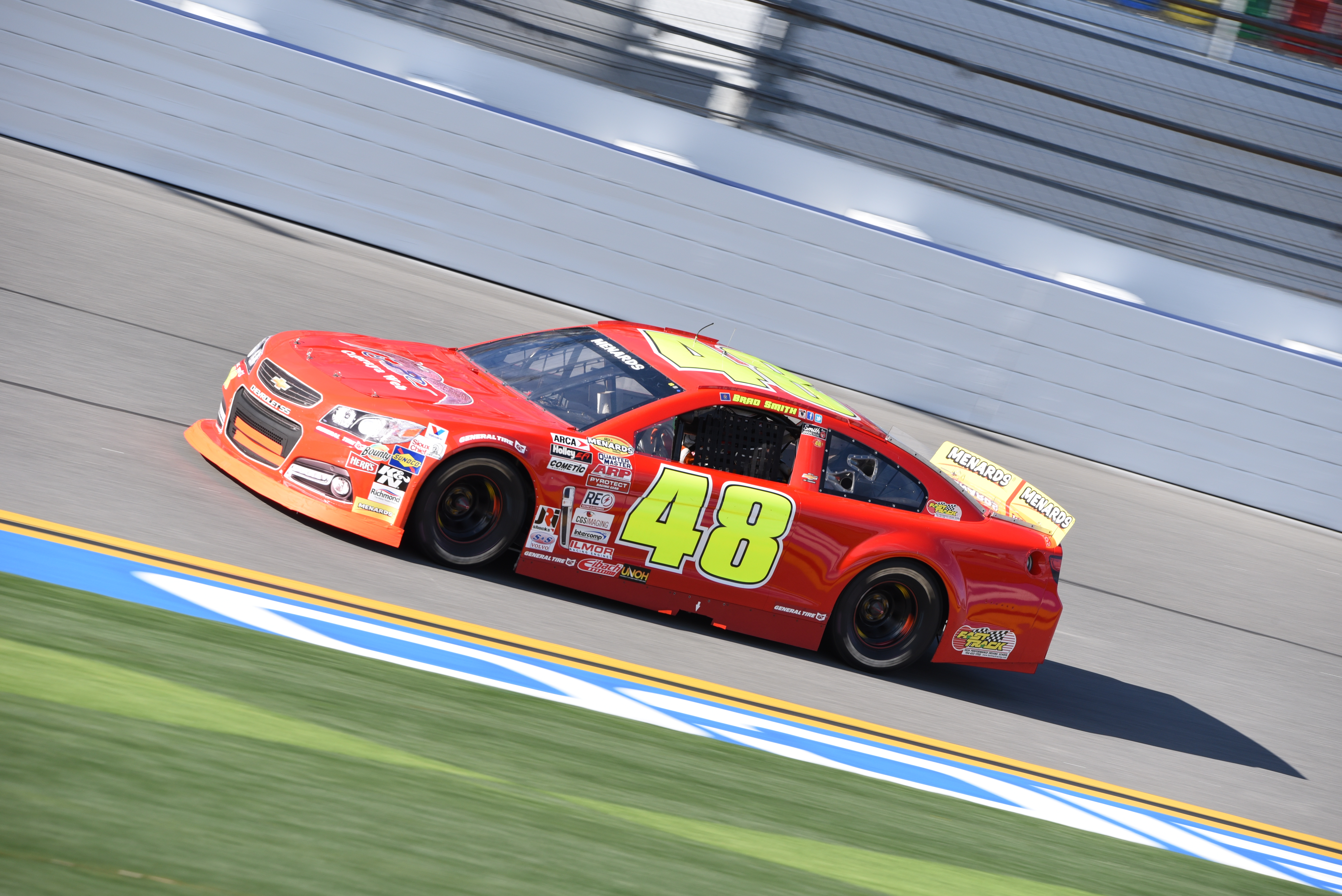
Smith at Daytona in 2020

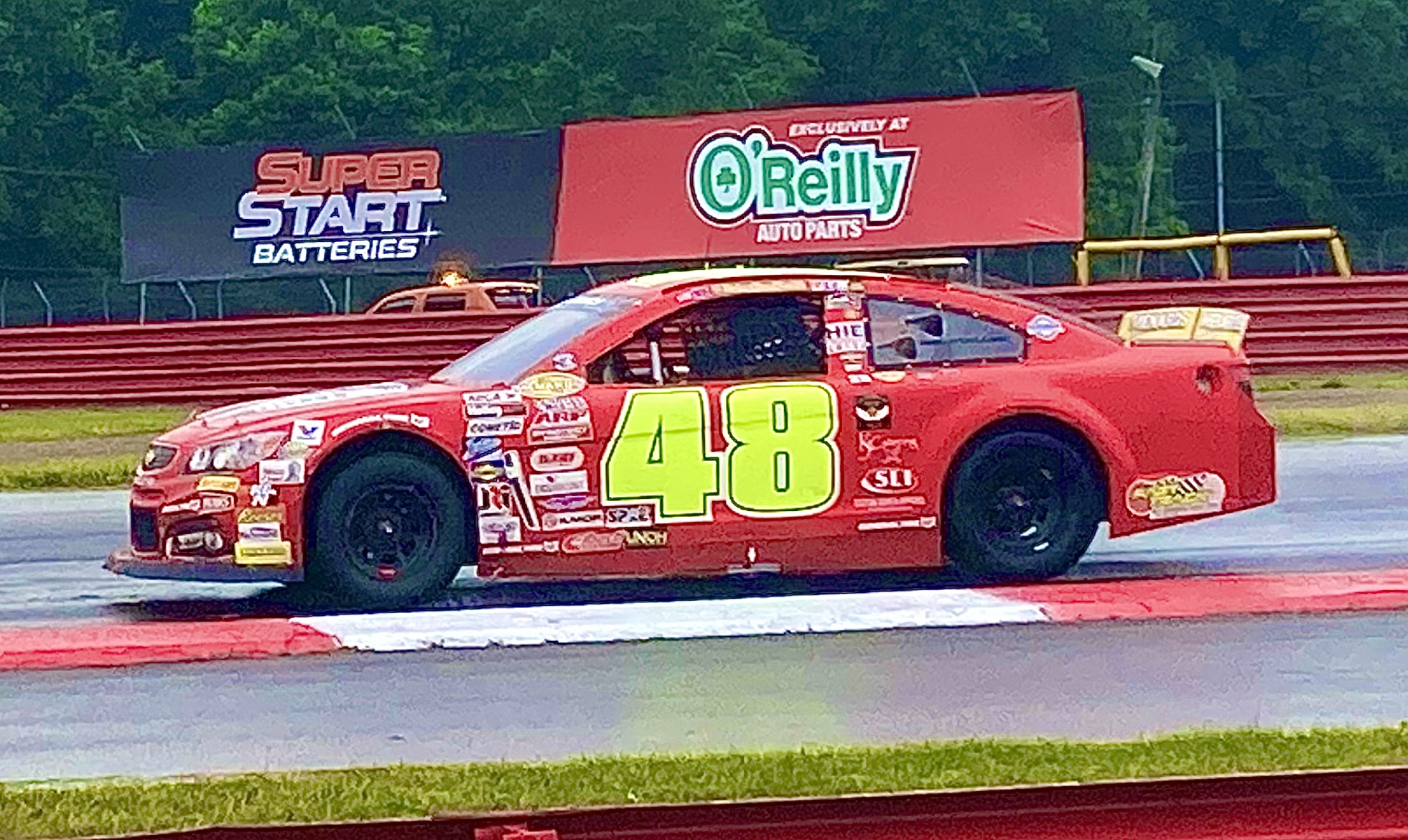
Smith at Mid-Ohio in 2022

An oil fire at Talladega Superspeedway in 2003 burned Smith's face and arms, resulting in a hospital stay. In the late 2000s, Smith hosted students from the University of Northwestern Ohio on his racing crew.

During the 2015 International Motorsports Hall of Fame 200 at Talladega, Austin Wayne Self spun in the tri-oval, and collected Smith's racecar, which went pinballing off both the outside and inside retaining walls. Press reports indicated that the crash fractured Smith's left ankle, although Smith later described the injury as a sprain. A planned full-time season was derailed, as Smith needed a wheelchair for five months following the crash. He returned for a full season the following year and received the General Tire Spirit Award.

Smith was driving for James Hylton Motorsports in 2018 when Hylton was killed in a hauler accident after the race at Talladega. The team completed the 2018 season and rebranded as Smith Brothers Racing, led by Smith and his brother Jeff. The group retained many of the same personnel from Hylton's team.

In 2020, Smith claimed his first series top-ten at Winchester Speedway; the finish came in his 363rd start. Despite not having much success in 2021, only finishing three races under power and missing Daytona, Smith was able to score his career best points finish, fifth.

In 2022, Smith would finish nine races under power and would earn his second career top-ten, tenth at Berlin despite retiring from the event with handling issues, and ended the season eighth in points. 2023 would see Smith complete five races and improve to sixth in points. Smith was only able to finish under power in three races in 2024. He also failed to qualify at Phoenix and withdrew from the race at Dover. His best result came in the season finale at Toledo, where he finished twelfth. He would also end the season twelfth in points.

In 2025, Smith scored his best finish in ARCA competition when he finished eighth in the ARCA Menards Series East race at Flat Rock Speedway. He finished sixth in the East Series standings, and finished ninth in the main ARCA series standings, where he got a top-ten finish at Springfield. He finished ninth in the points the following year in 2026.

== Personal life ==
Smith graduated from Utica Eisenhower High School. Smith was an engineer at General Motors before being laid off in 2019. He is currently an engineer at Nissan.

== Motorsports career results ==
=== Stock car career summary ===
Season	Series	Team	Races	Wins	Top 5	Top 10	Points	Position
1988	ARCA Permatex SuperCar Series	Smith Brothers Racing	12	0	0	0	N/A	16th
1991	ARCA Permatex SuperCar Series	Protocal Racing	1	0	0	0	N/A	147th
1995	ARCA Bondo/Mar-Hyde Series	Sands Racing	2	0	0	0	N/A	59th
1995	ARCA Bondo/Mar-Hyde Series	Wayne Peterson Racing	2	0	0	0	N/A	59th
1996	ARCA Bondo/Mar-Hyde Series	Wayne Peterson Racing	7	0	0	0	N/A	30th
1996	ARCA Bondo/Mar-Hyde Series	Ken Schrader Racing	1	0	0	0	N/A	30th
1998	ARCA Bondo/Mar-Hyde Series	N/A	0	0	0	0	0	N/A
1998	ARCA Bondo/Mar-Hyde Series	Southtown Motorsports	1	0	0	0	0	N/A
1998	ARCA Bondo/Mar-Hyde Series	Brad Smith Motorsports	1	0	0	0	0	N/A
1999	ARCA Bondo/Mar-Hyde Series	Brad Smith Motorsports	0	0	0	0	0	78th
1999	ARCA Bondo/Mar-Hyde Series	Wayne Peterson Racing	2	0	0	0	0	78th
2000	ARCA Bondo/Mar-Hyde Series	Brad Smith Motorsports	0	0	0	0	0	N/A
2001	ARCA Re/Max Series	Brad Smith Motorsports	19	0	0	0	2685	14th
2002	ARCA Re/Max Series	Brad Smith Motorsports	20	0	0	0	3275	16th
2003	ARCA Re/Max Series	Brad Smith Motorsports	19	0	0	0	3610	16th
2004	ARCA Re/Max Series	Brad Smith Motorsports	20	0	0	0	3735	14th
2005	ARCA Re/Max Series	Brad Smith Motorsports	19	0	0	0	3285	16th
2006	ARCA Re/Max Series	Brad Smith Motorsports	22	0	0	0	3760	14th
2007	ARCA Re/Max Series	Brad Smith Motorsports	21	0	0	0	3355	16th
2008	ARCA Re/Max Series	Brad Smith Motorsports	20	0	0	0	3360	17th
2009	ARCA Re/Max Series	Brad Smith Motorsports	20	0	0	0	3310	14th
2010	ARCA Racing Series	Brad Smith Motorsports	20	0	0	0	3145	16th
2011	ARCA Racing Series	Brad Smith Motorsports	17	0	0	0	2410	12th
2012	ARCA Racing Series	Brad Smith Motorsports	0	0	0	0	250	79th
2012	ARCA Racing Series	Wayne Peterson Racing	2	0	0	0	250	79th
2013	ARCA Racing Series	Roulo Brothers Racing	1	0	0	0	690	40th
2013	ARCA Racing Series	Josh Williams Motorsports	1	0	0	0	690	40th
2013	ARCA Racing Series	Hixson Motorsports	3	0	0	0	690	40th
2014	ARCA Racing Series	James Hylton Motorsports	14	0	0	0	2450	11th
2014	ARCA Racing Series	Wayne Peterson Racing	1	0	0	0	2450	11th
2015	ARCA Racing Series	James Hylton Motorsports	5	0	0	0	875	31st
2016	ARCA Racing Series	Max Force Racing	1	0	0	0	3445	6th
2016	ARCA Racing Series	Hixson Motorsports	1	0	0	0	3445	6th
2016	ARCA Racing Series	James Hylton Motorsports	16	0	0	0	3445	6th
2016	ARCA Racing Series	Wayne Peterson Racing	2	0	0	0	3445	6th
2017	ARCA Racing Series	James Hylton Motorsports	20	0	0	0	3530	8th
2018	ARCA Racing Series	James Hylton Motorsports	3	0	0	0	3250	9th
2018	ARCA Racing Series	Brad Smith Motorsports	16	0	0	0	3250	9th
2019	ARCA Menards Series	Brad Smith Motorsports	19	0	0	0	3480	7th
2020	ARCA Menards Series East	Brad Smith Motorsports	4	0	0	0	151	11th
2020	ARCA Menards Series	Brad Smith Motorsports	19	0	0	1	624	6th
2021	ARCA Menards Series West	Brad Smith Motorsports	1	0	0	0	18	63rd
2021	ARCA Menards Series East	Brad Smith Motorsports	4	0	0	0	146	14th
2021	ARCA Menards Series	Brad Smith Motorsports	18	0	0	0	567	5th
2021	ARCA Menards Series	Wayne Peterson Racing	1	0	0	0	567	5th
2022	ARCA Menards Series West	Brad Smith Motorsports	1	0	0	0	10	69th
2022	AECA Menards Series East	Brad Smith Motorsports	7	0	0	0	295	5th
2022	ARCA Menards Series	Brad Smith Motorsports	20	0	0	1	709	8th
2023	ARCA Menards Series West	Brad Smith Motorsports	1	0	0	0	14	73rd
2023	ARCA Menards Series East	Brad Smith Motorsports	6	0	0	0	236	9th
2023	ARCA Menards Series East	Kimmel Racing	1	0	0	0	236	9th
2023	ARCA Menards Series	Brad Smith Motorsports	19	0	0	0	686	6th
2023	ARCA Menards Series	Kimmel Racing	1	0	0	0	686	6th
2024	ARCA Menards Series West	Brad Smith Motorsports	0	0	0	0	0	N/A
2024	ARCA Menards Series East	Brad Smith Motorsports	6	0	0	0	172	18th
2024	ARCA Menards Series	Brad Smith Motorsports	18	0	0	0	523	12th
2025	ARCA Menards Series West	Brad Smith Motorsports	1	0	0	0	11	82nd
2025	ARCA Menards Series East	Brad Smith Motorsports	8	0	0	1	293	6th
2025	ARCA Menards Series	Brad Smith Motorsports	19	0	0	1	574	9th
2026	ARCA Menards Series West	Brad Smith Motorsports	1	0	0	0	5	89th
2026	ARCA Menards Series East	Brad Smith Motorsports	4	0	0	0	75	33rd
2026	ARCA Menards Series	Brad Smith Motorsports	20	0	0	0	600	9th

=== ARCA Menards Series ===
(key) (Bold – Pole position awarded by qualifying time. Italics – Pole position earned by points standings or practice time. * – Most laps led.)

ARCA Menards Series results
Year	Team	No.	Make	1	2	3	4	5	6	7	8	9	10	11	12	13	14	15	16	17	18	19	20	21	22	23	24	25	AMSC	Pts	Ref
1988	Smith Brothers Racing	67	Chrysler	DAY	ATL	TAL; DNQ	FRS	PCS	ROC; 24	POC; 13	WIN; 16	KIL; 24	ACS; 17	SLM; 16	POC; 16	TAL; DNQ	DEL; 17	FRS; 14	ISF; 23	DSF; 20	SLM; 12	ATL							16th	-	
1991	Protocal Racing	40	Chrysler	DAY	ATL	KIL	TAL	TOL	FRS	POC	MCH	KIL	FRS	DEL	POC	TAL	HPT	MCH; DNQ	ISF	TOL	DSF	TWS; 27	ATL						147th	-	
1995	Sands Racing	43	Pontiac	DAY; 20	ATL; 28																								59th	-	
1995	Wayne Peterson Racing	06	Pontiac			TAL; 42	FIF	KIL	FRS	MCH; 16	I80	MCS	FRS	POC	POC	KIL	FRS	SBS	LVL	ISF	DSF	SLM	WIN	ATL; DNQ					59th	-	
1996	Wayne Peterson Racing	06	Pontiac	DAY; DNQ	ATL; 20	SLM	TAL; 34	FIF; 25	LVL	CLT; 31	CLT; 20	KIL	FRS	POC															30th	-	
1996	Wayne Peterson Racing	06	Chevy												MCH; 31	FRS	TOL	POC; 30											30th	-	
1996	Ken Schrader Racing	51	Chevy																MCH; 28	INF	SBS	ISF	DSF	KIL	SLM	WIN	CLT	ATL	30th	-	
1998	Info not available			DAY; DNQ	ATL	SLM	CLT	MEM	MCH																				NA	0	
1998	Southtown Motorsports	9	Ford							POC; 31	SBS	TOL	PPR	POC	KIL	FRS	ISF	ATL	DSF	SLM			CLT; DNQ	TAL; DNQ	ATL				NA	0	
1998	Brad Smith Motorsports	26	Ford																		TEX; 19	WIN							NA	0	
1999	Brad Smith Motorsports	26	Ford	DAY; DNQ	ATL; DNQ	SLM	AND	CLT	MCH; DNQ	POC	TOL	SBS	BLN	POC; DNQ															78th	-	
1999	Wayne Peterson Racing	06	Pontiac												KIL; 28	FRS; 26	FLM	ISF	WIN	DSF	SLM	CLT	TAL	ATL					78th	-	
2000	Brad Smith Motorsports	26	Ford	DAY; DNQ	SLM	AND	CLT; DNQ	KIL	FRS	MCH; DNQ	POC; DNQ	TOL	KEN	BLN	POC	WIN	ISF	KEN	DSF	SLM	CLT	TAL	ATL						NA	-	
2001	Brad Smith Motorsports	26	Ford	DAY; DNQ	NSH; 37	WIN	SLM	GTY				MCH; 32															TAL; DNQ		14th	2685	
2001	Brad Smith Motorsports	26	Chevy						KEN; 40	CLT; 37	KAN; 35		POC; 24	MEM; 33	GLN; 22	KEN; 37	MCH; 38	POC; 38	NSH; 26	ISF; 29	CHI; 27	DSF; 25	SLM; 23	TOL; 21	BLN; 21	CLT; 25		ATL; 23	14th	2685	
2002	Brad Smith Motorsports	26	Ford	DAY; DNQ					CLT; 30			MCH; 28			KEN; 24		POC; 23	NSH; 21			DSF; 31	CHI; 19	SLM; 29	TAL; 38	CLT; 32				16th	3275	
2002	Brad Smith Motorsports	26	Chevy		ATL; 40	NSH; DNQ	SLM; 27	KEN; 27		KAN; 19	POC; 23		TOL; 33	SBO; 28		BLN; 23			ISF; 18	WIN; 12									16th	3275	
2003	Brad Smith Motorsports	26	Ford	DAY; DNQ	ATL; 22	NSH; 29			KEN; 26	CLT; 28		KAN; 14	MCH; 21	LER; 25	POC; 16	POC; 15	NSH; 22	ISF; 19	WIN; 21	DSF; 28	CHI; 13	SLM; 23	TAL; QL^{†}	CLT; DNQ	SBO; 32				16th	3610	
2003	Brad Smith Motorsports	26	Chevy				SLM; 18	TOL; 23			BLN; 27																		16th	3610	
2004	Brad Smith Motorsports	26	Ford	DAY; 32	NSH; 16	SLM; 20	KEN; 16	TOL; 20	CLT; 35	KAN; 14	POC; 21	MCH; 28	SBO; 20	BLN; 22	KEN; 27	GTW; 18	POC; 17	LER; 19	NSH; DNQ	ISF; 15	TOL; 29	DSF; 16	CHI; DNQ	SLM; 16	TAL; 32				14th	3735	
2005	Brad Smith Motorsports	26	Ford	DAY; DNQ	NSH; DNQ	SLM; DNQ	KEN; 19	TOL; DNQ	LAN; 20		POC; 12	MCH; 38	KAN; 39	KEN; 23	BLN; 22	POC; 17			NSH; 28	MCH; 25			DSF; 35	CHI; 21		TAL; 40			16th	3285	
2005	Brad Smith Motorsports	26	Pontiac							MIL; 25							GTW; 25	LER; 24			ISF; 23	TOL; 29			SLM; 23				16th	3285	
2006	Brad Smith Motorsports	26	Ford	DAY; DNQ	NSH; 31	SLM; 20	WIN; 22	KEN; 31	TOL; 34	POC; 18	MCH; 32	KAN; 18	KEN; 22	BLN; 29	POC; 23	GTW; 30	NSH; 24	MCH; 26	ISF; 15	MIL; 24	TOL; 22	DSF; 17	CHI; 26	SLM; 18	TAL; 15	IOW; 20			14th	3750	
2007	Brad Smith Motorsports	26	Ford	DAY; 19	USA; 30	NSH; 31	SLM; 19	KAN; 26	WIN; 15	KEN; 28	TOL; 29	IOW; 29	POC; 31	MCH; 29	BLN; 28	KEN; 35	POC; 40	NSH; 25	ISF; 21	MIL; 19	GTW; 25	DSF; 31	CHI; 23	SLM; 22	TAL; DNQ	TOL; DNQ			16th	3355	
2008	Brad Smith Motorsports	26	Dodge	DAY; 29																									17th	3360	
2008	Brad Smith Motorsports	26	Ford		SLM; 18	IOW; 25	KAN; 38	CAR; 32	KEN; 27	TOL; 23	POC; 22	MCH; 30	CAY; 15	KEN; 25	BLN; 23	POC; 28	NSH; 26	ISF; 23	DSF; 33	CHI; 23	SLM; 16	NJE; 28		TOL; 19					17th	3360	
2008	Brad Smith Motorsports	26	Chevy																				TAL; DNQ						17th	3360	
2009	Brad Smith Motorsports	26	Ford	DAY; DNQ	SLM; 18	CAR; 29	TAL; 29	KEN; 24	TOL; 18	POC; 27	MCH; 26	MFD; 24	IOW; 25	KEN; 24	BLN; 29	POC; 35	ISF; 34	CHI; 31	TOL; 19	DSF; 21	NJE; 23	SLM; 18	KAN; 28	CAR; 31					14th	3310	
2010	Brad Smith Motorsports	26	Ford	DAY; 24	PBE; 27	SLM; 23	TEX; 30	TAL; 22	TOL; 18	POC; 16	MCH; 24	IOW; 21	MFD; 19	POC; 27	BLN; 24	NJE; 26	ISF; 28	CHI; 28	DSF; 30	TOL; 13	SLM; 22	KAN; 29							16th	3145	
2010	Brad Smith Motorsports	26	Chevy																				CAR; 41						16th	3145	
2011	Brad Smith Motorsports	26	Dodge	DAY	TAL; 32																								12th	2410	
2011	Brad Smith Motorsports	26	Ford			SLM; 25		NJE; 33	CHI; 26	POC; 22	MCH; 23	WIN; 24	BLN; 23	IOW; 33	IRP; DNQ	POC; 23	ISF; 19	MAD; 28	DSF; 32	SLM; 25	KAN; 27	TOL; 32							12th	2410	
2011	Brad Smith Motorsports	94	Ford				TOL; 28																						12th	2410	
2012	Brad Smith Motorsports	26	Ford	DAY; DNQ	MOB	SLM	TAL																						79th	250	
2012	Wayne Peterson Racing	0	Ford					TOL; DNQ	ELK	POC	MCH; 25	WIN	NJE	IOW	CHI; 27	IRP	POC	BLN	ISF	MAD	SLM	DSF	KAN						79th	250	
2013	Roulo Brothers Racing	17	Ford	DAY	MOB	SLM	TAL	TOL	ELK	POC	MCH	ROA	WIN	CHI	NJE	POC	BLN; 25	ISF	MAD										40th	690	
2013	Josh Williams Motorsports	02	Ford																	DSF; 32	IOW								40th	690	
2013	Hixson Motorsports	3	Chevy																			SLM; 27	KEN; 29	KAN; 29					40th	690	
2014	James Hylton Motorsports	48	Ford	DAY	MOB	SLM	TAL	TOL; 23	NJE; 16	POC	MCH; 17	ELK; 19	WIN; 18		IRP; 24	POC; 19	BLN; 18	ISF; 20	MAD; 19	DSF; 15	SLM; 22	KEN; 26	KAN; 19						11th	2450	
2014	Wayne Peterson Racing	00	Chevy											CHI; 25															11th	2450	
2015	James Hylton Motorsports	49	Ford	DAY; 22																									31st	875	
2015	James Hylton Motorsports	48	Ford		MOB; 15	NSH; 20	SLM; 17	TAL; 31	TOL	NJE	POC	MCH	CHI	WIN	IOW	IRP	POC	BLN	ISF	DSF	SLM	KEN	KAN						31st	875	
2016	Max Force Racing	23	Ford	DAY; 32																									6th	3445	
2016	Hixson Motorsports	2	Chevy		NSH; 30																								6th	3445	
2016	James Hylton Motorsports	48	Ford			SLM; 22		TOL; 23	NJE; 20	POC; 25	MCH; 19	MAD; 15	WIN; 14	IOW; 22			BLN; 13	ISF; 15	DSF; 12	SLM; 17		KEN; 18	KAN; 21						6th	3445	
2016	James Hylton Motorsports	2	Ford				TAL; 24																						6th	3445	
2016	Wayne Peterson Racing	31	Chevy												IRP; 33														6th	3445	
2016	James Hylton Motorsports	49	Ford													POC; 18													6th	3445	
2016	Wayne Peterson Racing	0	Chevy																		CHI; 30								6th	3445	
2017	James Hylton Motorsports	48	Ford	DAY; 17	NSH; 21	SLM; 17	TAL; 17	TOL; 17	ELK; 17	POC; 31	MCH; 20	MAD; 16	IOW; 17	IRP; 24	POC; 24	WIN; 19	ISF; 17	ROA; 24	DSF; 21	SLM; 21	CHI; 26	KEN; 26	KAN; 22						8th	3530	
2018	James Hylton Motorsports	48	Ford	DAY; 23	NSH; 22	SLM; Wth	TAL; 31																						9th	3250	
2018	Brad Smith Motorsports	48	Ford					TOL; 16	CLT; 30	POC; 20	MCH; 17	MAD; 14	GTW; 17	CHI; 22	IOW; 15	ELK; 17	POC; 22	ISF; 14	BLN; 16	DSF; 17	SLM; 20	IRP; 22	KAN; 25						9th	3250	
2019	Brad Smith Motorsports	48	Chevy	DAY; 19			TAL; 16			CLT; 23	POC; 15	MCH; 13		GTW; 15	CHI; 16		IOW; 17	POC; 16					KAN; 20						7th	3480	
2019	Brad Smith Motorsports	48	Ford		FIF; 16	SLM; 19		NSH; 20	TOL				MAD; 15			ELK; 19			ISF; 16	DSF; 16	SLM; 18	IRP; 19							7th	3480	
2020	Brad Smith Motorsports	48	Chevy	DAY; 31	PHO	TAL; 20	POC; 13	IRP; 17	KEN; 12	IOW; 19	KAN; 16	TOL; 13	TOL; 14	MCH; 12	DAY; 19	GTW; 19	L44; 13	TOL; 17	BRI; 25	WIN; 9	MEM; 15	ISF; 13	KAN; 15						6th	624	
2021	Brad Smith Motorsports	48	Chevy	DAY	PHO; 26	TAL; 29	KAN; 16	TOL; 11	CLT; 19	MOH; 16	POC; 16	ELK; 14	BLN; 14	IOW; 19	WIN; 16	GLN; 28	MCH; 11	ISF; 14	MLW; 22	DSF; 14	BRI; 24	SLM; 16							5th	567	
2021	Wayne Peterson Racing	06	Chevy																				KAN; 23						5th	567	
2022	Brad Smith Motorsports	48	Chevy	DAY; 28	PHO; 34	TAL; 22	KAN; 18	CLT; 14	IOW; 15	BLN; 10	ELK; 16	MOH; 22	POC; 17	IRP; 16	MCH; 16	GLN; 24	ISF; 21	MLW; 21	DSF; 11	KAN; 13	BRI; 24	SLM; 14	TOL; 15						8th	709	
2023	Brad Smith Motorsports	48	Chevy	DAY; 30		TAL; 19	KAN; 24	CLT; 20		ELK; 18						GLN; 20	ISF; 18		DSF; 11	KAN; 14	BRI; 30	SLM; 16							6th	686	
2023	Brad Smith Motorsports	48	Ford		PHO; 30				BLN; 15		MOH; 21	IOW; 15	POC; 17	MCH; 19	IRP; 21								TOL; 16						6th	686	
2023	Kimmel Racing	69	Ford															MLW; 20											6th	686	
2024	Brad Smith Motorsports	48	Ford	DAY; 22		TAL; 30	DOV; Wth	KAN; 23	CLT; 26	IOW; 26	MOH; 24	BLN; 18	IRP; 31	SLM; 21	ELK; 20	MCH; 21	ISF; 19	MLW; 22	DSF; 22	GLN; 28	BRI; 32	KAN; 25	TOL; 12						12th	523	
2024	Brad Smith Motorsports	48	Chevy		PHO; DNQ																								12th	523	
2025	Brad Smith Motorsports	48	Ford	DAY; Wth	PHO; 33	TAL; 26	KAN; 23	CLT; 27	MCH; 21	BLN; 15	ELK; 18	LRP; 24	DOV; 20	IRP; 26	IOW; 27	GLN; 27	ISF; 9	MAD; 19	DSF; 16	BRI; 22	SLM; 17	KAN; 24	TOL; 18						9th	574	
2026	Brad Smith Motorsports	48	Ford	DAY; 25	PHO; 39	KAN; 26	TAL; 22	GLN; 33	TOL; 17	MCH; 29	POC; 22	BER; 18	ELK; 16	CHI; 25	LRP; 27	IRP; 24	IOW; 29	ISF; 18	MAD; 21	DSF; 23	SLM; 16	BRI; 31	KAN; 19						9th	600	
^{†} - Qualified but replaced by Paul Menard due to fire of his No. 26 car.

==== ARCA Menards Series East ====
ARCA Menards Series East results
Year	Team	No.	Make	1	2	3	4	5	6	7	8	AMSEC	Pts	Ref
2020	Brad Smith Motorsports	48	Chevy	NSM	TOL; 15	DOV	TOL; 17	BRI; 25	FIF; 18			11th	151	
2021	Brad Smith Motorsports	48	Chevy	NSM	FIF	NSV	DOV	SNM; 15	IOW; 19	MLW; 22	BRI; 24	14th	146	
2022	Brad Smith Motorsports	48	Chevy	NSM; 15	FIF; 14	DOV; 11	NSV; 13	IOW; 15	MLW; 21	BRI; 24		5th	295	
2023	Brad Smith Motorsports	48	Ford	FIF; Wth	DOV; 11			IOW; 15	IRP; 21			9th	236	
2023	Brad Smith Motorsports	48	Chevy			NSV; 12	FRS; 13				BRI; 30	9th	236	
2023	Kimmel Racing	69	Ford							MLW; 20		9th	236	
2024	Brad Smith Motorsports	48	Ford	FIF; Wth	DOV; Wth	NSV; 16	FRS; 15	IOW; 26	IRP; 31	MLW; 22	BRI; 32	18th	172	
2025	Brad Smith Motorsports	48	Ford	FIF; 21	CAR; 24	NSV; 11	FRS; 8	DOV; 20	IRP; 26	IOW; 27	BRI; 22	6th	293	
2026	Brad Smith Motorsports	48	Ford	HCY; Wth	CAR; Wth	NSV	TOL; 17	IRP; 24	FRS; Wth	IOW; 29	BRI; 31	33rd	75	

==== ARCA Menards Series West ====
ARCA Menards Series West results
Year	Team	No.	Make	1	2	3	4	5	6	7	8	9	10	11	12	13	AMSWC	Pts	Ref
2021	Brad Smith Motorsports	48	Chevy	PHO; 26	SON	IRW	CNS	IRW	PIR	LVS	AAS	PHO					63rd	18	
2022	Brad Smith Motorsports	48	Chevy	PHO; 34	IRW	KCR	PIR	SON	IRW	EVG	PIR	AAS	LVS	PHO			69th	10	
2023	Brad Smith Motorsports	48	Ford	PHO; 30	IRW	KCR	PIR	SON	IRW	SHA	EVG	AAS	LVS	MAD	PHO		73rd	14	
2024	Brad Smith Motorsports	48	Chevy	PHO; DNQ	KER	PIR	SON	IRW	IRW	SHA	TRI	MAD	AAS	KER	PHO		N/A	0	
2025	Brad Smith Motorsports	48	Ford	KER	PHO; 33	TUC	CNS	KER	SON	TRI	PIR	AAS	MAD	LVS	PHO		82nd	11	
2026	Brad Smith Motorsports	48	Ford	KER	PHO; 39	TUC	SHA	CNS	TRI	SON	PIR	AAS	MAD	LVS	PHO	KER	89th	5	
