= John DiGiorgio =

American football player (born 1982)

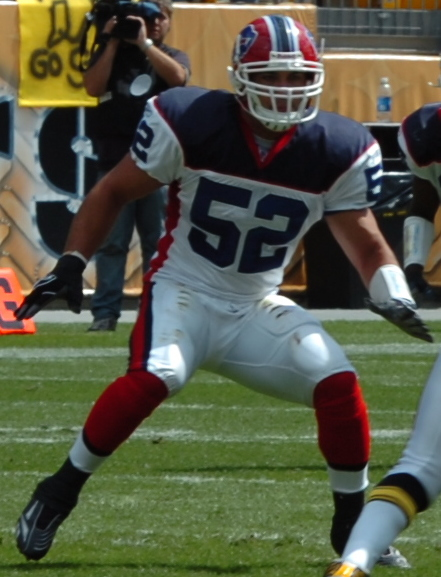
- DiGiorgio with the Buffalo Bills in 2007

No. 96, 52
- Position: Linebacker

Personal information
- Born: June 29, 1982 (age 44); Shelby Charter Township, Michigan, U.S.
- Listed height: 6 ft 2 in (1.88 m)
- Listed weight: 229 lb (104 kg)

Career information
- High school: Eisenhower (Shelby Charter Township)
- College: Saginaw Valley State
- NFL draft: 2006: undrafted

Career history
- Buffalo Bills (2006–2008)

Career NFL statistics
- Games played: 34
- Total tackles: 124
- Sacks: 2
- Fumble recoveries: 2
- Pass deflections: 6
- Interceptions: 1
- Stats at Pro Football Reference

John DiGiorgio (born June 29, 1982) is an American former professional football player who was a linebacker for the Buffalo Bills of the National Football League (NFL). He was signed by the Bills as an undrafted free agent in 2006. He played college football for the Saginaw Valley State Cardinals.

== Professional career ==
DiGiorgio was signed by the Bills as an undrafted free agent in 2006. That year, he was the only undrafted free agent to make the Bills' 53-man roster. He overcame a lot of adversity, and added depth to a (during the time) weak defense. As a rookie in 2006, DiGiorgio played in 12 games and made eight tackles. But when London Fletcher departed for Washington after the season, it gave DiGiorgio a chance to compete for the starting job.

DiGiorgio had a big year for the Bills in 2007. He played in all 16 games—the final 13 as a starter at middle linebacker—and was second on the team with 113 tackles. John took full advantage of Paul Posluszny's injury, and filled in as the middle linebacker in the 2007 season. As John filled in for the injured starting linebacker he did an exceptional job. His "blue-collar" work-ethics made him the 2007 Buffalo fan favorite. With Buffalo being a predominate blue-collared environment the fans took notice of John being a natural underdog in the NFL with a great work-ethic. The combination of hard-work and Buffalo natives recognizing his background, adversities, and doing an exceptional job as the backup MLB sparked the Buffalo fans support. He also had two fumble recoveries and an interception. The Bills were in the playoff hunt late in the season, but they lost their final three games to finish with a 7–9 record.

Among DiGiorgio's highlights was his sack of New England Patriots' quarterback Tom Brady in Week 3 for his first career sack. He also intercepted a pass from Tony Romo in a 25–24 loss to the Dallas Cowboys. However, the following season, DiGiorgio appeared in six games primarily on special teams before tearing a ligament in his right knee while blocking on a punt return in the second quarter of a 23–14 win over San Diego in Week 7.

He was waived by the Buffalo Bills on July 25, 2009, for failing his physical after having season-ending surgery to repair bone damage in his right knee.

He retired on July 25, 2010.

As of June 20th, 2025, he teaches Youth PE and coaches the Junior Varsity football team at Chippewa Valley High School.

== Personal life ==
DiGiorgio is an Italian-American.

John DiGiorgio played high school football as a Linebacker and Running Back for Utica Eisenhower High school. He led Eisenhower to the state finals in 1999 and 2000 and was named to the All-State Team. As a senior, John was a "Dream Team Pick" and was selected to play for the East Squad in the 2001 Michigan High School All-Star Game.

DiGiorgio played college football at Saginaw Valley State University where he pursued his teaching degree and teaching certification. In 2005, John was named to the All-American Team by the American Football Coaches Association, Linebacker of the Year by Don Hansen's Football Services, GLIAC [Great Lakes Intercollegiate Athletic Conference] Player of the Year and First Team All-GLIAC. While playing for the Saginaw Valley, DiGiorgio broke the all time team record for career tackles and compiled 462 tackles. John finished his collegiate football career 3rd All-Time in NCAA Division II history for career tackles. In 2006, John was selected to play in the 2006 Cactus Bowl.

John DiGiorgio was a student teacher at Siebert Elementary School in Midland. DiGiorgio, a former All-American at Saginaw Valley State University, helped out Bob Wellman in his physical education classes. He also delivered big hits that drew fans to create catch phrase for his incredibly astonishing, punishing, blows delivered to opposing players: "It's not delivery, it's Digiorgio!" During the 2008 off-season, DiGiorgio began to student-teach physical education at Siebert Elementary in Midland, Michigan.

In July 2010, he accepted a job teaching Physical Education and coaching at Chippewa Valley High School in Clinton Township, Michigan. During the summer of 2014, John returned to his old team at Eisenhower High School, where he served as the Eagles' offensive coordinator.

John DiGiorgio lives in Macomb County with his wife and children where he is an active member of the community.
