= Yates Cider Mill =

Cider mill in Rochester, Michigan USA

Coordinates: 42.6730°N 83.0947°W

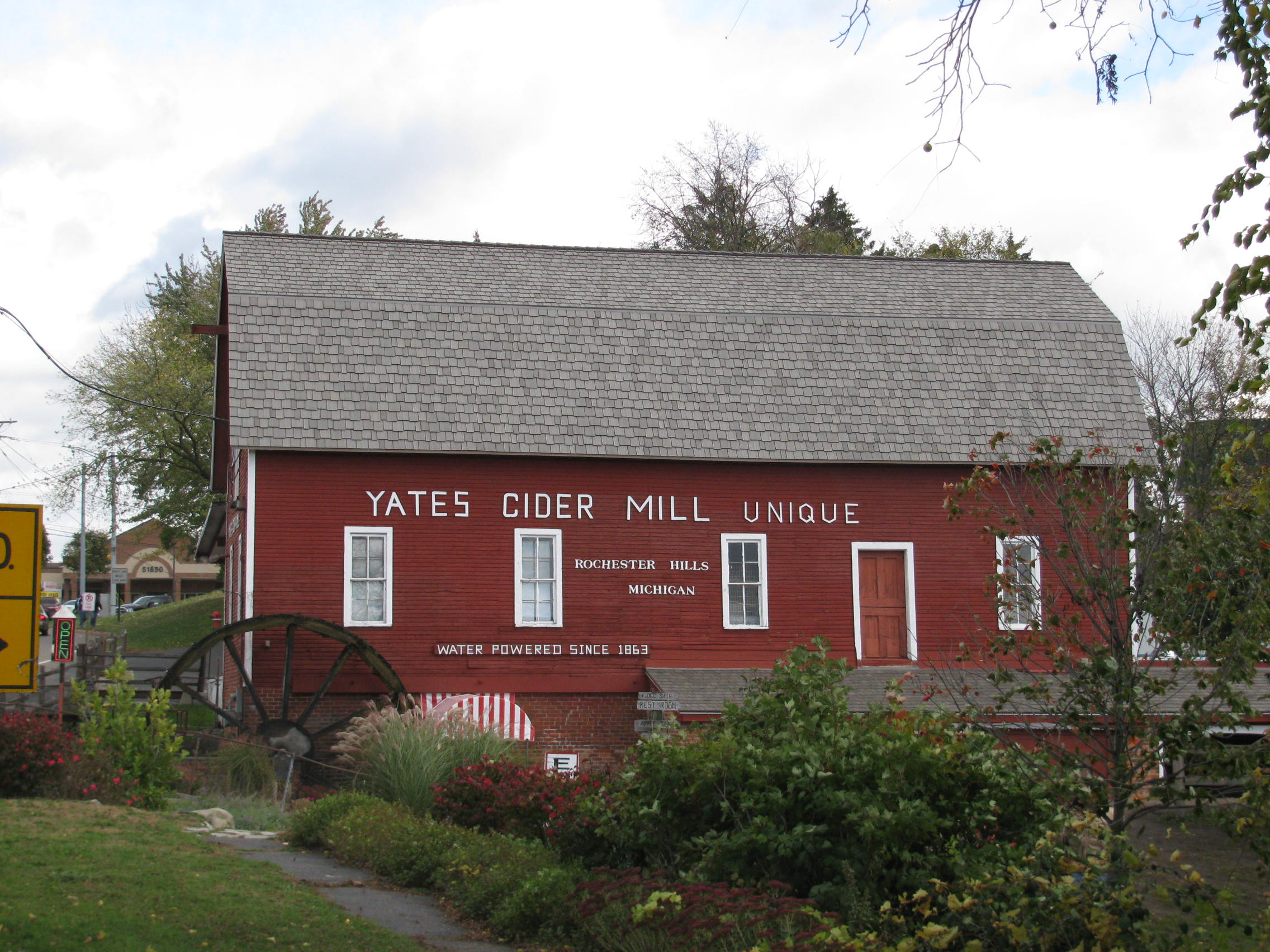
- Location: Rochester, Michigan and Shelby Charter TWP
- Owner: Mike and Katie Titus

Construction
- Completed: 1864

Yates Cider Mill is a cider mill in Rochester, Michigan. The mill traces its roots to 1863, when it was known as Yates Grist Mill. In order for the mill to utilize water power, the Yates Dam was built. The Yates Mill became the Yates Cider Mill in 1876 when a cider press was installed into the existing water powered process and the Mill began producing apple cider. Custom apple pressing was done for local farmers, orchard owners and landowners who brought their apples to the Mill.

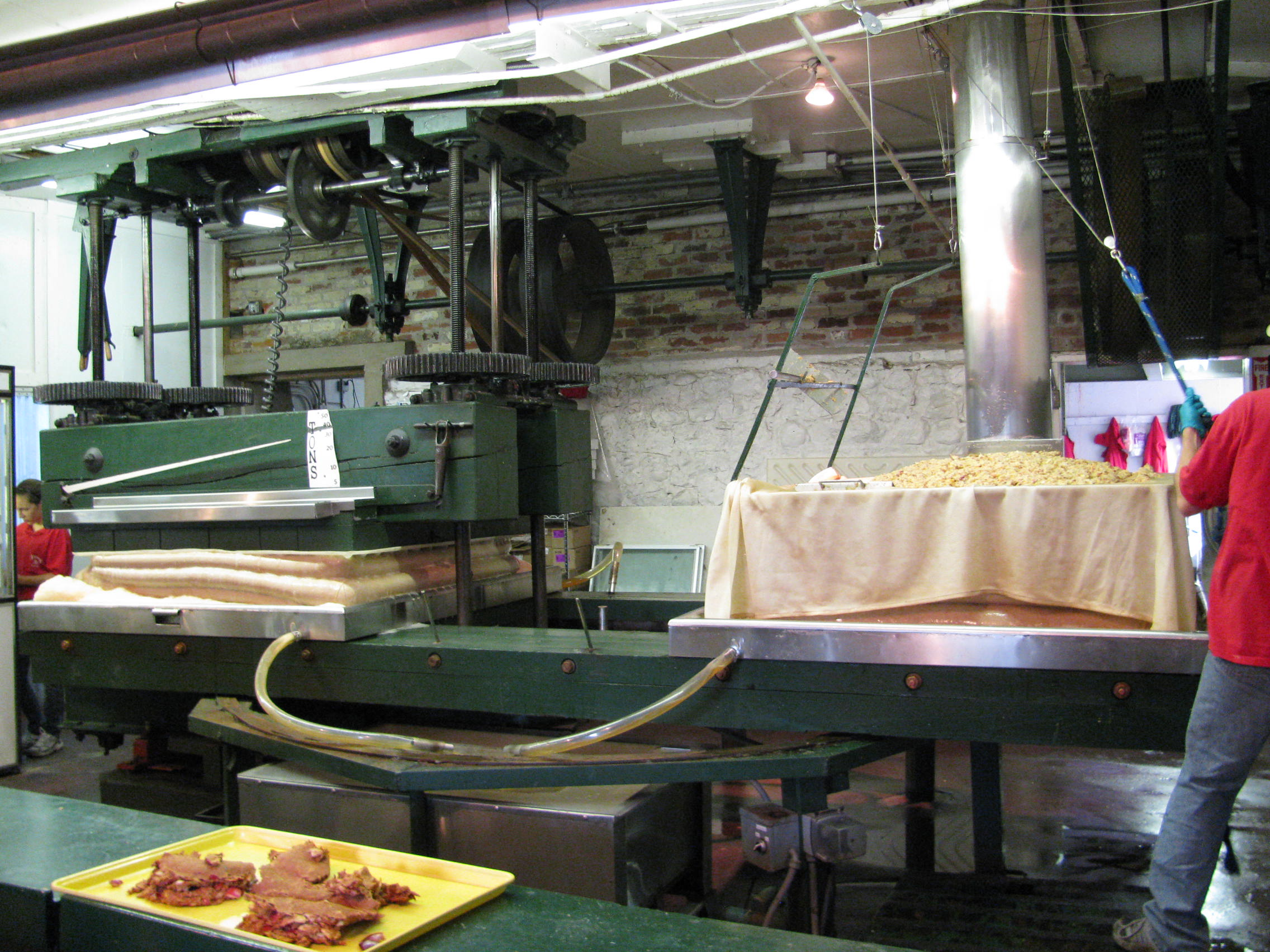
Apple press

In one autumn weekend.the mill juices over half a million apples and can produce 300 gallons of cider an hour.

In October 2009, Yates Cider Mill was featured on Food Network’s Unwrapped. It was a special behind-the-scenes episode entitled, “Fall Favorites".
