= James and Karla Murray =

American photographer duo

James and Karla Murray are American photographers. The husband and wife duo have photographed storefronts of small businesses in New York City and elsewhere. They have also constructed a sculptural installation based on their photographic work.

== Books ==
The Murrays have published two volumes of their photographic work, Store Front: The Face of Disappearing New York (2008, ISBN 978-1-58423-227-8) and Store Front II: A History Preserved: The Disappearing Face of New York (ISBN 978-1-58423-604-7). The New York Society Library awarded the New York City Book Award to the Murray's 2012 book, New York Nights.

in 2008, the Murray's were the subject of a documentary film, Store Front New York, directed by Greg DeLiso which was shown at the 2009 Red Hook Film Festival. In March 2019 the Murrays and some of the East Village storefronts they have done work about were the subject of a local piece on WNBC channel four's lifestyle program, New York Live; the pair took the reporter of the story, Joelle Garguilo on a walking tour.

== Exhibitions and permanent collections ==
In 2018, the Murrays created and exhibited an architectural assemblage created from storefronts they photographed. The work is named L.E.S. and was installed in Seward Park on the Lower East Side in Manhattan, New York City. Other exhibitions of their work have been held at Brooklyn Historical Society, Clic Gallery, Fotogalerie Im Blauen Haus, the Museum of Neon Art, and the New-York Historical Society.

Permanent collections of their work are housed at the Smithsonian Center for Folklife and Cultural Heritage and the New York Public Library. The Murray's received the 2015 Regina Kellerman Award by the Greenwich Village Society for Historic Preservation (GVSHP).

== See also ==
- Street photography
- Historic preservation
- Storefront
- Mom and pop stores
