= Peter Litvin =

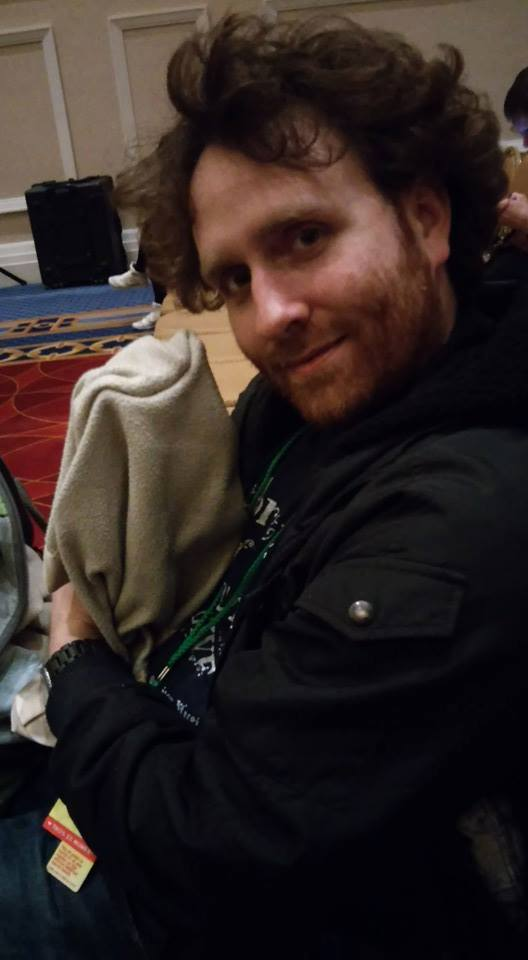

Background information
- Born: Peter Litvin; April 20, 1985 (age 41); Mount Clemens, Michigan, United States
- Genres: Alternative rock
- Occupations: Musician, music producer, songwriter, actor
- Instruments: Guitar, bass, keyboards, vocals
- Years active: 2006-present

Peter Litvin (born April 20, 1985) is an American music artist, actor, and songwriter based in New York City. Litvin is best known for his lead role as Hectic Knife in the film Hectic Knife, which was picked up for distribution by Troma Entertainment in 2016. He was discovered and mentored by music engineer Bob Ebeling who has worked with artists like Eminem, Rufus Wainwright and Phish. Litvin acted as a producer on JJ Brine's studio album President of Mozambique, and as a composer for Jeff Krulik's musical documentary, Heavy Metal Picnic, in 2010. Litvin has collaborated with writer & actor Trent Haaga on several short films. He is also the founder of Revolution Studios, a recording studio in New York City.

== Early life ==
Litvin was born in Mount Clemens, Michigan on April 20, 1985. At the age of 8, he began playing music on an old guitar. Soon he played music that he composed. As Litvin reached adolescence, his understanding of how music works were fine tuned as he worked with Scott Lyon. Litvin attended Eisenhower High School in Shelby Township, Michigan, where he befriended American filmmaker and long-time collaborator Greg DeLiso. He earned Associate of Arts degree from Macomb Community College in 2005. He received his Bachelor of Business Administration degree from Rochester College in 2006. Litvin relocated to Brooklyn, New York in 2008, and later to Los Angeles in 2019.

== Music career ==
Litvin started recording music at the early age of 12. Guided by producer Chuck Miller and Scott Lyon, Litvin began recording his own compositions using Multitrack recording software. At age 13 he started a band called Inner Stellar with Seth VanderVlucht, Matt Dewitt, and John Budgery. Litvin was the youngest member, the other members being 18. Litvin wrote the music for their debut album entitled Fish Hospital. At age 18 he was also the guitarist for Space Cake, a rock band featuring Jesse Wozniak, Chris Cundiff, and Kent Kohler. In 2006, he started recording other artists professionally and moved to New York City where he opened a recording studio, Revolution Studios, in 2008.

In 2008 Litvin also produced an EP called Prone to Wilting for Detroit-based artist Emily Rose. The EP was later included as part of the album Cocoon Stew in 2009.

In 2010, he worked with filmmaker Jeff Krulik, composing the score for his musical documentary Heavy Metal Picnic. He then worked with Greg DeLiso on DeLiso's next two projects, first composing the score for Canada's Best Kept Secret, a feature-length documentary about Canadian author and naturalist R.D. Lawrence. Litvin then worked with DeLiso on Fake Henrik Zetterberg, a 12-episode web series about the bumbling doppelgänger of Swedish NHL player Henrik Zetterberg.

Litvin worked with artist/musician JJ Brine in 2011–2012, producing the albums Code Cracker (2011) and President of Mozambique (2012, DrugLord Records). Litvin also briefly worked at Mike E. Clark's Electric Lab Studio in 2011.

From 2013 to 2016, Litvin studied jazz under the tutelage of modern jazz legends Ilya Lushtak and Jim David. In 2016 he performed live at the Library of Michigan alongside R.J. Spangler and jazz legend Larry Smith in support of the history of Jazz.

Litvin started working with well known YouTube personality TryHardNinja in 2012. Since then Litvin has produced well over 150 songs for TryHardNinja, which have amassed over 500 million hits on YouTube and include the song "It's Me". "It's Me" went on to be the #14 most downloaded dance song on iTunes for four weeks straight in 2015.

From 2009 to 2013, Litvin gave a series of live performances. These ranged from full band performances in support of his 2010 album Love Spectacle, and his 2012 album School, to experimental avant garde improvisational solo performances. Litvin also performed as a guitarist alongside New York City artists Aris Ziagos, Tyler Stone, Jeff Broadnax, and MenaceLiveNYC.

In 2015 Litvin began work on an elaborate music video with co-collaborator Bogdan Szabo for his 2016 single Zombie Movie. The video featured Kansas Bowling, Lloyd Kaufman, James Rolfe and Dylan Mars Greenberg.

In 2018, Litvin created musical score for the short film Operation Dolf, which was part of the horror anthology film Deathcember.

In October 2020, Litvin began writing songs for a new album called It's All Ending. Unlike Litvin's 2019 Instruments Of Pain, which is considered a break up album, It's All Ending largely focuses on themes of loneliness, isolation, and depression. The album was released in 2021 on double vinyl and digital. Litvin produced 3 music videos for the album, including "Come Over," "Long Long Way," and "Oh Sincerity."

In 2021 He started promoting his music in the town of Saint George UT Wearing a Red Teletubby Costume and dancing in public bars and at dancing events See Instagram

In 2023, after releasing It's All Ending, Litvin released an EP entitled Violence, and set off on a series of 4 tours to promote the material.

In early 2024, Litvin started working on a new album called Exit Reality, but the album got delayed because of personal issues as well as a relocation. After moving to Ray, Michigan in July 2024, he started working to complete the album again. Meanwhile, he formed a music group named UFO Religion with Chris Whiteside, and the duo have released 3 singles and 2 music videos.

In February 2025, Litvin opened a new music production studio called LITVIN STUDIO NYC, in the Chelsea neighborhood of Manhattan, New York City. He works both out of his home studio in Ray Michigan and LITVIN Studio NYC. Litvin has produced over 20 music albums as a solo artist.

== Film and Television Career ==
In 2010, while Canada's Best Kept Secret and Fake Henrik Zetterberg were in production, Litvin and DeLiso had begun working on the feature-length, horror-comedy Hectic Knife, which starred Litvin as a knife-wielding vigilante determined to rid his city of crime. DeLiso and Litvin finished Hectic Knife in 2015, and secured distribution via Troma Entertainment shortly after its completion. Hectic Knife premiered at the Druid Underground Film Festival in Brooklyn, New York at a screening hosted by Troma Entertainment co-founder Lloyd Kaufman.

In 2017, Litvin created his episodic web series called Blanket Folk, a comedy series starring blanket puppets, stuffed animals and children that do not speak but are incredibly expressive, the cast is joined with Peter Litvin and an assortment of his friends. One of the puppets, named Bok Bok, is incredibly chaotic. In the first episode, Bok Bok explodes a building. In the second, Bok Bok murders a man with a golf club. Each episode features and original song in it. With a total of 4 episodes (and a Christmas special) and an intro song.

In 2019, Litvin moved to Los Angeles where he began producing an absurdist comedy web series called Clown Sink TV, which is currently in its 5th episode. The show has featured talent such as Trent Haaga, and Whitney Wegman-Wood. The series is featured on Litvin's Peter Litvin Capers YouTube channel, alongside a variety of other content. Litvin wrote & directed a short film called The Creative Slump in late 2019, which was picked up for distribution by Troma Now and Night Flight. The film features Trent Haaga, Becca Lee Ward, and Sam Eidson. Shortly thereafter, Litvin began working on an official pilot for his former web series Blanket Folk. The pilot included such talent as Trent Haaga, Cheyanna Lavon Zubas, and James Brewer. Principal photography began in May, 2020. The remaining shoots were cancelled due to the COVID-19 Pandemic and the project remains on hold.

In 2020, Litvin formed a non-sports trading card imprint called Millenial Holocaust. In March 2021, he released a 90 card collectible set of Hectic Knife trading cards. April 2021, Millennial Holocaust entered into a licensing agreement with film distribution subsidiary Chip Thrills, LLC in order to begin work on a set of 68 Kill trading cards, based on the 2017 movie 68 Kill directed by Trent Haaga.

In May 2021, Litvin wrote, produced, and directed a short film entitled Part Of The Family, which features Trent Haaga, Becca Lee Ward, and Bogdan Szabo. The film is slated to be released in July 2021.

== Discography ==
=== With Inner Stellar ===
- Fish Hospital (1999)

=== With Space Cake ===
- Broken Abyss (2000)
- Beyond (2001)

=== With The Hourly Continuum ===
- The Hourly Continuum (2003)
- Meditation Medication (2004)
- Live 03’ (2019)
- Posthumous Ponderings (2020)

=== With Vitamin Troll ===
- Vitamin Troll (2006)
- Warehouse 1 (2006)
- Warehouse 2 (2006)
- Warehouse 3 (2006)
- Warehouse 4 (2006)
- Warehouse 5 (2006)
- Warehouse 6 (2006)

=== With UFO Religion ===
- They (2024)
- Casino (2025)
- $ Money (2025)

=== Released as Corpse Smoke ===
- Corpse Smoke EP
- Radical Return (2003)
- 4 Year Old In My Trunk (2004)
- Anti-Crotch Dream Sequence (2005)
- The Best of Corpse Smoke Vol 1 (2006)

=== Released as Peter Litvin ===
- Kick the clouds (2005)
- Gypsy Kiss self titled (2006)
- Melodies Fade (2009)
- Sing Along (2009)
- Gonna get you pregnant (Single 2010)
- Love Spectacle (2010)
- School (2012)
- Teleportation (2015)
- Dreamland Magic Spells (2015)
- Hectic Knife Official Soundtrack (2016)
- Instruments of Pain (2018)
- Asparagus Piss (2019)
- Buried Treasures (2021)
- Cutting Room Floor Vol. 1 (2021)
- Cutting Room Floor Vol. 2 (2022)
- Cutting Room Floor Vol. 3 (2022)
- It's All Ending (2022)
- Video Game Soundtrack (2022)
- Violence (2023)

=== Singles Released as Peter Litvin ===
- Gonna Get You Pregnant (2010)
- The Interview (2019)
- Pasadena (2019)
- Wishing Bad Things (2019)
- Still Here (2020)
- Funny Little Black Bat (2021)
- Now You've Got Me (2022)
- Can't Stop Movin (2022)
- Scary Monsters In America (2022)
- That Simple (2023)
- Smoked A Blunt (I'm Jewish) (2023)
- Robot Zones (2023)
- Goin' Blind (2024)
- For David (2024)
- Sin Armadura (2024)
- 27,000 Days (2024)
- Decaf Vertigo (2025)
