= Greg DeLiso =

American film director

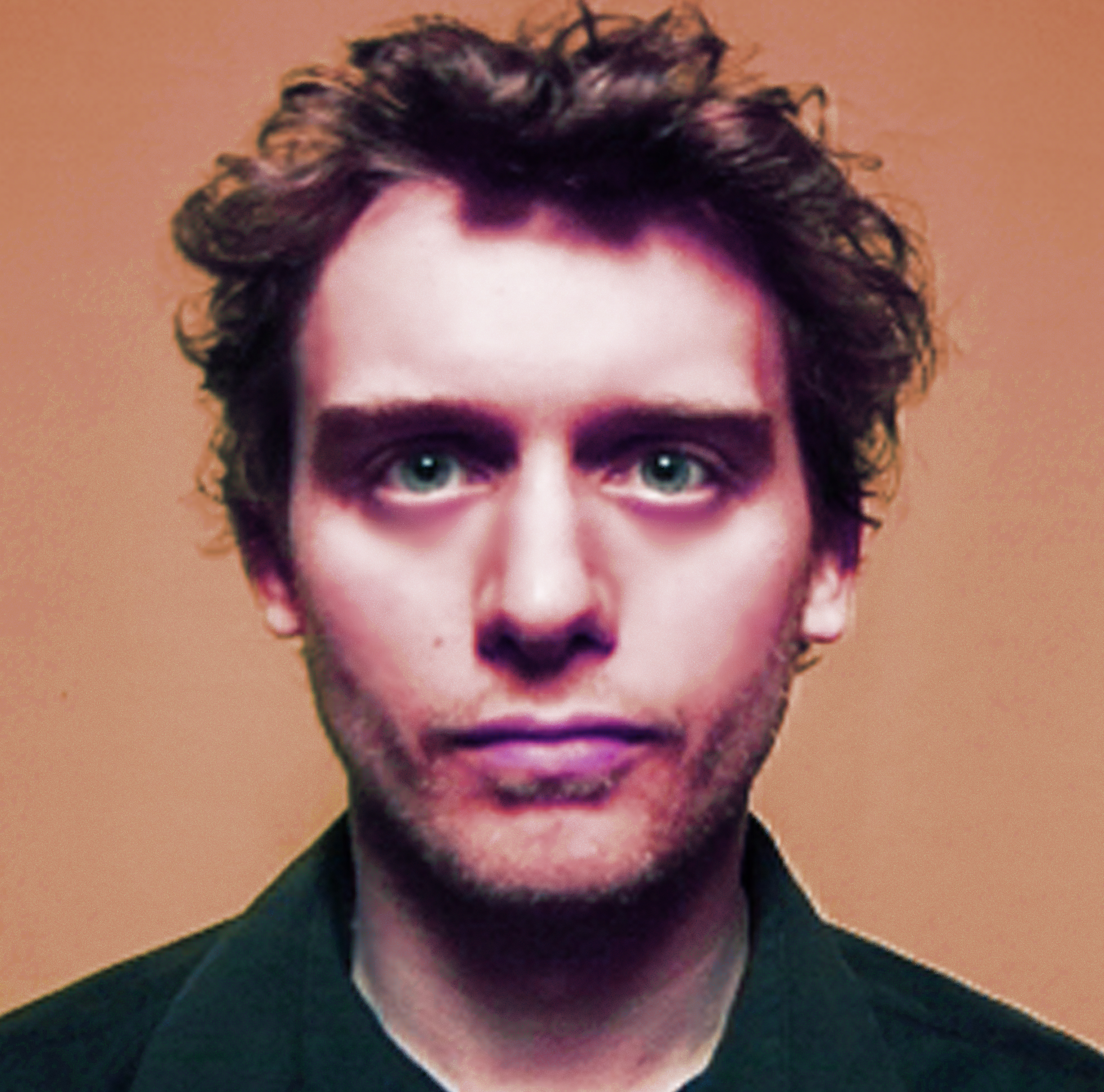
- Born: Greg DeLiso; October 25, 1986 (age 39); Shelby Township, Michigan, U.S.
- Education: New York Film Academy
- Occupations: Director, producer, editor, screenwriter, cinematographer
- Notable work: Heavy Metal Picnic, Canada's Best Kept Secret, Hectic Knife

Greg DeLiso (born October 25, 1986) is an American filmmaker, film editor, and director of photography. He was born in Detroit, Michigan.

== Early life ==
After graduating high school in 2004 at the age of 17, DeLiso relocated to New York City to attend the New York Film Academy’s one-year directing program, graduating in 2005.

== Film career ==
=== 2000s ===
In the Spring of 2008, DeLiso was tapped by legendary noise artist PBK to create a video for his song "Tout Va Bien". DeLiso enlisted the help of actor Jakob Hawkins (a consistent collaborator) and Sharon McPeek, and the three conceptualized and shot the video with DeLiso serving as editor and director.

Later in 2008, DeLiso began working with Nick Prueher and Joe Pickett of The Found Footage Festival, a touring comedy show featuring edited montages of unintentionally funny found VHS tapes. DeLiso joined the Found Footage Festival as a tape collector and editor. Through Prueher and Pickett, DeLiso was introduced to Jeff Krulik, and in 2010 served as editor and co-producer on Heavy Metal Picnic—Krulik's feature length follow up to Heavy Metal Parking Lot (1986), a legendary cult documentary about fans in the parking lot of a Judas Priest concert in Washington DC. Picnic was released on August 6, 2010, to rave reviews.

In 2009, DeLiso, again with Jakob Hawkins, released a video series called "Fun With Henrik Zetterberg." The videos center around a bumbling Henrik Zetterberg look-alike (played by Hawkins) and were positioned as spec commercial spots for the NHL and their affiliates. Although the spots were never picked up, the videos themselves went viral, garnering over 50,000 views in two days. The success of the videos spawned "Fake Henrik Zettererg," a twelve-episode web series authored by DeLiso and Hawkins. The series was launched on October 26, 2011, and has been featured on Yahoo Sports and The Huffington Post. The series featured Kevin Brown and Austin Pendleton.

Also in 2009, DeLiso shot, edited and directed the short documentary Store Front New York. The film is about photographers James and Karla Murray, and serves as a companion piece to their photo book, Store Front, which features shot of various neighborhood store fronts in New York City. A described in a review via The New Yorker, "These unfussy, elegant, and richly colored photographs of butcher shops, bakeries, fabric wholesalers, cuchifritos stands, stationery and sporting-goods stores, laundromats, groceries, and dive bars give connoisseurs of signage, folk typography, and ambient erosion much to pore over." The film screened at the Red Hook Film Festival in Brooklyn in October 2009.

=== 2010s ===
In 2011, DeLiso completed Canada’s Best Kept Secret, his first feature-length documentary as director, editor, cinematographer and producer. The film chronicles the life of RD Lawrence, a Canadian author/naturalist integral in the green movement of the 20th century. The original score was composed by actor and musician Peter Litvin, who DeLiso met in high school, and featured music by Ewan Dobson.

In January 2013, DeLiso co-founded the movie blog Smug Film with fellow filmmaker Cody Clarke, where DeLiso contributed movie reviews, essays, lists, and interviews, and appeared several times on its podcast.

DeLiso's first feature, Hectic Knife, was released on July 28, 2016. Hectic Knife is a super-hero comedy about a knife-wielding vigilante who fights against drug dealers, murderers and other "baddies," including Piggly Doctor, a villain bent on world domination. The idea for the film gestated as Litvin, who later co-wrote, starred in and produced the film, and DeLiso were working on a series titled "Short Films for Nobody". Filming began in 2010 and wrapped in 2015. Shortly after the film was finished, DeLiso and Litvin secured distribution via Troma Entertainment.
