= Lance Long =

American football player (born 1985)

No. 17, 19
- Position: Wide receiver

Personal information
- Born: May 4, 1985 (age 41); Detroit, Michigan, U.S.
- Listed height: 5 ft 11 in (1.80 m)
- Listed weight: 186 lb (84 kg)

Career information
- High school: Shelby Twp. (MI) Eisenhower
- College: Mississippi State
- NFL draft: 2008: undrafted

Career history
- Arizona Cardinals (2008–2009); Kansas City Chiefs (2009); Jacksonville Jaguars (2010)*; San Francisco 49ers (2010–2011)*; Detroit Lions (2012)
- * Offseason or practice squad member only

Career NFL statistics
- Receptions: 20
- Receiving yards: 178
- Receiving touchdowns: 0
- Stats at Pro Football Reference

Lance Christopher Long (born May 4, 1985) is an American former professional football player who was a wide receiver in the National Football League (NFL). He was signed by the Arizona Cardinals as an undrafted free agent in 2008. He played college football for the Mississippi State Bulldogs.

He was also a member of the Kansas City Chiefs and Jacksonville Jaguars.

== Professional career ==
=== Kansas City Chiefs ===
Long appeared in only one game for the Cardinals in 2009, and then was released. Long was signed by the Kansas City Chiefs and caught 20 passes for 178 yards during the 2009 season. He was released by the Chiefs prior to the 2010 season on August 31, 2010.

=== Jacksonville Jaguars ===
He was picked up by the Jacksonville Jaguars on September 22, 2010.

=== San Francisco 49ers ===
He was released by the San Francisco 49ers on September 3, 2011.

=== Detroit Lions ===
Long signed with Detroit on May 1, 2012. He was released on August 31 for final roster cuts before the start of the 2012 season. The Lions re-signed him on December 5, 2012. Long was waived again on December 14.

He signed a futures contract with the Detroit Lions on January 1, 2013.
