= The Palace of Auburn Hills =

Former multi-purpose arena in Auburn Hills, Michigan, US

- The Palace

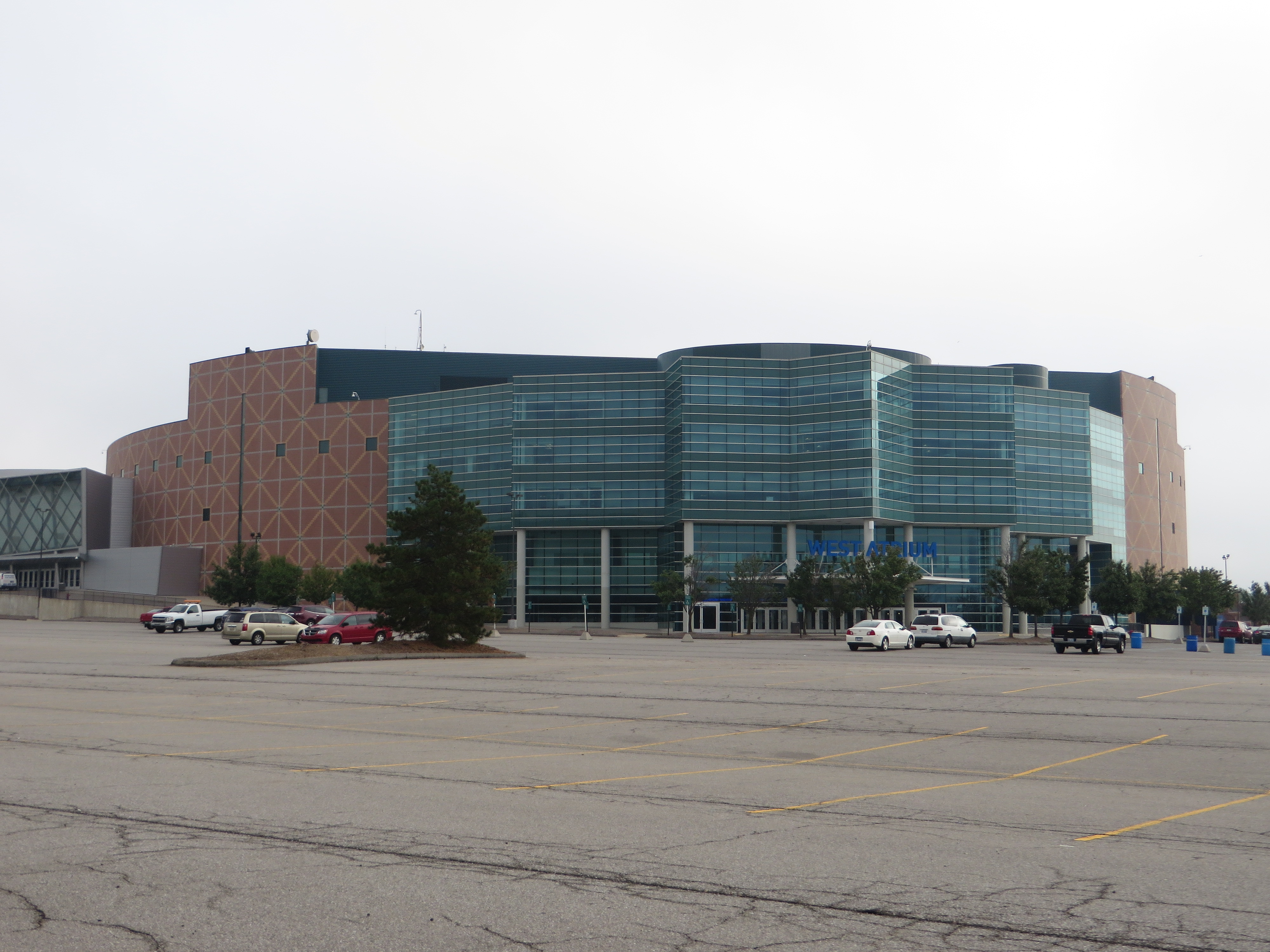
- The Palace in 2015
- Interactive map of The Palace of Auburn Hills
- Address: 6 Championship Drive
- Location: Auburn Hills, Michigan, U.S.
- Coordinates: 42°41′49″N 83°14′44″W
- Owner: Tom Gores
- Operator: Palace Sports & Entertainment
- Capacity: Basketball: 22,076; Ice hockey: 20,804; Concerts: 6,000 to 23,000

Construction
- Groundbreaking: June 7, 1986
- Opened: August 13, 1988
- Renovated: 2005, 2015
- Closed: October 12, 2017
- Demolished: July 11, 2020
- Cost: $90 million ($245 million in 2025 dollars)
- Architect: Rossetti Architects
- Project managers: Frank Rewold and Sons
- Structural engineers: McClerg & Associates Inc.
- General contractors: R.E. Dailey & Company

Tenants
- Detroit Pistons (NBA) (1988–2017); Detroit Vipers (IHL) (1994–2001); Detroit Safari (CISL) (1994–1997); Detroit Whalers (OHL) (1995–1996); Detroit Rockers (NPSL) (1997–2000); Detroit Shock (WNBA) (1998–2009); Detroit Fury (AFL) (2001–2004)

The Palace of Auburn Hills, commonly known as the Palace, was a multi-purpose arena located in Auburn Hills, Michigan. Opened in 1988, it was the home of the Detroit Pistons of the National Basketball Association (NBA), the Detroit Shock of the Women's National Basketball Association (WNBA), the Detroit Vipers of the International Hockey League, the Detroit Rockers of the National Professional Soccer League, the Detroit Neon/Detroit Safari of the Continental Indoor Soccer League, and the Detroit Fury of the Arena Football League.

The Palace was one of eight basketball arenas owned by their respective NBA franchises. The Pistons moved to Little Caesars Arena in Midtown Detroit in 2017 and the Palace was demolished in 2020.

== Naming ==
By the time it closed as an NBA venue, the Palace was one of only two arenas that had not sold its naming rights to a corporate sponsor. The other was Madison Square Garden.

The court was previously named the "William Davidson Court", in honor of late owner Bill Davidson, prior to the Pistons' home opener on October 30, 2009. His signature was removed from the hardwood when Tom Gores bought the Palace and was re-retired in its rafters alongside the other banners.

== History ==
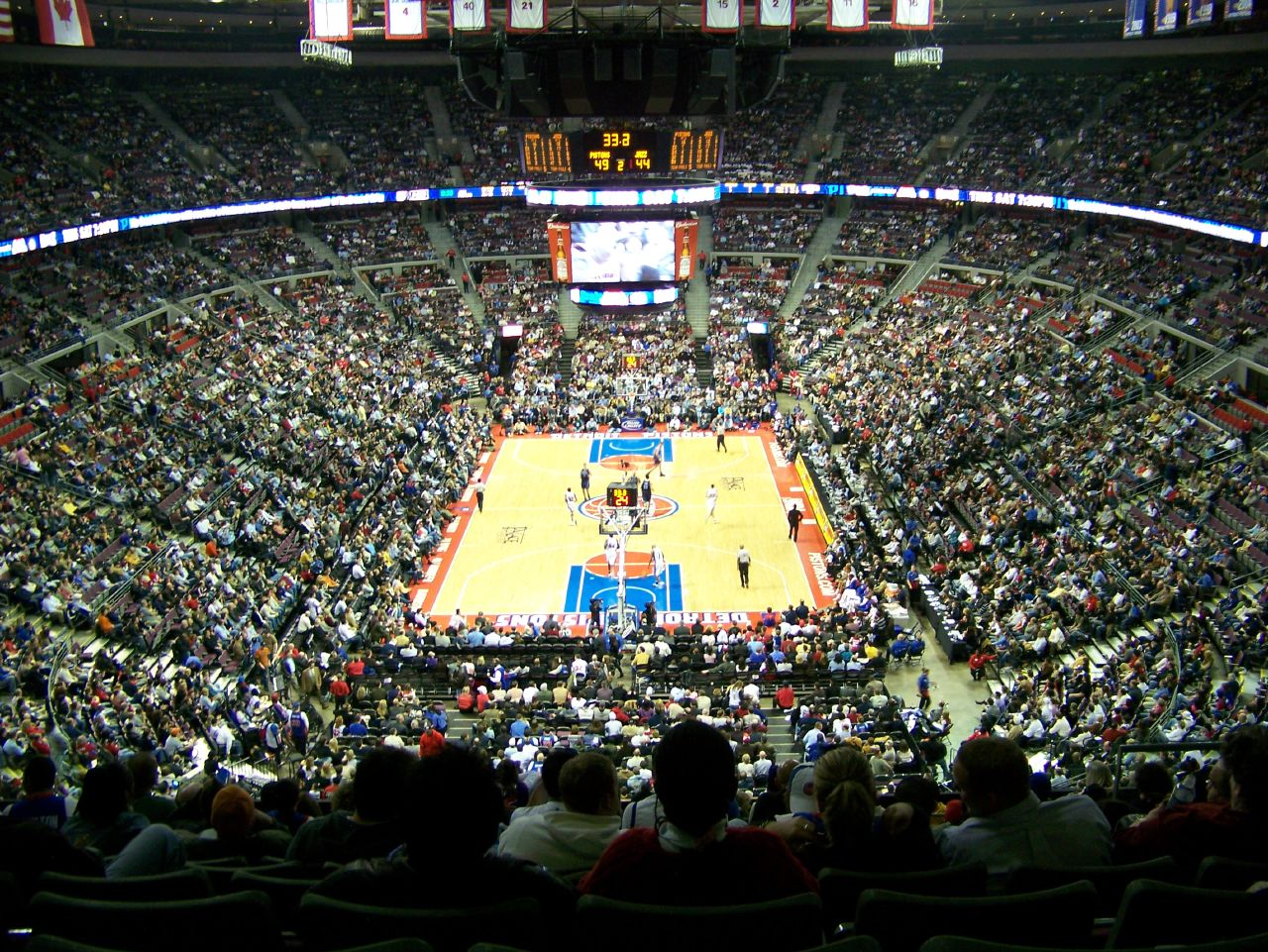
The interior of the Palace of Auburn Hills during a Detroit Pistons basketball game in January 2006.

=== Background ===
From 1957 to 1978, the Pistons competed in Detroit's Olympia Stadium, Memorial Building, and Cobo Arena. In 1978, owner Bill Davidson elected not to share the new Joe Louis Arena with the National Hockey League's Detroit Red Wings, instead opting to relocate the team to the Pontiac Silverdome in suburban Pontiac, a venue constructed for football, where it remained for the next decade. While the Silverdome could accommodate massive crowds, it offered substandard sight lines for basketball games. In late 1985, a group led by Davidson decided to build a new arena in Auburn Hills. Groundbreaking for the arena took place in June 1986. Using entirely private funding, the Palace cost a relatively low price of $90 million. The Davidson family held a controlling interest in the arena until Tom Gores bought it as part of his purchase of the Pistons in 2011.

=== Construction ===
Then-Pistons owner Bill Davidson and two developers privately financed the $90 million construction of the Palace, and did not require public funds.

The Palace was built with 180 luxury suites, considered an exorbitant number when it opened, virtually all later consistently leased. In December 2005, the Palace added five underground luxury suites, each containing 450 square feet (42 m^{2}) of space and renting for $450,000 per year. Eight more luxury suites, also located below arena level, were opened in February 2006. They range in size from 800 to 1,200 square feet (74 to 111 m^{2}) and were rented for $350,000 annually. The architectural design of the Palace, including its multiple tiers of luxury suites, has been used as the basis for many other arenas in North America since its construction.

=== Basketball ===
The Palace opened in 1988. When one of its basketball occupants won a championship, the number on its address changed. Its address was 6 Championship Drive, reflecting the Pistons' three NBA titles and the Shock's three WNBA titles. (Note: The Vipers' 1997 Turner Cup championship was not officially recognized in the arena's address; the address also remained unchanged despite the Shock's move to Tulsa, Oklahoma, in 2010; that team is now known as the Dallas Wings.)

The Palace was widely considered to be the first of the modern-style NBA arenas, and its large number of luxury suites was a major reason for the building boom of new NBA arenas in the 1990s. Although the Palace became one of the oldest arenas in the NBA, its foresighted design contained the amenities that most NBA teams have sought in new arenas built since that time. By contrast, the other NBA venues that opened in late 1988/early 1989, Charlotte Coliseum, Miami Arena, Bradley Center, ARCO Arena and Amway Arena, were all considered obsolete relatively quickly, due to a lack of luxury suites and club seating, lucrative revenue-generating features that made pro sports teams financially successful in order to remain competitive long-term.

Nonetheless, Palace Sports & Entertainment (PS&E) had spent $117.5 million in upgrades and renovations to keep the arena updated. A new high definition JumboTron monitor, new LED video monitors, and more than 950 feet (290 m) of ribbon display technology from Daktronics was installed in the mid-2000s.

==== The Malice at the Palace ====
On November 19, 2004, a fight broke out between members of the Pistons and Indiana Pacers after Pacers forward Ron Artest committed a hard foul on Pistons center Ben Wallace. As the on-court fight died down, a fan, John Green, threw a cup of Diet Coke at Artest, who then ran into the stands to fight another fan, Michael Ryan, whom he mistakenly believed to be responsible, and this immediately escalated into a full-scale brawl between other fans and players. The fight lasted for several minutes and resulted in the suspension of nine players (including Artest, who was suspended for the remainder of the 2004–05 NBA season and also the playoffs), criminal charges against five players, and criminal charges against five spectators. The offending fans, including Green, Charlie Haddad and A.J. Shackleford, were banned for life from attending games at the Palace. In the aftermath of the fight, the NBA decided to increase the security presence between players and spectators. The fact that the fight took place at the Palace led to it becoming colloquially referred to as the "Malice at the Palace" and the "Basketbrawl".

On July 22, 2008, nearly four years after this incident, another fight took place at the Palace, this time between the Detroit Shock and Los Angeles Sparks of the WNBA. This fight was dubbed "The Malice at the Palace II".

=== Select concerts ===
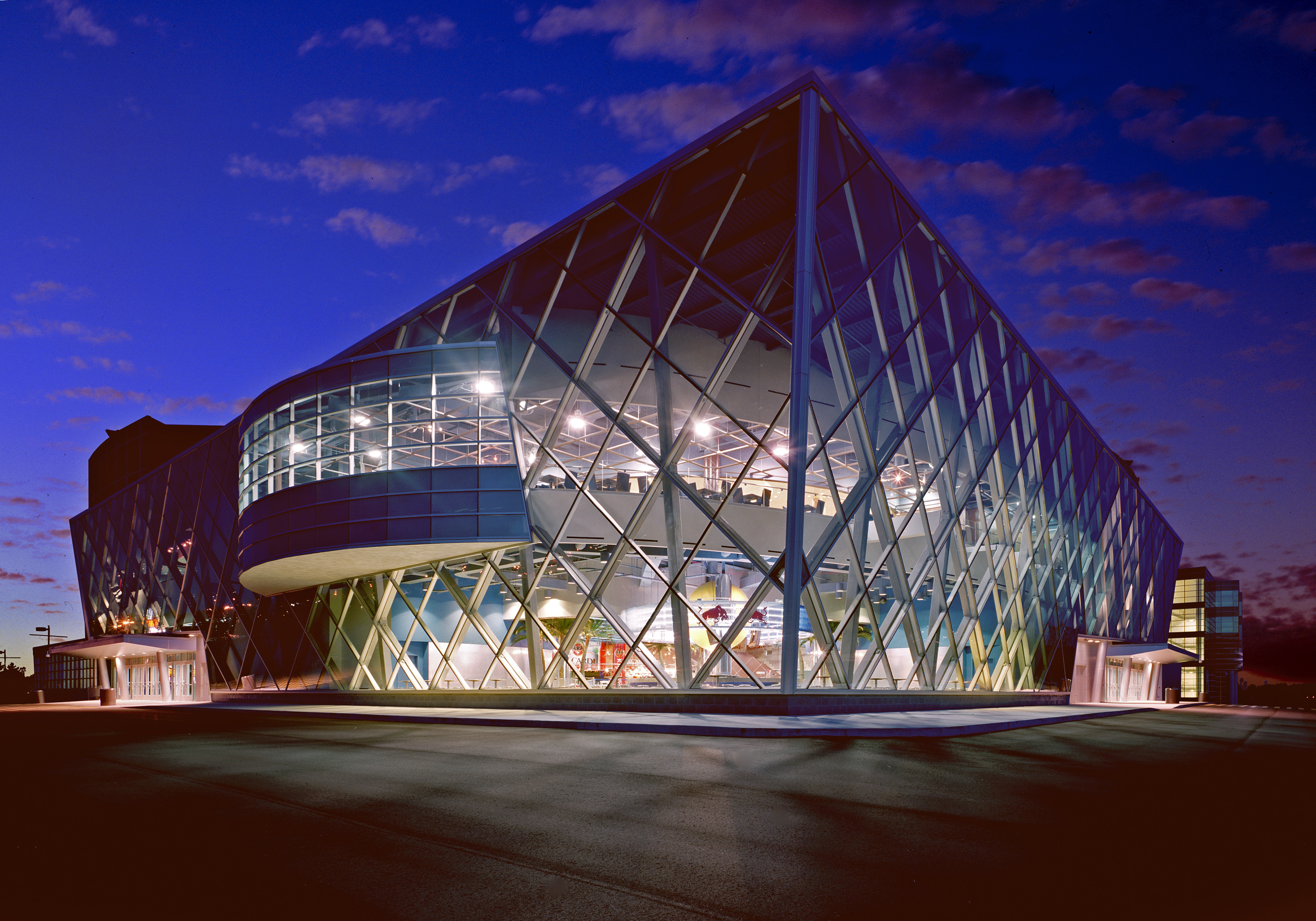
The Palace at night

During his ...Nothing Like the Sun Tour on August 13, 1988, Sting became the first musician to perform at the Palace.

Pink Floyd performed here from August 16–17, 1988, as part of their A Momentary Lapse of Reason Tour.

Rush performed on March 8th and 9th, 1990 during their Presto Tour. They also returned on March 22nd 1994 on their Counterparts Tour

Michael Jackson performed three sold-out shows during his Bad World Tour from October 24–26, 1988.

Janet Jackson performed two shows here from August 22–23, 1990, as part of her Rhythm Nation World Tour. She returned from July 30–31, 2001, on her All for You Tour.

On October 21, 1990 MC Hammer made a stop at the Palace as part of his Please Hammer Don't Hurt 'Em World Tour.

Aerosmith played the venue 14 times from 1990 to 2012.

Grateful Dead performed at the Palace eight times from 1992 to 1995.

Van Halen performed four shows on their For Unlawful Carnal Knowledge Tour from February 21–22, 1992, and from April 3–4, 1992. They also performed consecutive shows during their The Balance "Ambulance" Tour from April 15–16, 1995.

U2 performed at the Palace on March 27, 1992, on the first leg of their Zoo TV Tour. During the performance, Bono called a local pizza bar from the stage and ordered 10,000 pizzas for the crowd in attendance. Approximately 100 pizzas were delivered. They returned on May 30, 2001, for their Elevation Tour, and on October 24 and 25, 2005 for their Vertigo Tour.

The Cure performed two consecutive shows, during their Wish Tour from July 18–19, 1992, with The Cranes as their opening act. The shows were recorded and released as a live album, entitled Show.

Bon Jovi performed during their Keep the Faith world tour on March 2, 1993, their Crush Tour on November 18, 2000, their Lost Highway Tour on February 20 and July 7, 2008, and their Circle Tour in 2010.

On August 13, 1993, Steely Dan performed at the Palace as part of their tour in support of Donald Fagen’s album Kamakiriad. This was Steely Dan’s first ever live performance since 1974.

The Palace was the site of an attempt on the life of Led Zeppelin guitarist Jimmy Page, while he was on tour, with former bandmate Robert Plant, during their No Quarter Tour. On March 31, 1995, Lance Alworth Cunningham, a 23-year-old who thought Led Zeppelin's music contained Satanic messages, tried to rush the stage with a knife. He was subdued about 50 feet from the stage.

Grand Funk Railroad performed a benefit show for Bosnia and Herzegovina in March 1997 on their Reunion Tour. The show also featured Peter Frampton, Alto Reed, Paul Shaffer, and the Detroit Symphony Orchestra. The performance was recorded, and released as the double-live Bosnia album in October of that year.

Phish played at the Palace during their fall 1997 tour on December 6, 1997. They also played three other Palace shows in 1995, 1996, and 1999.

The British group the Spice Girls performed at the Palace during their Spiceworld Tour on July 26, 1998.

Madonna performed two sold-out shows during her Drowned World Tour from August 25–26, 2001. The shows were recorded and broadcast live on HBO and were later released as a DVD, entitled Drowned World Tour 2001.

Beyoncé performed at the venue numerous times, notably alongside Alicia Keys and Missy Elliott in 2004 during their Verizon Ladies First Tour, as a member of Destiny's Child in 2005 for their final tour Destiny Fulfilled... and Lovin' It, and later as a solo artist in 2007, 2009, and 2013 for her respective world tours The Beyoncé Experience, I Am... Tour and The Mrs Carter Show World Tour. Throughout her career, she is estimated to have sold over 60,000 tickets at this arena.

Prince brought his Musicology Live 2004ever tour to the Palace from June 2–21, 2004. He returned to the venue on July 31.

The Australian children's music group The Wiggles performed at the Palace on August 15, 2005, with their "Sailing Around the World Live!" tour. On August 11, 2006, they performed there with their "Wiggledancing! Live On Stage" tour. On August 15, 2007, they performed there with their "Racing to The Rainbow Live!" tour. On August 12, 2008, they performed there with their "Pop Go The Wiggles Live!" tour. On August 14, 2009, they performed there with their "The Wiggles Go Bananas! Live in Concert" tour. On August 27, 2010, they performed at the Palace with their "Wiggly Circus" tour. On July 29, 2011, they performed at the Palace with their "Ukulele Baby! Live In Concert" tour, and on August 10, 2012, with "The Celebration Tour!".

Three Days Grace held a concert at the Palace on March 21, 2008, which was recorded and released on DVD. Live at the Palace 2008 is their only full concert video to date.

Taylor Swift, who opened for Brad Paisley at the Palace on October 4, 2007, returned from March 26–27, 2010, playing back-to-back sold-out shows during her Fearless Tour.

Coldplay performed a sold-out show at the arena on August 1, 2012, as part of their Mylo Xyloto Tour. The band came back to the arena on August 3, 2016, to perform for a sold-out crowd of 15,436 as part of their A Head Full of Dreams Tour.

=== Replacement and demolition ===
In October 2016, it was reported that the Pistons' ownership were negotiating a possible relocation to Little Caesars Arena, a new multi-purpose venue then under construction in Downtown Detroit, for the 2017–18 season. Little Caesars Arena was initially designed for ice hockey to replace Joe Louis Arena as home of the National Hockey League's Detroit Red Wings, so some design modifications were needed to accommodate the Pistons. On November 22, 2016, the team officially announced that they would play at Little Caesars Arena in 2017. The final NBA game at the Palace was played on April 10, 2017, with the Pistons losing to the Washington Wizards, 105–101. This game ended a 42-year history of professional sports in Oakland County.

Local school district Utica Community Schools held commencement for all four of its high schools—Utica, Eisenhower, Stevenson, and Ford II—at the Palace for decades. The class of 2017 was the final class to walk the stage at the Palace in June 2017.

Bob Seger held the final concert at the venue on September 23, 2017. The last scheduled event at the venue was the Taste of Auburn Hills on October 12, 2017. Palace Sports & Entertainment entered into a joint venture with Olympia Entertainment known as 313 Presents to jointly manage entertainment bookings and promotions for Little Caesars Arena and other venues owned by the firms.

At its closure, the Palace was still in top condition as a sporting and concert venue, but its location in a northern suburb, far from the city center, conflicted with a trend of "walkable urbanism" that the Pistons thought would grow their fanbase. It was speculated that the Palace would likely end up being demolished, and the site would be redeveloped to accommodate a possible new auto supplier headquarters and research and development parks.

In August 2018, the arena's Palace360 scoreboard, installed in 2014, was sold to the Arizona Coyotes to replace the old one at Desert Diamond Arena in time for the 2018–19 season. They were not allowed to take the scoreboard with them when they were evicted from Desert Diamond Arena in 2022.

In October 2018, it was reported Oakland University considered purchasing the arena. Ultimately, a deal never went through.

On June 24, 2019, the arena was sold to a joint venture, which planned to redevelop the property into a mixed-use office park. Demolition of the arena began in February 2020. Demolition was completed on July 11, 2020, when the roof was demolished using explosives by Controlled Demolition, Inc. General Motors purchased the site in 2023, to build a parts plant in support of its electric cars.

== See also ==
- Pine Knob Music Theatre
- List of indoor arenas in the United States
- Sports in Detroit
- Tourism in metropolitan Detroit

== Notes ==
Events and tenants
| Preceded by Pontiac Silverdome | Home of the Detroit Pistons; 1988–2017 | Succeeded by Little Caesars Arena |
| Preceded by none | Home of the Detroit Shock; 1998–2009 | Succeeded by BOK Center |
| Preceded by DeSoto Civic Center | Host of Slammiversary; 2009 | Succeeded by TNA Impact! Zone |
