= Utica High School (Michigan) =

Location
- 47255 Shelby Road; Shelby Township, Michigan 48317; United States; 42°38′29″N 83°2′23″W

Information
- Established: 1860
- School district: Utica Community Schools
- Superintendent: Robert S. Monroe
- Principal: Timothy Youngblood
- Teaching staff: 70.20 (on an FTE basis)
- Key people: Troy Hayes - Athletics Director
- Grades: 10th through 12th
- Enrollment: 1,372 (2023-2024)
- Student to teacher ratio: 19.54
- Colors: Orange and Black
- Athletics conference: Macomb Area Conference
- Nickname: Chieftains
- Rivals: Eisenhower Henry Ford II High School; Stevenson Romeo High School
- Newspaper: The Arrow
- Yearbook: The Warrior
- Information: 586-797-2200
- Website: https://uticahigh.uticak12.org/

Utica High School, known locally as UHS, is one of four public high schools in the Utica Community School District, located in the metro Detroit region.

== History ==
The forerunner of Utica High School, the Utica Union School, opened in 1860. It was renamed Utica High School in 1900. The school was originally located within its namesake city of Utica, Michigan until 1955, when the construction of the current building was completed in Shelby Township. The former location is now home to Eppler Jr. High School.

Utica High School was the district's original high school. It served as the sole high school until Henry Ford II, Stevenson, and Eisenhower High Schools opened in the late '60s and '70s.

== Demographics ==
As of the 2020–2021 school year, the school had a total enrollment of 1,404. Of that, 84.3% were white, 4.7% were African American, 4.1% were Asian, 4.3% were Hispanic, 2.3% were multi-racial, 0.2% were native Hawaiian/Pacific Islander, and 0.1% were Native American.

The gender distribution was evenly distributed between those male and female.

Approximately 36% of the student body was considered economically disadvantaged, with 31% eligible to participate in the Free Lunch Program under the National School Lunch Act.

== Athletics ==
Utica competes in the Macomb Area Conference. The football team plays their home games at Swinehart Field, which they share with crosstown rival Eisenhower High School.

The school participates in a number of sports:

Sport	Boys	Girls	Season
Cross country	X	X	Fall
Football	X		Fall
Golf	X	X	Fall - girls; Spring - boys
Soccer	X	X	Fall - boys; Spring - girls
Swimming / Diving	X	X	Fall - girls; Winter - boys
Tennis	X	X	Fall - boys; Spring - girls
Volleyball		X	Fall
Baseball / Softball	X	X	Spring
Lacrosse	X		Spring
Track and field	X	X	Spring
Basketball	X	X	Winter
Bowling	X	X	Winter
Competitive cheer		X	Winter
Ice hockey*	X		Winter
Wrestling	X	X	Winter

*unified team of players from Utica and Ford II

In the 2019–2020 school year, All-Academic Athletes made up over 80% of all athletes.

== Notable alumni ==
- Norm Augustinus - Writer, comedian, actor
- Joe Cada - Winner of the 2009 World Series of Poker Main Event
- Freddie Crittenden - Professional hurdler
- Duke Maas - former Major League Baseball player for the Detroit Tigers, Kansas City Athletics, and New York Yankees
- Steve Stonebreaker - Former National Football League linebacker
