= Stewart M-2 =

M-2

General information
- Type: Light Twin
- National origin: United States
- Manufacturer: W.F. Stewart Company
- Designer: Jack Hunt, Lionel Kitchen
- Number built: 1

History
- Introduction date: 1930

The Stewart M-2 was an American all-metal, twin-engined, aerial survey aircraft.

== Design and development ==
The W.F. Stewart Company was a custom builder of wooden auto bodies. When factory-built steel bodies overtook wood construction, the company broke into the aviation market with the Stewart M-1, an all-wood monoplane. Sensing wood construction was about to be overtaken by all-metal aircraft, the Stewart M-2 was developed.

The M-2 was an all-metal, twin-engined aircraft with conventional landing gear, powered with Wright J-6 engines. 225 hp Packard DR-980 engines were later installed and tested. Townend rings were used on the re-installed Wright J-6 engines.

== Operational history ==
Designer Jack Hunt test flew the prototype on 22 May 1931. No orders for new aircraft were received. The aircraft was used by Abrams Aerial Survey Corporation for aerial surveys. The airframe was scrapped in 1941.

== Specifications (M-2) ==
Data from Skyways

General characteristics

- Crew: 1
- Capacity: 4
- Length: 37 ft (11 m)
- Wingspan: 52 ft 10 in (16.10 m)
- Powerplant: 2 × Packard DR-980 Radial, 225 hp (168 kW) each

Performance

- Maximum speed: 135 kn (155 mph, 249 km/h)
- Cruise speed: 110 kn (130 mph, 210 km/h)
- Stall speed: 52 kn (60 mph, 97 km/h)
