= Packard DR-980 =

American Diesel engine

DR-980
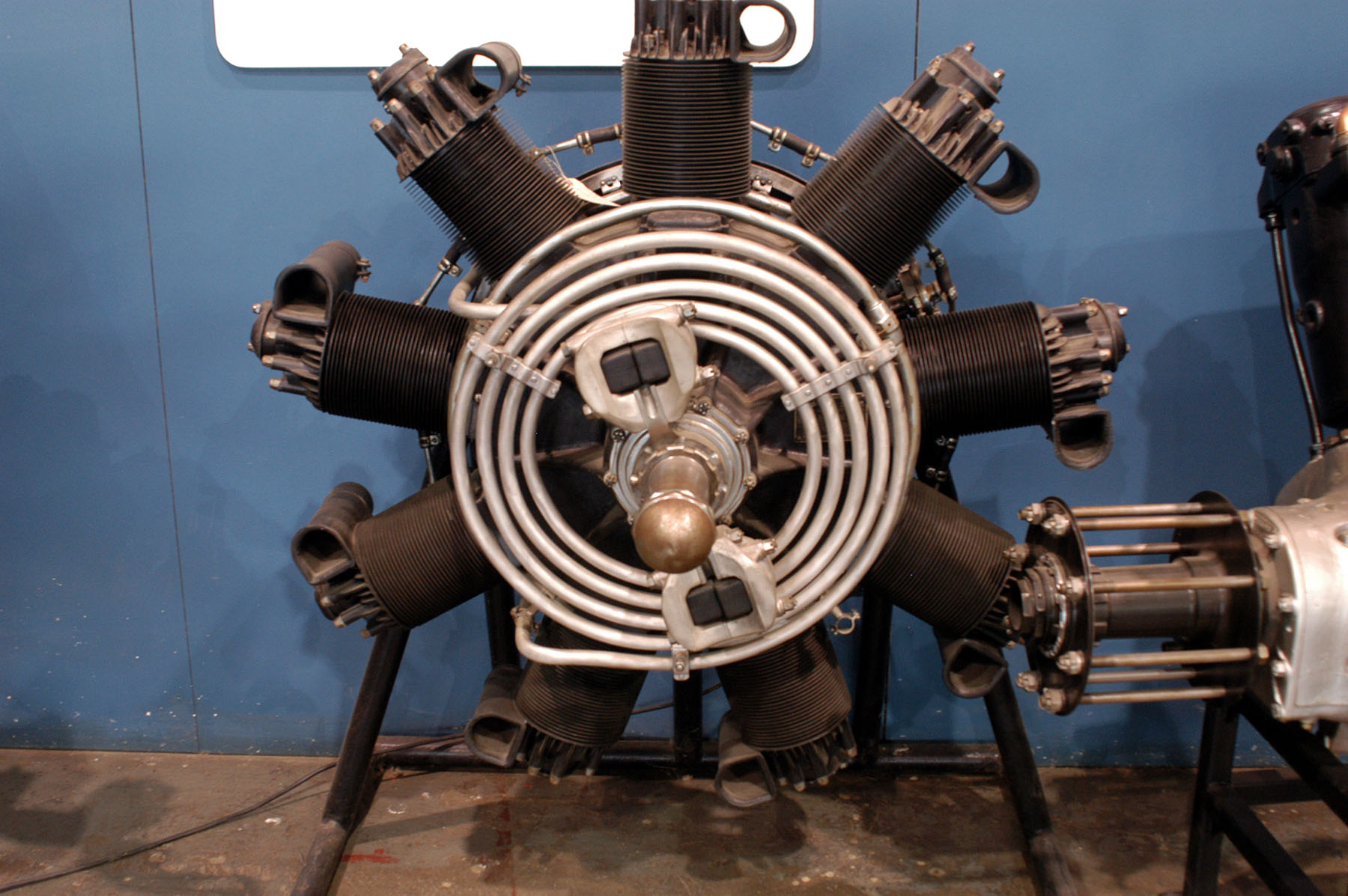
- A preserved Packard DR-980 on display at the National Museum of the United States Air Force
- Type: Air-cooled Diesel radial engine
- National origin: United States of America
- Manufacturer: Packard
- First run: 1928
- Number built: c. 100

The Packard DR-980 was an American air-cooled nine-cylinder four-stroke diesel radial aircraft engine displacing 982 cu in (16.09 L). It was the first aircraft diesel engine to power an airplane. First flown privately in 1928, a slightly refined version of the engine was later certificated for sale 1930. The DR-980 was unpopular despite its economy and reliability due to the unpleasant nature of its diesel exhaust fumes and considerable vibration when running; approximately 100 were built.

== Design and development ==
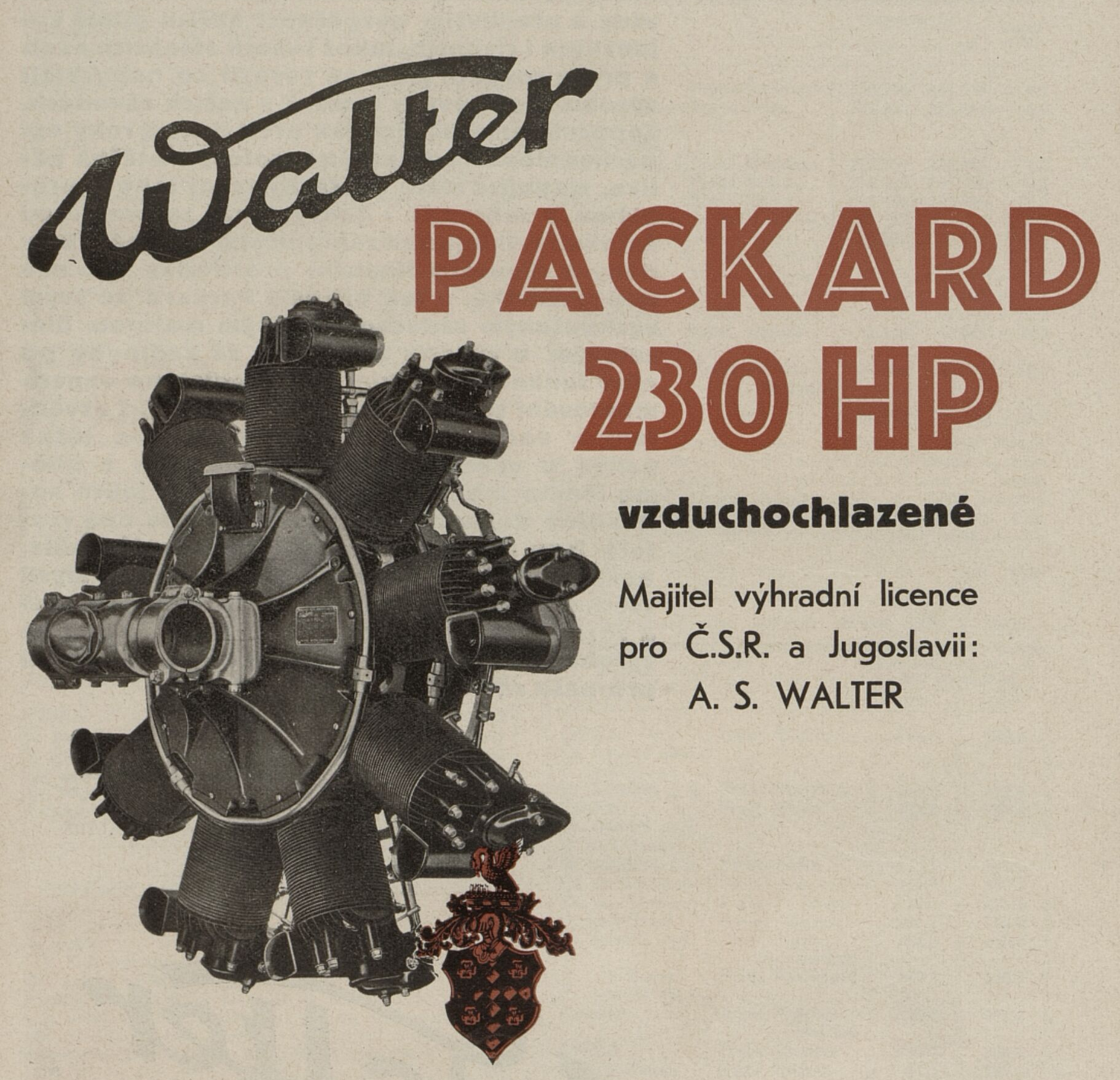
Advertisement of license version of Packard from the company Walter

The engine was conceived as a joint project between Professor Hermann Dorner and the Packard Motor Car Company. Dorner approached Packard during his time in America, and they formed a license agreement in August 18, 1927 to develop diesel engines based on Dorner's patents. Captain Lionel Woolson, chief aeronautical engineer for Packard, tested Dorner's experimental engines prior to the agreement being drafted. Once the license agreement was in place, Dorner and Woolson worked together to design the DR-980, with help from Packard engineers and Dorner’s assistant Adolph Widmann. During development, Dorner was responsible for designing the combustion system and Woolson was responsible for designing the weight-saving features.

Weight-savings was a critical design element of the DR-980, as contemporary diesel engines (even those considered "lightweight") lacked the power-to-weight ratio to achieve powered flight. Dorner's diesel engine patents massively reduced weight of a diesel engine, by comparison to Rudolf Diesel's original design. Diesel's original system involved an "air blast" fuel injection system, which provided a desirable turbulence for mixing fuel and air, but required a high-pressure air reservoir and compressor to be fitted to the engine. Instead, Dorner's injection system (so-called "solid" injection) eliminated the reservoir and compressor entirely, injecting only fuel and relying upon novel geometries of the combustion chamber and piston to spin the air for turbulence: "By means of rotating the air column around the cylinder axis, fresh air was constantly led along the fuel spray to achieve completely sootless burning-up". Dorner also mounted individual fuel pumps to each fuel injector, eliminating high-pressure fuel lines which were problematic in other contemporary fuel injection schemes.

Many weight-saving design features were introduced in addition to Dorner's patents. The engine made extensive use of magnesium alloy castings (instead of the conventional aluminum alloy), especially the crankcase. Piston cylinders were secured to the crankcase via two steel alloy hoops, which maintained constant tension at all times. Crankshaft size and weight were reduced by using flexibly-mounted counterweights, to absorb the high maximum impulse from the originally-intended compression ratio of 16:1. To reduce the number of parts in the valvetrain and the weight of the cylinder head, a single overhead valve was used per cylinder, for both air intake and exhaust.

One recognizable feature of later DR-980 models was the oil cooler, a spiral of metal tubing placed around the propeller shaft.

== Testing and accolades ==
The first flight of the DR-980 was on 19 September 1928 in Utica, Michigan at the Packard Proving Grounds. The engine propelled a Stinson Detroiter SM-1DX aircraft. The Crown Prince of Spain took a flight on this Detroiter later that autumn.

The first cross-country flight with a diesel-powered aircraft in the United States was made with the DR-980, when Woolson flew from Detroit to Langley Field in 1929, a distance of 700 miles (1,126 km) with a flight time of 6 hours and 40 minutes. On a later flight in a Stinson Detroiter from Detroit to Miami, the new engine showed its economy, the cost for fuel consumption being less than one cent a mile. This aircraft (complete with its engine) is preserved at the Golden Wings Flying Museum.

In 1930, the DR-980 passed its 50-hour certification test with a continuous rating of 225 hp (168 kW) at 1,950 rpm. It was certified by the US Department of Commerce on March 6, 1930 after roughly 1500 hours of testing. The DR-980 was the first diesel aircraft engine to be issued an approved type certificate.

=== Radiophone Communications Record ===
On 3 June 1929 the first two-way, radiophone communication took place over the skies of the Packard Proving Grounds in Utica, (now Shelby Township, Michigan). Heretofore, gasoline powered aircraft caused too much electromagnetic interference for the weak voice signal to be heard over the static. Only a strong Morse code signal could be heard. As diesel engines neither have spark plugs, nor spark plug wiring the EM static was greatly reduced and allowed voice communication to be used. The two-way ground to plane voice communication was witnessed by the U.S. Department of Commerce.

=== Endurance record ===
On 28 May 1931, a Bellanca CH-300 fitted with a DR-980, piloted by Walter Edwin Lees and Frederic Brossy, set a record for staying aloft for 84 hours and 32 minutes without being refueled. This record was not broken until 55 years later by the Rutan Voyager.

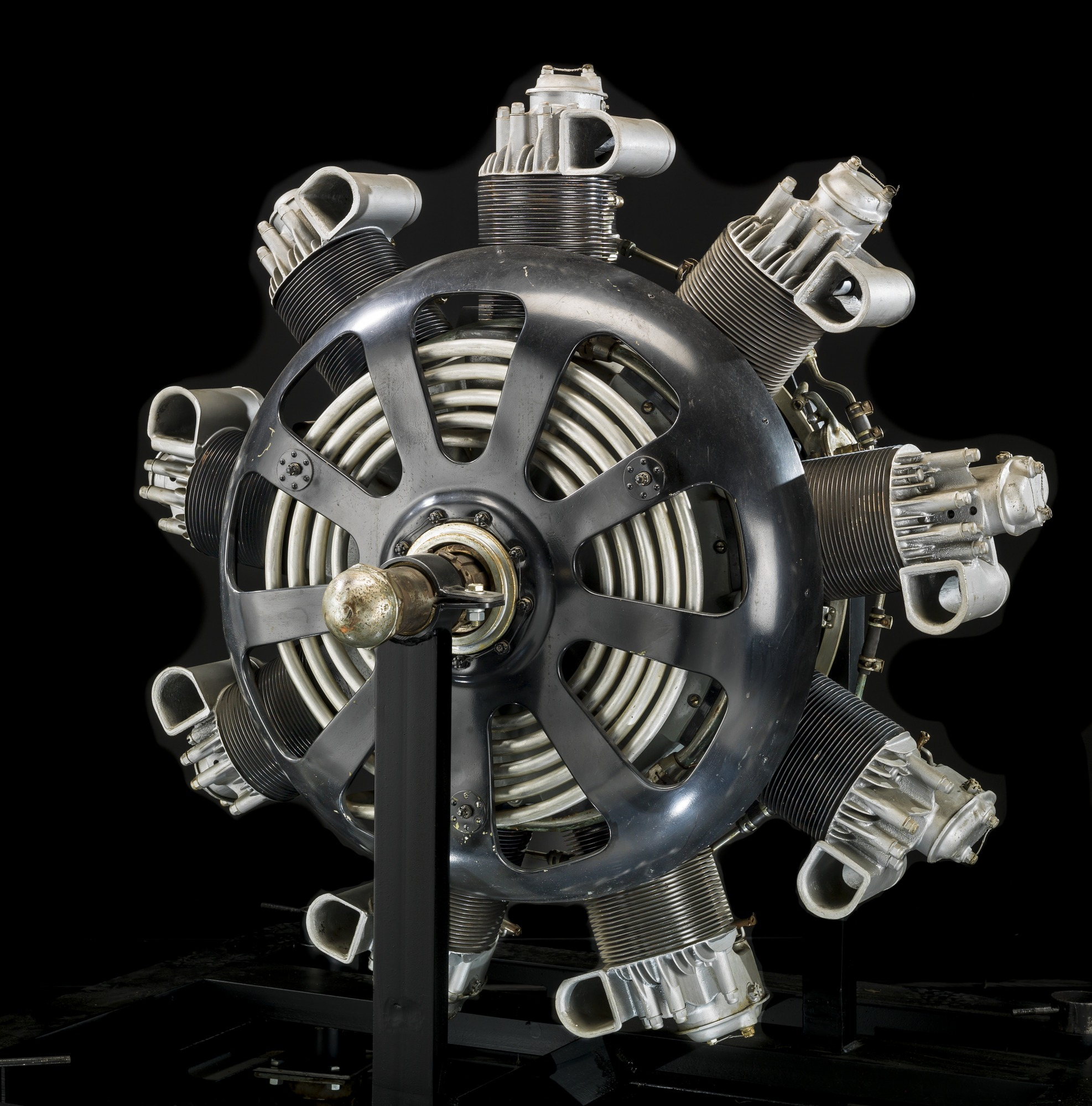

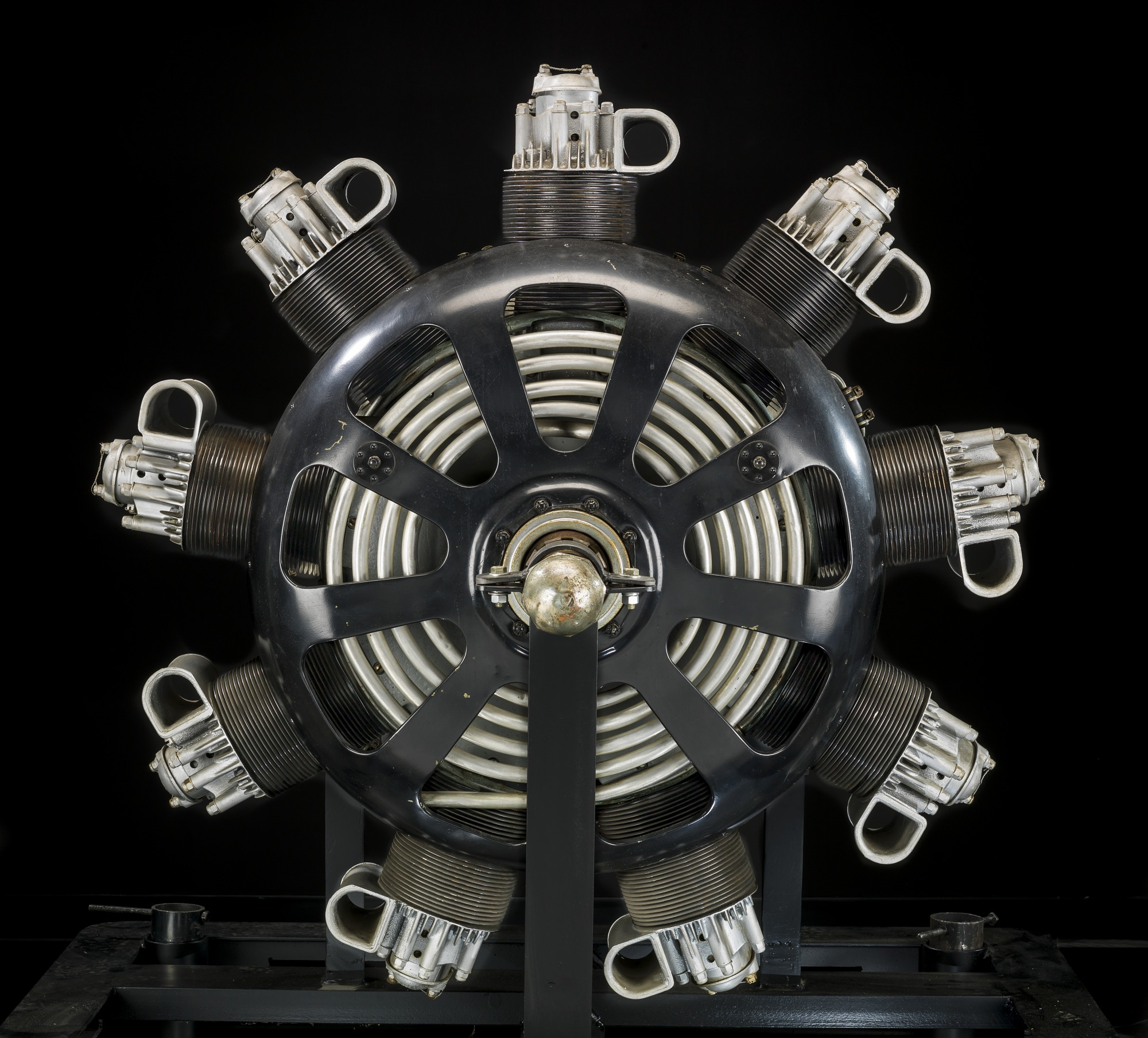

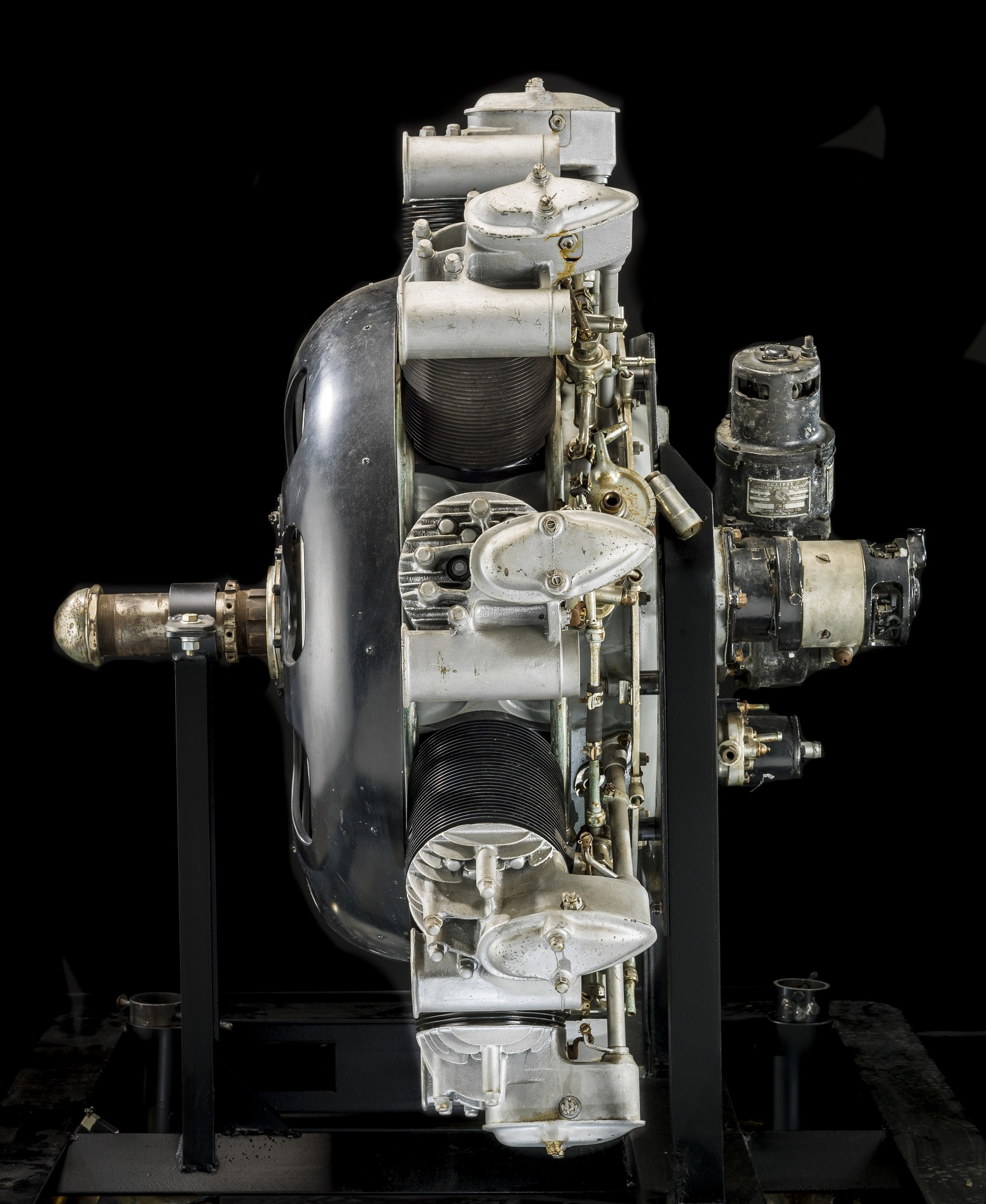

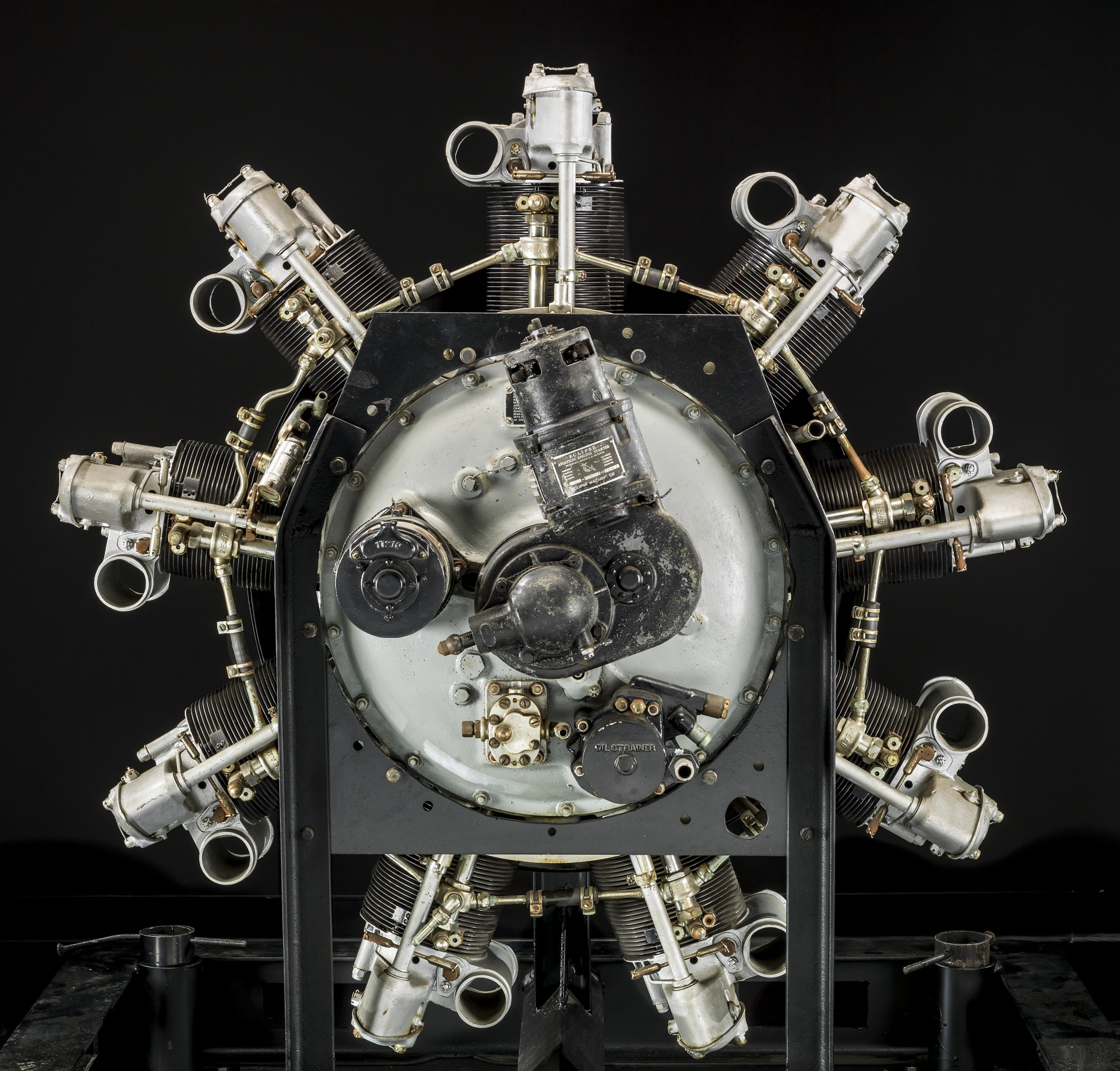

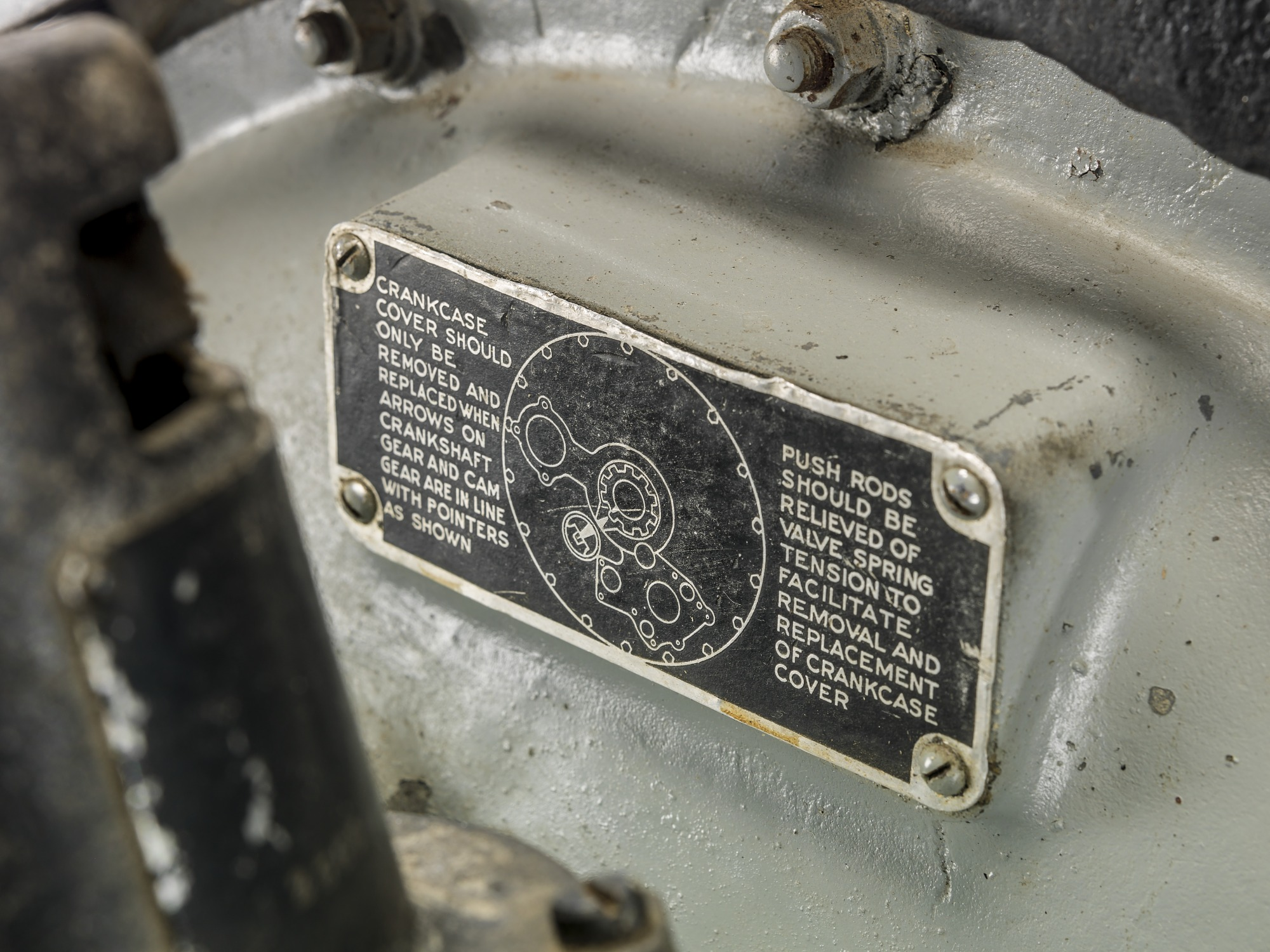

== Applications ==
- Aero A.35 – prototype OK-AUA
- Bellanca CH-200
- Bellanca CH-300
- Brunner-Winkle Bird
- Buhl Airsedan
- Ford Model 11
- Mooney A-1
- O-17 Courier
- Stewart M-2
- Stinson Detroiter
- Verville Sport Trainer
- Waco HSO and HTO

== Production and legacy ==
Based on successful early testing of the engine, Packard built a factory during the first half of 1929. It was intended to produce 500 DR-980 engines per month, for the commercial market. The factory cost approximately 650,000 (1929) (equivalent to 12.19 million in 2025).

Production of the DR-980 ceased following the death of Captain Woolson in an aviation accident in April 1930; his legacy was the award of the Collier Trophy in 1931 to the Packard Motor Car Company for its work with this type of engine. Dorner returned to Germany in 1931.

== Engines on display ==
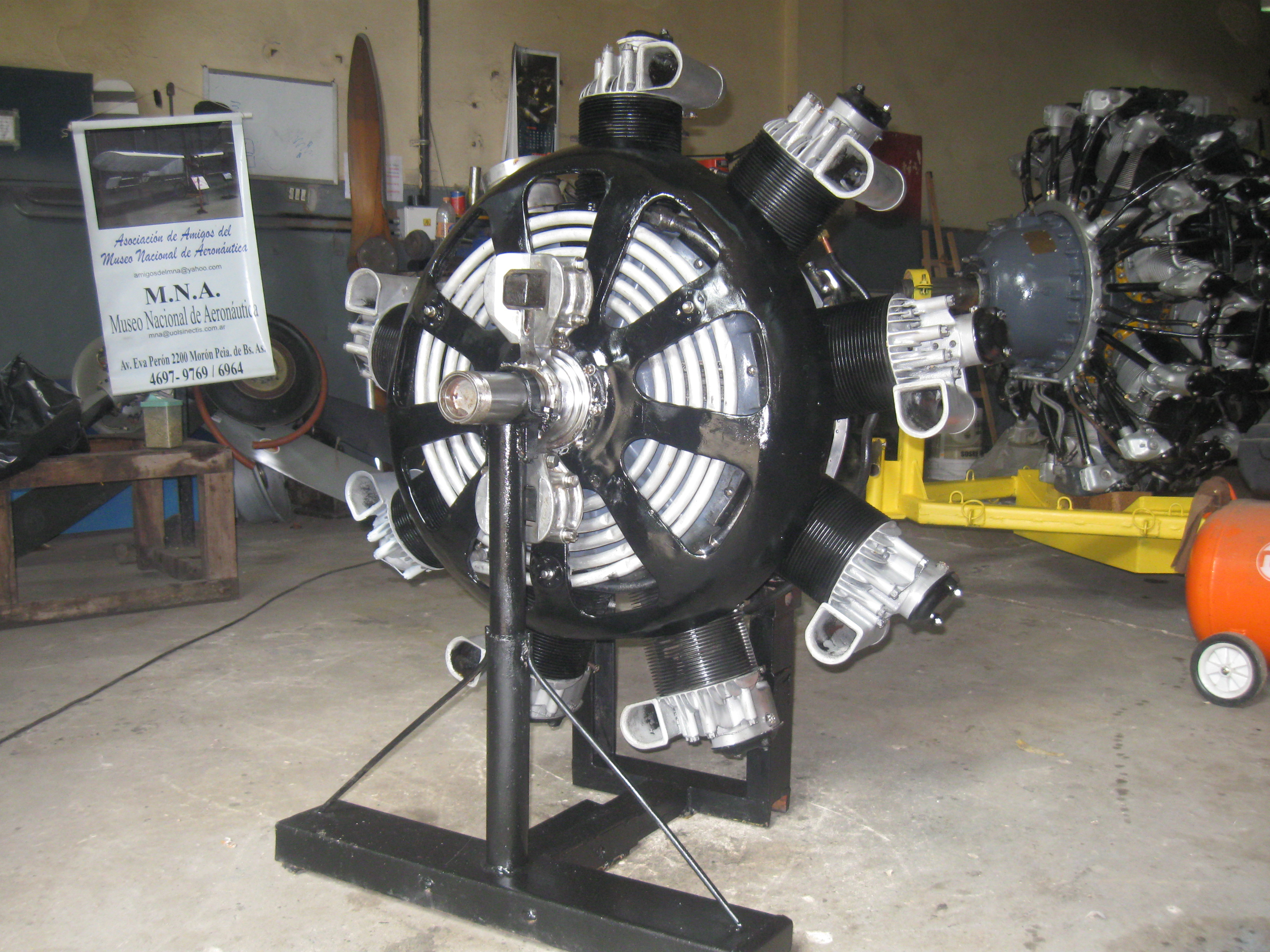
A Packard DR 980 at the Museo Nacional de Aeronáutica de Argentina

- Museo Nacional de Aeronáutica de Argentina
- National Museum of the United States Air Force.

== Specifications (DR-980) ==
Data from Aircraft Engine Historical Society

=== General characteristics ===
- Type: 9-cylinder Diesel radial engine
- Bore: 4 13/16 in (122.2 mm)
- Stroke: 6 in (152.4 mm)
- Displacement: 980 in³ (16 L)
- Dry weight: 550 lb (227 kg)

=== Components ===
- Valvetrain: One valve per cylinder, overhead valve
- Fuel type: Diesel oil
- Cooling system: Air-cooled

=== Performance ===
- Power output: 240 hp (179 kW) at 2,000 rpm
- Specific power: 0.25 hp/in³ (11.2 kW/L)
- Power-to-weight ratio: 0.44 hp/lb (0.8 kW/kg)

== See also ==
Comparable engines

- BMW 114
- Bristol Phoenix
- Guiberson A-1020

Related lists

- List of aircraft engines
