= Jim Szymanski =

American football player (born 1967)

No. 94
- Position: Defensive end

Personal information
- Born: September 7, 1967 (age 59); Sterling Heights, Michigan, U.S.
- Listed height: 6 ft 5 in (1.96 m)
- Listed weight: 268 lb (122 kg)

Career information
- High school: Adlai E. Stevenson (Sterling Heights)
- College: Michigan State
- NFL draft: 1990: 10th round, 259th overall pick

Career history
- Denver Broncos (1990–1991); Kansas City Chiefs (1992)*; Pittsburgh Steelers (1993)*
- * Offseason or practice squad member only
- Stats at Pro Football Reference

James Paul Szymanski (born September 7, 1967) is an American former professional football player who was a defensive end for the Denver Broncos of the National Football League (NFL) from 1990 to 1991. He played college football for the Michigan State Spartans and was selected by the Broncos in the 10th round of the 1990 NFL draft. In 1993, he was placed on injured reserve by the Pittsburgh Steelers.

Szymanski attended Adlai E. Stevenson High School in Sterling Heights, Michigan, graduating in 1985. He was honored in the school's 2024 Athletic Hall of Fame class. He was inducted homecoming weekend in September 2024.
