= Chris Liwienski =

American football player (born 1975)

No. 76, 63
- Position: Guard

Personal information
- Born: August 2, 1975 (age 51); Detroit, Michigan, U.S.
- Listed height: 6 ft 5 in (1.96 m)
- Listed weight: 325 lb (147 kg)

Career information
- High school: Adlai E. Stevenson (Sterling Heights, Michigan)
- College: Indiana
- NFL draft: 1998: 7th round, 207th overall pick

Career history
- Detroit Lions (1998)*; Minnesota Vikings (1998–2005); Arizona Cardinals (2006); Miami Dolphins (2007); Jacksonville Jaguars (2008)*
- * Offseason or practice squad member only

Career NFL statistics
- Games played: 126
- Games started: 94
- Fumble recoveries: 2
- Stats at Pro Football Reference

Chris Liwienski (born August 2, 1975) is an American former professional football player who was a guard in the National Football League (NFL). He was selected by the Detroit Lions in the seventh round of the 1998 NFL draft after playing college football for the Indiana Hoosiers.

Liwienski was also a member of the Minnesota Vikings, Arizona Cardinals, Miami Dolphins and Jacksonville Jaguars.

== Early life ==
Liwienski was a three-year letterman at Stevenson High School in Sterling Heights, Michigan, graduating in 1993. He was named All-conference, All-Metro and All-State as a senior and participated in the East/West All Star Game.

Liwienski was honored in the Adlai E. Stevenson High School's 2024 Athletic Hall of Fame class. He was inducted homecoming weekend in September 2024.

== College career ==
Liwienski was a three-year starter at offensive tackle for the Indiana Hoosiers. He started 36 games during four-year career, playing in 43.

After redshirting in 1993, Liwienski played in 10 of 11 games in 1994. He missed only the game against University of Illinois with a knee injury. He won his second and third letters in 1995 and 1996, respectively, and started all 11 games in 1996.

As a senior in 1997 and one of the Hoosiers' five team captains, Liwienski started all 11 regular season games at left tackle. He played in Hula Bowl following senior season and was also named the Chris Dal Sasso Award winner, given annually to the Indiana offensive lineman who best exemplifies the former Hoosier lineman's qualities.

== Professional career ==
=== Detroit Lions ===
Liwienski was originally drafted by the Detroit Lions in the seventh round (207th overall) of the 1998 NFL draft.

=== Minnesota Vikings ===
He was signed by the Minnesota Vikings and placed on the practice squad on August 21 after being released by Detroit. On November 11, Liwienski was promoted to the active roster. He saw his first NFL game action on extra point protection against the Jacksonville Jaguars on December 20. It was the only game he appeared in during his rookie season.

In 1999, Liwienski spent the first 12 games of the season on Minnesota's practice squad. He was moved to Vikings' active roster for the team's December 12 contest but was inactive. He remained inactive for the rest of the regular season as well as two postseason contests.

Liwienski saw his first significant playing time in 2000, appearing in 14 games and starting one. He was inactive for one game due to a knee injury. He started the season opener at left guard against the Chicago Bears on September 3, which happened to also be the first career start of longtime Vikings center Matt Birk. Liwienski also played in the team's Divisional Playoff game against the New Orleans Saints and the NFC Championship game at the New York Giants.

Liwienski became a full-time starter in 2001, participating in every snap at right tackle during the season (replacing the recently deceased Korey Stringer) despite being expected to play left guard. He was named to USA Today's All-Joe team, which recognizes unheralded players.

Liwienski remained at right tackle in 2002 and once again started all 16 regular season contests. He helped the Vikings rush for a team-record 26 touchdowns on the season, and helped second-year running back Michael Bennett post the second-best single-season rushing performance in team history with 1,296 yards. Against the Buffalo Bills on September 15, he helped Moe Williams rush for his first 100-yard rushing game as a Viking.

Upon the signing of offensive tackle Mike Rosenthal, Liwienski was moved back to left guard in 2003 and started all 16 games at the position. He helped pave the way for a Vikings offense that ranked first in the NFL for the first time in franchise history. Liwienski paved the way for Moe Williams, Michael Bennett and Onterrio Smith to each break the 100-yard mark during games in 2003.

Liwienski started all 16 games at guard in 2004, helping quarterback Daunte Culpepper throw for 4,717 yards and 39 scores. He was fined $2,500 – one of nine Vikings players fined in all – for his part in a scuffle with the Chicago Bears on September 26.

Battling injuries, Liwienski appeared in 15 games and started nine during the 2005 season. He had previously started every game for the Vikings from 2001 to 2004.

With the acquisition of Steve Hutchinson from the Seattle Seahawks, rumors persisted of Liwienski's inevitable release. The talk came to fruition on September 2, 2006, when he was released by the team he had started 74 of 94 games with since 1998.

=== Arizona Cardinals ===
Liwienski signed with the Arizona Cardinals two days later, reuniting him with then-head coach Dennis Green, who had coached Liwienski his first four seasons in Minnesota. He went on to start six of the 16 games in which he appeared, filling in for injured starters Oliver Ross and Milford Brown early in the season before becoming the starting left guard.

=== Miami Dolphins ===
As an unrestricted free agent, Liwienski was signed to a one-year contract by the Miami Dolphins on March 22, 2007. The move reunites him with Dolphins head coach Cam Cameron, who was the head coach at Indiana during Liwienski's senior season in 1997, as well as quarterback Daunte Culpepper, who played with Liwienski in Minnesota from 1999 to 2005.

=== Jacksonville Jaguars ===
Once again a free agent, Liwienski signed with the Jacksonville Jaguars on July 31, 2008, after they waived rookie quarterback Paul Smith. Liwienski was released on August 25 after the team signed running back Ciatrick Fason.

== Post-football career ==
After a life of football, Chris moved to Minnetonka, MN. There he enjoys relaxing with his wife and coaching his two children in various sports.

Chris continues to succeed outside of football, selling orthopedic implants for Zimmer Biomet.
