= Andrew Bogusz =

American racing driver

- Born: January 18, 2006 (age 20); Rochester Hills, Michigan, U.S.
- Height: 5 ft 10 in (178 cm)
- Awards: 2022 Must See Racing Midwest Lights Rookie of the Year 2020 Michigan Auto Racing Fan Club Youth Driver of the Year
- Website: https://www.andrewbogusz.com/

Signature
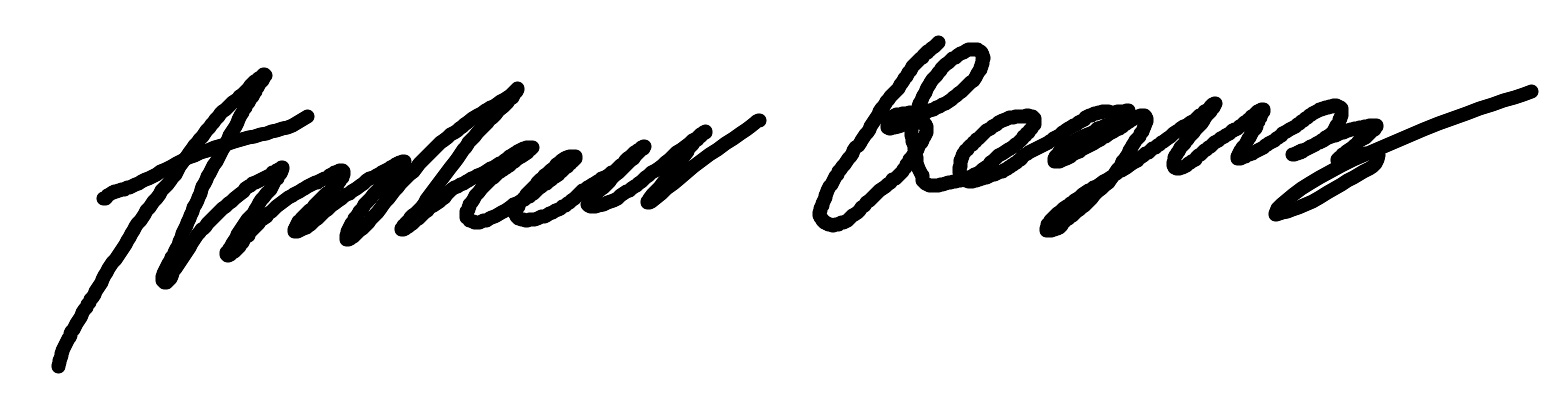

Andrew Karl Bogusz (born January 18, 2006) is an American racing driver. He competes full-time in the Tri-State Sprints series and the Grand Bend Speedway Weekly Series for Eddie Sachs Racing, driving the No. 17 winged sprint car. He had previously competed full-time in the Must See Racing Maxima Racing Oils Midwest Lights Series from 2022, driving for the same team to 2025.

== Early life and education ==
Bogusz was born and grew up in Shelby Charter Township, Michigan. He graduated from the Stevenson MADE Academy at Adlai E. Stevenson High School (Sterling Heights, Michigan) in 2024 He is a student at the Lawrence Technological University, studying for a Bachelor's of Science in mechanical engineering..

== Racing career ==
=== Early years ===
Bogusz started his career in 2019 racing quarter midgets at the age of 13. He joined Eddie Sachs Racing's Driver Development program. In the 2019 Rumble in Fort Wayne at the Allen County War Memorial Coliseum, he finished a best of 5th in the Heavy 160 division across the 2-day event. Before the start of 2020, Bogusz was awarded the Michigan Auto Racing Fan Club Youth Driver of the Year award for his rookie season.

Bogusz made the switch to dirt go-karts in 2021. He started competing at the Arthur Raceway in the Blue-Plate Clone division gathering 4 wins, and in the Blue-Plate Predator division gathering 8 wins, eventually winning that year's track championship in both divisions respectively.. Bogusz had also competed in the 2021 Rumble in Fort Wayne in the Junior 3 division with a best finish of 3rd across the two-day event.

=== Sprint car racing ===
In 2022, Bogusz and Eddie Sachs Racing announced that they would be moving up to sprint cars, competing full-time in the Must See Racing Maxima Racing Oils Midwest Lights Series for the upcoming season, alongside his former teammate, Charlie Baur. He won in his second start at the Kalamazoo Speedway on May 28, 2022, at the American Speed US Nationals. By the end of his rookie year, he had won twice and been awarded the Must See Racing Midwest Lights Rookie of the Year award. Over the course of four full-time seasons including 33 races, Bogusz gathered at total of seven wins, 31 top five and 33 top ten finishes, with a best points finish of third before the series was discontinued after the 2025 season. During this time, Bogusz also made select starts in the Must See Racing National 410 Touring Series, posting four top ten finishes, with a best finish of eighth at the Berlin Raceway in 2025.
