= W.F. Stewart Company =

American carriage and aircraft manufacturer

- Company type: Privately held company
- Industry: Automotive, Aerospace
- Founded: 1881
- Defunct: 1939
- Fate: Out of business
- Headquarters: Flint, Michigan, United States
- Products: Automobile and carriage bodies, light aircraft

The W.F. Stewart Company was an American carriage body and automotive body manufacturer founded in 1881 by William Francis Stewart and based in Flint, Michigan. The company specialized in the design and manufacture of wooden carriage bodies for horse-drawn transport and later automotive bodies. The company also briefly produced light aircraft, but went out of business in the Great Depression.

== History ==
Company founder William Francis Stewart was born on the family homestead farm near London, Ontario, Canada in 1846. He started his work life as an apprentice carriage maker with a series of companies. After the American Civil War ended he and his brother both moved to the United States and became journeyman carriage builders at a number of the leading manufacturers in New York City. In 1868 both brothers moved to Pontiac, Michigan and William Francis Stewart started working for carriage maker Parsons & Page there. He then moved to Flint, Michigan and was employed at Roosevelt & Stewart, with whom his brother was a partner. The two brothers did not get along well and William Francis Stewart returned to Pontiac and the employ of Parsons & Page until 1871 when he again moved to Flint to work for carriage maker W.A. Patterson Company.

William Francis Stewart worked for Patterson until 1881, when he left to start his own company, leasing the top floor of a small factory building in Pontiac, where he constructed carriage bodies and other sub-assemblies. Most of his work was sold to his former employer, W.A. Patterson. Stewart's work proved to be of good quality and his business soon expanded to include the Durant-Dort Carriage Company, the Flint Wagon Works, as well as the W.A. Patterson Co as customers. Stewart was able to expand his company, building a large new factory in Flint and a smaller plant in Bay City, Michigan to supply carriage builders in the Saginaw, Michigan district.

On 31 January 1893 the Pontiac plant suffered a boiler explosion that demolished the building and seriously injured many of the fifty workers at the plant. The factory was rebuilt under the supervision of one of Stewart's sons, Samuel Sidney Stewart, with the Flint operation taking up the work of the Pontiac plant. After the Pontiac operation was restored, Samuel Sidney Stewart continued as manager until 1898. In that year he returned to Flint and was joined there by his younger brother, a U.S. Army veteran of the Spanish–American War, William E. Stewart.

Since the two brothers did not get along well and wishing to retire, William Francis Stewart divided the company, creating the Flint Body Company for William E. Stewart to run. William Francis Stewart remained president of both companies, while his sons were made vice-presidents. W.F. Stewart Company comprised half of the Flint factory and the Pontiac operation, while the Flint Body Company ran the Bay City location and the other half of the Flint plant.

By the turn of the 20th century both enterprises turned their ambitions to horseless carriages and the potential for working in this new industry. William Francis Stewart was an initial investor in the Buick Motor Company and served for many years on its board of directors. William E. Stewart's Flint Body Company started producing wooden automotive bodies first and in 1903 sold 200 units to the Merchants' Specialty Company of New York City.

The demand for Buicks was big enough that car production was moved from Flint to Jackson, Michigan. When William C. Durant bought Buick in 1904 he returned the facility to Flint and W.F. Stewart Company constructed a new factory on the Buick Hamilton Farm complex. In 1908 the newly formed General Motors, which had taken over Buick, purchased Stewart's plant for US$240,000 in GM stock and then leased the building to Buick, with W.F. Stewart Company retaining their head offices in the complex.

The father, William Francis Stewart, died in 1911, leaving the companies to his two sons. William E. Stewart retained the Flint Body Company, while Samuel Sidney Stewart took over the W.F. Stewart Company. By the spring of 1912 Flint Body was in receivership, with liabilities of US$64,000. William E. Stewart eventually recovered from the loss and started the W.E. Stewart Manufacturing Company, becoming a Buick and General Motors supplier.

By 1916, during the First World War, the W.F. Stewart Company had doubled its size and Samuel Sidney Stewart was appointed to serve as a board member or officer of several companies, including as vice president of the Union Industrial Trust Company and on the boards of the Union Industrial Bank and Union Trust Savings Bank. He also became a major shareholder in General Motors. For his part William E. Stewart also became a major GM share holder and was on the board of the National Bank of Flint.

By the dawn of the 1920s the W.F. Stewart Company was still building a few parts for horse-drawn carriages but the majority of the company business was as an automotive supplier, building car bodies for Buick, Cadillac, Chevrolet, Dort Motor Car Company, Durant's Flint Division, Oakland Motor Car Company and the Peerless Motor Company. Due to changes in the industry and in particular GM's acquisition of Fisher Body, business volume shrunk and the company started to specialize in custom work.

In 1928, just after Charles Lindbergh's high-profile May 20–21, 1927 solo transatlantic flight, Samuel Sidney Stewart became interested in building aircraft as a means of diversification. A hangar at the corner of Saginaw and Maple Roads in Flint became the company's aviation division to build the prototype, John L. Hunt designed, Stewart M-1 monoplane. The design was not very aesthetically attractive and did not attract any orders for production examples.

In 1930 the second design flew. The Stewart M-2 was again a John Hunt design, assisted by Lionel Kitchen. This was a much more modern aircraft with twin engines, but it was introduced just as the Great Depression was in full swing and no orders were forthcoming.

Samuel Sidney Stewart still believed aviation had a bright future and collaborated with E.T. Strong, the president of Buick, in building the Bishop International Airport a project finished in 1934.

W.F. Stewart Company ceased operations in 1935, although the company existed until 1939 as a paper entity, a victim of the Great Depression.

== Aircraft ==
Summary of aircraft built by W.F. Stewart Company
Model name	First flight	Number built	Type
Stewart M-1	1927	one	Four-seat, single-engine monoplane
Stewart M-2	1930	one	Five-seat, twin-engine monoplane
