= Frank Zombo =

American football player (born 1987)

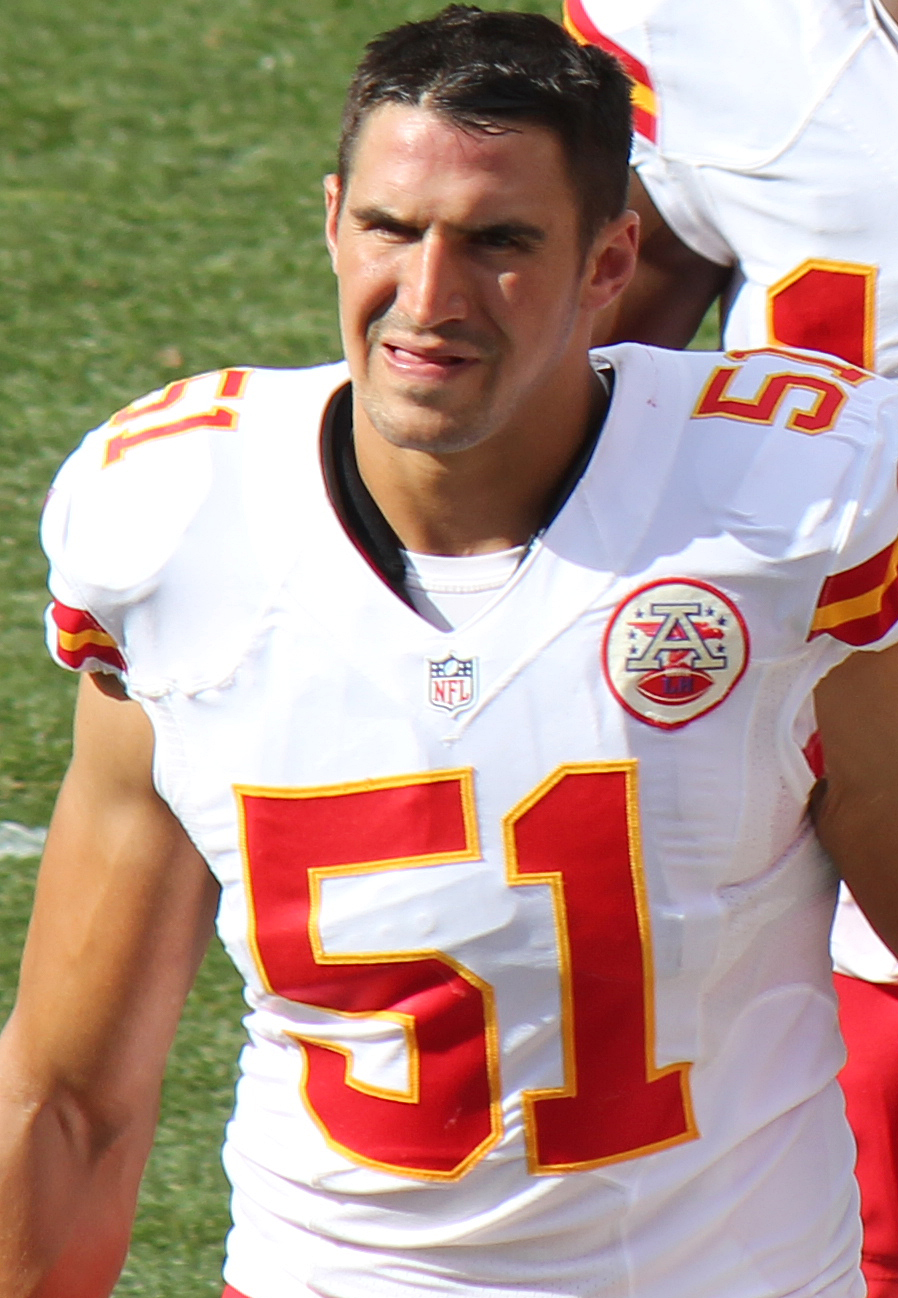
- Zombo with the Kansas City Chiefs in 2014

No. 58, 51
- Position: Linebacker

Personal information
- Born: March 5, 1987 (age 39); Sterling Heights, Michigan, U.S.
- Listed height: 6 ft 3 in (1.91 m)
- Listed weight: 254 lb (115 kg)

Career information
- High school: Adlai E. Stevenson (Sterling Heights)
- College: Central Michigan (2006–2009)
- NFL draft: 2010: undrafted

Career history
- Green Bay Packers (2010–2012); Kansas City Chiefs (2013–2018)

Awards and highlights
- Super Bowl champion (XLV); First-team All-MAC (2009)

Career NFL statistics
- Total tackles: 196
- Sacks: 12.5
- Forced fumbles: 5
- Fumble recoveries: 4
- Interceptions: 1
- Stats at Pro Football Reference

Frank William Zombo III (born March 5, 1987) is an American former professional football player who was a linebacker in the National Football League (NFL). He was signed by the Green Bay Packers as an undrafted free agent in 2010 and later won Super Bowl XLV with them over the Pittsburgh Steelers. He played college football for the Central Michigan Chippewas.

== Early life ==
Zombo graduated from Adlai E. Stevenson High School in 2005 where he also played high school football.

Zombo was honored in the Adlai E. Stevenson High School's 2024 Athletic Hall of Fame class. He was inducted homecoming weekend in September 2024.

== College career ==
Zombo was a four-year letterman at Central Michigan, appearing in all 55 games during his four seasons with 39 starts as a defensive end. He finished his career ranked second in school history with 25½ sacks. Zombo also earned 1st team All-MAC honors twice.

== Professional career ==
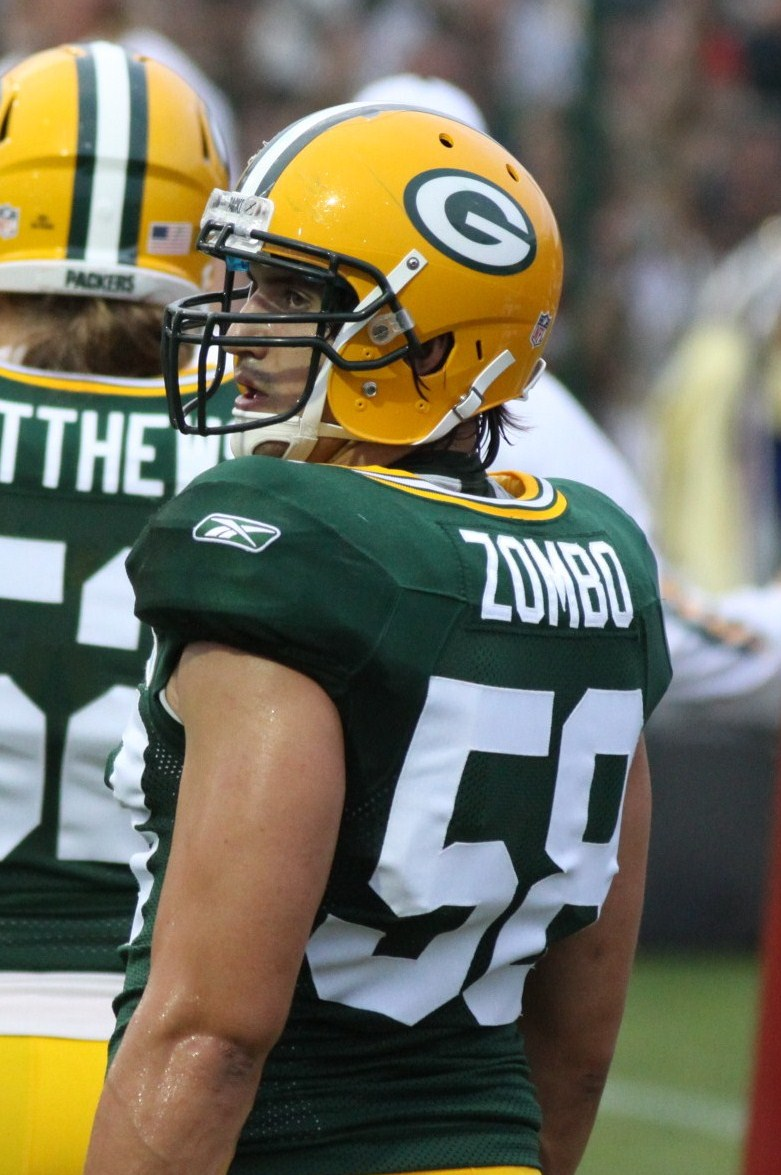
Zombo with the Green Bay Packers in 2011

=== Green Bay Packers ===
After going undrafted in the 2010 NFL draft, Zombo signed with the Green Bay Packers on April 30, 2010. In his NFL debut, Zombo recorded a sack against the Philadelphia Eagles in Week 1 of the 2010 season. As a rookie, he finished with four sacks, 38 total tackles, and two forced fumbles in 13 games in the 2010 season. In Super Bowl XLV, Zombo was a starter and recorded a sack as well as five tackles (two for a loss), as Green Bay defeated the Pittsburgh Steelers 31–25 to bring the Lombardi trophy back to Green Bay for the first time in 14 years.

In August 2011, Zombo suffered a broken shoulder blade. Zombo appeared in five games in the 2011 season. He recorded one sack, which came in Week 17 against the Detroit Lions.

In 2012, Zombo missed the first eight games of the season due to a hamstring injury, and was placed on the physically unable to perform list. Zombo was activated on November 3. He appeared in seven games in a defensive and special teams role.

=== Kansas City Chiefs ===
On April 3, 2013, Zombo signed with the Kansas City Chiefs. In the 2013 season, he recorded two sacks, 27 total tackles, one interception, two passes defended, one forced fumble, and one fumble recovery in 16 games and five starts. In the 2014 season, he appeared in all 16 games in primarily a special teams role. In the 2015 season, he appeared in all 16 games and made two starts. He finished with three sacks, 19 total tackles, and one forced fumble.

Zombo signed a three-year, $3.6 million contract extension in March 2016. In the 2016 season, Zombo finished with one sack, 41 total tackles, two passes defended, and one forced fumble in 16 games and 11 starts. In the 2017 season, he had 1.5 sacks, 43 total tackles, and one fumble recovery in 16 games and nine starts.

On September 1, 2018, Zombo was released by the Chiefs. He was re-signed by the Chiefs on October 9, 2018. He appeared in nine games in mainly a special teams role in the 2018 season.

== NFL career statistics ==
=== Regular season ===
Year	Team	Games		Tackles				Interceptions						Fumbles	
Year	Team	GP	GS	Comb	Total	Ast	Sck	SFTY	PDef	Int	Yds	Avg	Lng	TDs	FFum
2010	GB	13	8	36	28	10	4	-	0	-	-	0.0	-	-	2
2011	GB	5	1	10	8	2	1	-	0	-	-	0.0	-	-	0
2012	GB	7	0	8	5	3	0	-	0	-	-	0.0	-	-	0
2013	KC	16	5	27	23	4	2	-	2	1	5	5.0	5	0	1
2014	KC	16	0	8	8	0	0	-	0	-	0	0.0	-	-	0
2015	KC	16	2	19	16	3	3	-	0	-	-	0.0	-	-	1
2016	KC	16	11	41	30	11	1	-	2	-	-	0.0	-	-	1
2017	KC	16	9	43	26	17	1.5	-	0	-	-	0.0	-	-	0
2018	KC	9	0	2	2	0	0	-	0	-	0	0.0	-	-	0
Career		107	36	196	146	50	12.5	0	4	1	5	-	5	0	5
Source: NFL.com
