= Utica, Michigan =

- City
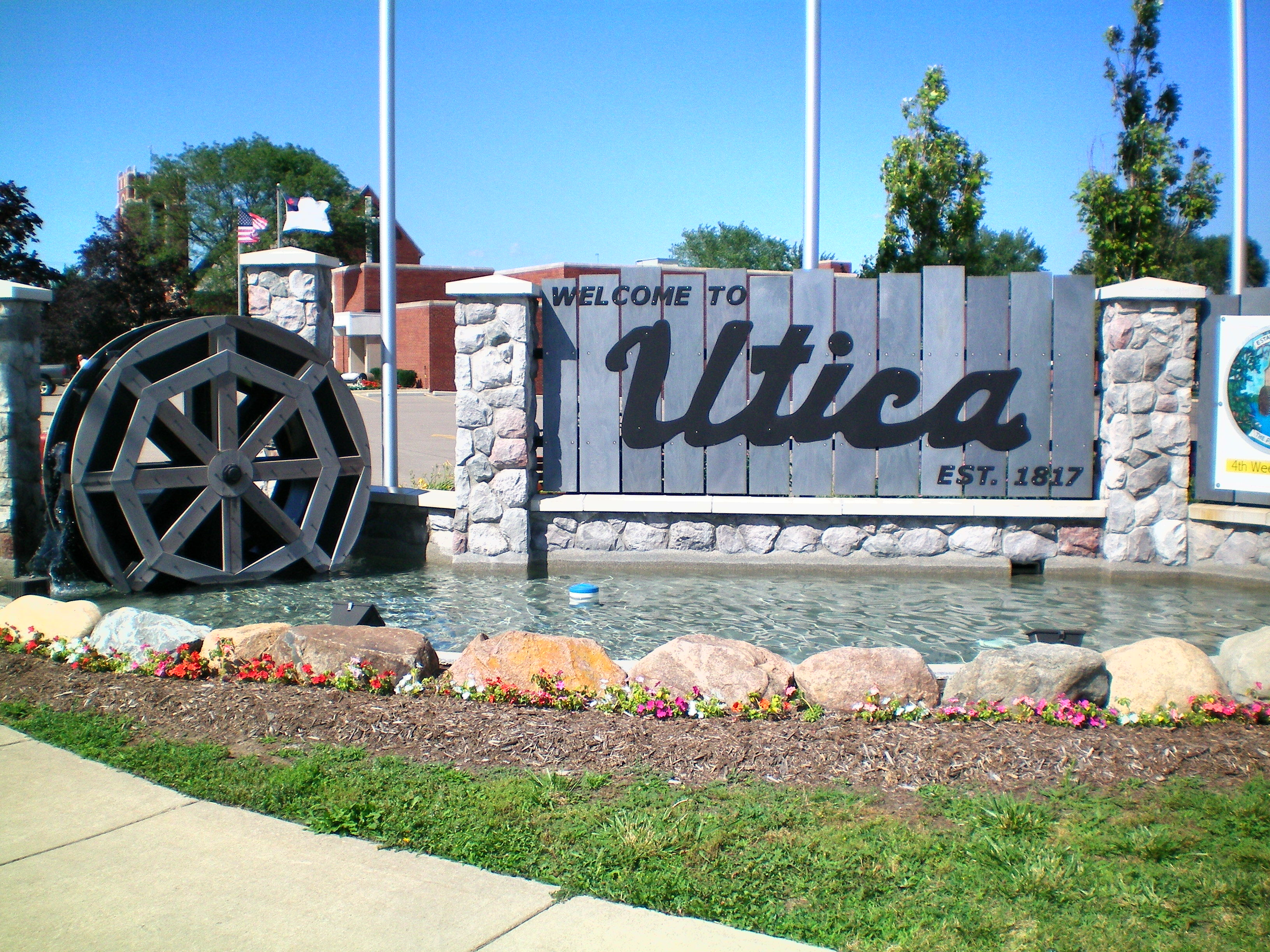
- Downtown Utica, Michigan welcome sign

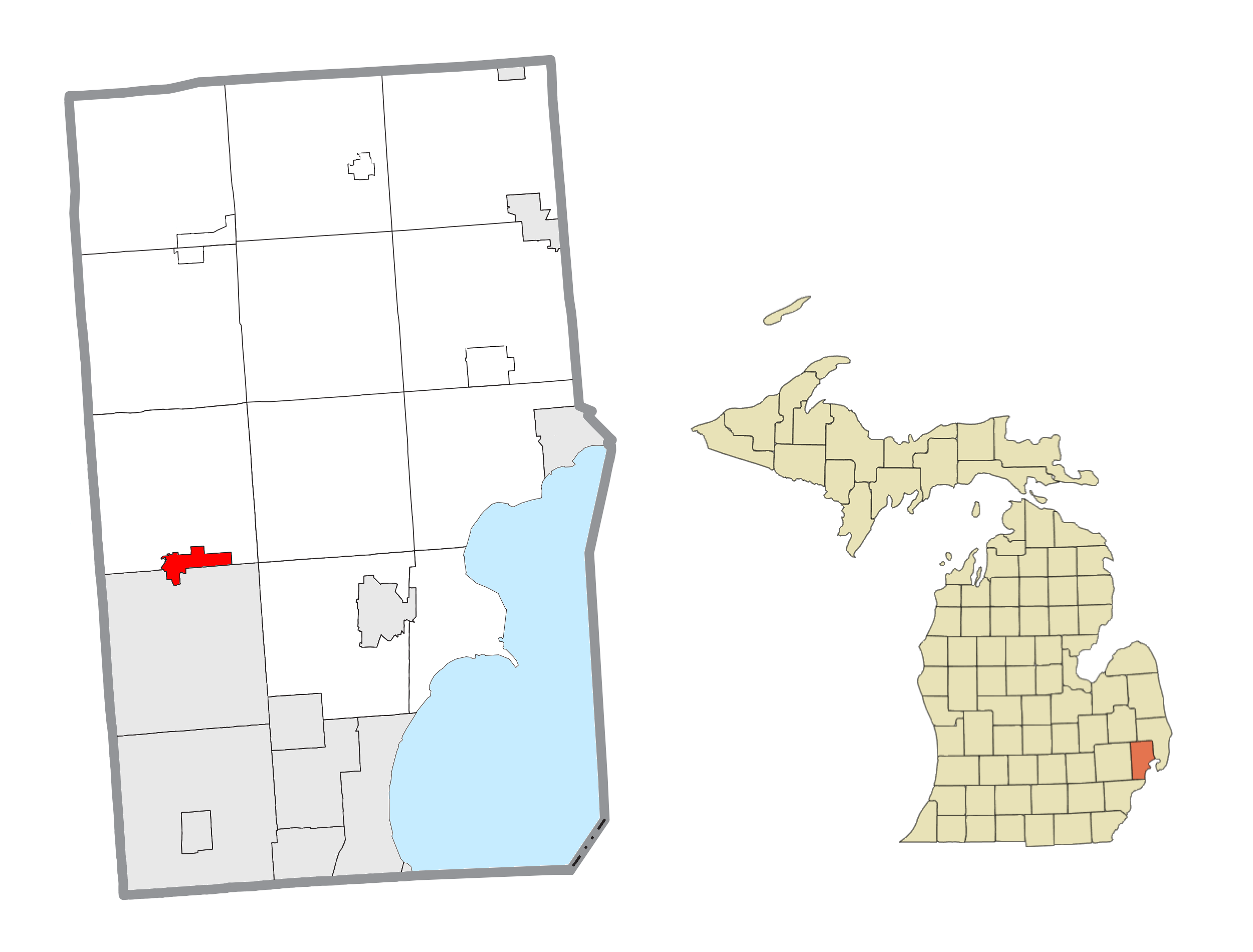
- Location within Macomb County

- Location within Michigan Location within the United States
- Coordinates: 42°37′46″N 83°01′22″W
- Country: United States
- State: Michigan
- County: Macomb

Government
  - Type: Strong mayor
  - Mayor: Gus Calandrino (D)

Area
  - Total: 1.78 sq mi (4.60 km^{2})
  - Land: 1.76 sq mi (4.56 km^{2})
  - Water: 0.019 sq mi (0.05 km^{2})
- Elevation: 650 ft (198 m)

Population (2020)
  - Total: 5,245
  - Density: 2,981.2/sq mi (1,151.03/km^{2})
- Time zone: UTC-5 (Eastern (EST))
  - Summer (DST): UTC-4 (EDT)
- ZIP Codes: 48315, 48317, 48318
- Area code: 586
- FIPS code: 26-81540
- GNIS feature ID: 1615434
- Website: cityofutica.org

Utica is a city in Macomb County in the U.S. state of Michigan. Its population was 5,245 at the 2020 census, up from 4,757 in 2010.

== History ==
The city now known as Utica was platted by Joseph Stead in 1829, who named it "Harlow". Others referred to the community as "Hog's Hollow" or "McDougalville", until a few years later it was named "Utica" by settlers from New York, in honor of the city of the same name in that state. This was common of settlers in this region, and is reflected in the names of nearby cities such as Rochester, Troy, and Livonia that are also named for Upstate New York cities and villages.

By the 1940s, Utica was the center of a region of dairy farms and truck gardens. It had a flour mill and shipped rhubarb. Dodge Park a few miles south on the Clinton River was a state park.

As the 1950s progressed, Detroit auto companies began to build factories in neighboring Sterling and Shelby Townships, and the surrounding area began a transformation to an industrial economy.

Utica boasts a small historic district centered on Cass Avenue and Auburn Road, but few of the buildings antedate 1906, due to destructive fires in 1905 and 1906.

== Geography ==
Utica is in western Macomb County, bordered to the south by the city of Sterling Heights and to the north by Shelby Charter Township. Highways M-53 and M-59 serve the city. M-53 crosses the east side of the city, leading north 13 miles (21 km) to Romeo and south 8 miles (13 km) to Warren, while M-59 runs along the southern border of the city, leading east 8 miles (13 km) to Interstate 94 and west 15 miles (24 km) to Pontiac. Downtown Detroit is 21 miles (34 km) to the south.

According to the U.S. Census Bureau, Utica has a total area of 1.78 square miles (4.61 km^{2}), of which 0.02 sq mi (0.05 km^{2}) is covered by water. The Clinton River passes through the center of the city, flowing southeast and then east to Lake St. Clair.

== Demographics ==
Historical population
Census	Pop.	Note	%±
1880	493		—
1890	563		14.2%
1900	562		−0.2%
1910	496		−11.7%
1920	588		18.5%
1930	873		48.5%
1940	1,022		17.1%
1950	1,196		17.0%
1960	1,454		21.6%
1970	3,504		141.0%
1980	5,282		50.7%
1990	5,081		−3.8%
2000	4,577		−9.9%
2010	4,757		3.9%
2020	5,245		10.3%
U.S. Decennial Census

=== 2020 census ===
As of the 2020 census, Utica had a population of 5,245. The median age was 43.3 years. 17.1% of residents were under the age of 18 and 20.7% of residents were 65 years of age or older. For every 100 females there were 87.7 males, and for every 100 females age 18 and over there were 85.7 males age 18 and over.

100.0% of residents lived in urban areas, while 0.0% lived in rural areas.

There were 2,469 households in Utica, of which 23.4% had children under the age of 18 living in them. Of all households, 36.0% were married-couple households, 22.4% were households with a male householder and no spouse or partner present, and 35.1% were households with a female householder and no spouse or partner present. About 40.2% of all households were made up of individuals and 17.7% had someone living alone who was 65 years of age or older.

There were 2,651 housing units, of which 6.9% were vacant. The homeowner vacancy rate was 1.0% and the rental vacancy rate was 10.3%.

Racial composition as of the 2020 census
Race	Number	Percent
White	4,191	79.9%
Black or African American	322	6.1%
American Indian and Alaska Native	12	0.2%
Asian	271	5.2%
Native Hawaiian and Other Pacific Islander	0	0.0%
Some other race	124	2.4%
Two or more races	325	6.2%
Hispanic or Latino (of any race)	220	4.2%

=== 2010 census ===
As of the census of 2010, 4,757 people, 2,218 households, and 1,245 families were living in the city. The population density was 2,781.9 inhabitants per square mile (1,074.1/km^{2}). The 2,463 housing units had an average density of 1,440.4 per square mile (556.1/km^{2}). The racial makeup of the city was 90.4% White, 1.9% African American, 0.5% Native American, 3.5% Asian, 1.9% from other races, and 1.8% from two or more races. Hispanics or Latinos of any race were 3.8% of the population.

Of the 2,218 households, 23.6% had children under 18 living with them, 37.8% were married couples living together, 14.0% had a female householder with no husband present, 4.3% had a male householder with no wife present, and 43.9% were not families. About 38.0% of all households were made up of individuals, and 15.9% had someone living alone who was 65 or older. The average household size was 2.13 and the average family size was 2.80.

The median age in the city was 41.7 years; The age distribution was 17.9% under 18; 8.8% from 18 to 24; 27.4% from 25 to 44; 28.3% from 45 to 64; and 17.4% were 65 or older. The gender makeup of the city was 47.4% male and 52.6% female.

=== 2000 census ===
As of the census of 2000, 4,577 people, 1,952 households, and 1,184 families resided in the city. The population density was 2,578.2 inhabitants per square mile (995.4/km^{2}). The 2,005 housing units had an average density of 1,129.4 per square mile (436.1/km^{2}). The racial makeup of the city was 93.77% White, 0.92% African American, 0.37% Native American, 2.56% Asian, 0.74% from other races, and 1.64% from two or more races. Hispanics or Latinos of any race were 2.10% of the population.

Of the 1,952 households, 27.2% had children under 18 living with them, 43.8% were married couples living together, 13.3% had a female householder with no husband present, and 39.3% were not families. About 34.2% of all households were made up of individuals, and 10.8% had someone living alone who was 65 or older. The average household size was 2.29 and the average family size was 2.96.

In the city, the age distribution was 21.0% under 18, 9.6% from 18 to 24, 31.7% from 25 to 44, 23.2% from 45 to 64, and 14.5% who were 65 or older. The median age was 37 years. For every 100 females, there were 92.9 males. For every 100 females 18 and over, there were 91.8 males.

The median income for a household in the city was $38,683, and for a family was $57,156. Males had a median income of $36,912 versus $26,353 for females. The per capita income for the city was $21,615. About 4.8% of families and 7.0% of the population were below the poverty line, including 6.7% of those under 18 and 17.3% of those 65 or over.

== Education ==
Utica Community Schools operates public schools, including Utica High School, Eppler Junior High School, Flickinger Elementary School, and Wiley Elementary School. They serve the communities of Sterling Heights, Utica, and Shelby Township.

== Notable people ==
- Charles Ronald Aldrich, architect
- Brian Barczyk, YouTube content creator
- Duke Maas, Major League Baseball pitcher
- Roda Selleck, painter and art instructor in Indianapolis schools
