= Duke Maas =

American baseball player (1929–1976)

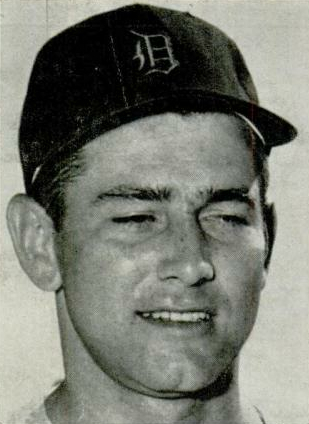
- Pitcher
- Born: January 31, 1929; Utica, Michigan, U.S.
- Died: December 7, 1976 (aged 47); Mount Clemens, Michigan, U.S.
- Batted: Right Threw: Right

MLB debut
- April 21, 1955, for the Detroit Tigers

Last MLB appearance
- April 23, 1961, for the New York Yankees

MLB statistics
- Win–loss record: 45–44
- Earned run average: 4.19
- Strikeouts: 356
- Stats at Baseball Reference

Teams
- Detroit Tigers (1955–1957); Kansas City Athletics (1958); New York Yankees (1958–1961)

Career highlights and awards
- World Series champion: (1958)

Duane Frederick "Duke" Maas (January 31, 1929 – December 7, 1976) was an American professional baseball player and right-handed pitcher who spent all or parts of seven seasons (1955–1961) in Major League Baseball with the Detroit Tigers, Kansas City Athletics and New York Yankees. Born in Utica, Michigan, he was listed as 5 feet 10 inches (1.78 m) tall and 170 pounds (77 kg).

Maas was a member of the 1958 World Series champion Yankees. He saw action in one game, relieving Bob Turley during the first inning of Game 2 when the Milwaukee Braves scored seven runs.

After making his big-league debut in 1955 with Detroit and then struggling through an 0–7 campaign in 1956, Maas put together a 10-win season in 1957. In a midseason transaction the following June, he and fellow pitcher Virgil Trucks were traded to the Yankees for outfielder Harry "Suitcase" Simpson and pitcher Bob Grim.

Maas got seven wins for New York in the second half of that pennant-winning season, then went 14–8 for them in 1959. He also pitched two innings of relief for the Yankees in the 1960 World Series against the Pittsburgh Pirates.

He was chosen by the Los Angeles Angels in the American League expansion draft prior to the 1961 season, but never played for them in a regular season game before being traded back to the Yankees, with whom he concluded his career.

For his career, he compiled a 45–44 record with a 4.19 earned run average and 356 strikeouts in 195 appearances.

Maas died in Mount Clemens, Michigan, at the age of 47 from complications due to arthritis.
