= Stewart M-1 =

American aircraft

M-1

General information
- Type: Sport Monoplane
- National origin: United States
- Manufacturer: W.F. Stewart Company
- Designer: John L. Hunt, Lionel Kitchen

History
- First flight: 1927

The Stewart M-1 Monoplane was the first of two aircraft designed and built by the W.F. Stewart Company, as their usual work of building custom wooden auto bodies was falling out of favor at that time.

== Design ==
The M-1 was a conventional landing gear equipped, all-wooden construction, mid-winged monoplane with two tandem open cockpits, each of which had side-by-side seating for a total of four people. It was powered by a 90 hp (67 kW) Curtiss OX-5 engine. The wing spar was made of spruce with mahogany veneer.

== Operational history ==
The prototype was test flown from 1928 to 1929. Production was canceled with the onset of the Great Depression. One owner operated the aircraft from Flint, Michigan until 1934. The prototype was dismantled in 1937.

== Specifications (Stewart M-1) ==
Data from Skyways

General characteristics

- Capacity: 4
- Length: 25 ft (7.6 m)
- Wingspan: 38 ft (12 m)
- Wing area: 200 sq ft (19 m^{2})
- Empty weight: 1,300 lb (590 kg)
- Gross weight: 2,253 lb (1,022 kg)
- Fuel capacity: 40 U.S. gallons (150 L; 33 imp gal)
- Powerplant: 1 × Curtiss OX-5 , 90 hp (67 kW)
- Propellers: 2-bladed

Performance

- Maximum speed: 91 kn (105 mph, 169 km/h)
- Cruise speed: 74 kn (85 mph, 137 km/h)
- Range: 350 nmi (400 mi, 640 km)
- Service ceiling: 15,000 ft (4,600 m)
