= Utica Community Schools =

School district in Macomb County, Michigan, U.S.

Address
- 11303 Greendale Sterling Heights, Macomb, Michigan, 48312; United States

District information
- Type: Public
- Grades: Pre-kindergarten through 12
- Superintendent: Robert S. Monroe
- Schools: 38
- Budget: $357,889,000 (2022-2023 expeditures)
- NCES District ID: 2634470

Students and staff
- Students: 25,297 (2024-25)
- Teachers: 1,416.49 FTE (2024-25)
- Staff: 2,870.16 FTE (2024-25)
- Student–teacher ratio: 17.86 (2024-25)

Other information
- Website: www.uticak12.org

Utica Community Schools (UCS) is a public school district located in Macomb County, Michigan in the Metropolitan Detroit area. UCS serves the city of Utica, the majority of Shelby Township, the northern portion of Sterling Heights, and parts of Ray, Washington, and Macomb townships. UCS is the second-largest school district in the state of Michigan.

== Schools ==
Schools in Utica Community Schools
Name	Address	Notes
High Schools
Adlai E. Stevenson High School	39701 Dodge Park Road, Sterling Heights	Grades 10-12
Dwight D. Eisenhower High School	6500 25 Mile Road, Shelby Twp.	Grades 10-12
Henry Ford II High School	11911 Clinton River Road, Sterling Heights	Grades 9-12
Utica High School	47255 Shelby Road, Shelby Twp.	Grades 9-12
Specialty Programs
Gene L. Klida Utica Academy For International Studies	37400 Dodge Park Road, Sterling Heights	Grades 9-12, formerly the Heritage Junior High School building. International Baccalaureate World School.
Stevenson MADE	39701 Dodge Park Rd, Sterling Heights	Manufacturing, Automation and Design Engineering program within Stevenson High School
Utica Alternative Learning Center	7600 18 Mile Road, Sterling Heights	Alternative school, grades 10-12.
Utica Center for Science and Industry	14201 Canal Road, Sterling Heights	Program for engineering technology, mechatronics and multimedia production.
Utica Center for Mathematics, Science and Technology	14201 Canal Road, Sterling Heights	STEM-focused program.
Utica High School Academy for Health and Human Services	47255 Shelby Road, Shelby Twp.	Medical/First-responder career program within Utica High School.
Junior High Schools
Bemis Junior High School	12500 19 Mile Road, Sterling Heights	Grades 7-8
Davis Junior High School	11300 17 Mile Rd., Sterling Heights	Grades 7-9
Eppler Junior High School	45461 Brownell, Utica	Grades 7-9
Jeannette Junior High School	40400 Gulliver, Sterling Heights	Grades 7-9
Malow Junior High School	6400 25 Mile Road, Shelby Twp.	Grades 7-9
Shelby Junior High School	51700 Van Dyke, Shelby Twp.	Grades 7-9
Elementary Schools
Beck Elementary	54600 Hayes, Macomb Twp.	Grades PreK-6
Beacon Tree Elementary	55885 Schoenherr, Sterling Heights	Grades PreK-6
Browning Elementary	12400 19 Mile Road, Sterling Heights	Grades PreK-6
Burr Elementary	41460 Ryan Road, Sterling Heights	Grades PreK-6
Collins Elementary	12900 Grand Haven, Sterling Heights	Grades PreK-6
Crissman Elementary	53550 Wolf Drive, Shelby Twp.	Grades PreK-6
DeKeyser Elementary	38397 Gladstone Dr., Sterling Heights	Grades PreK-6
Dresden Elementary	11400 Delvin Drive, Sterling Heights	Grades PreK-6
Duncan Elementary	14500 26 Mile Road, Shelby Twp.	Grades PreK-6
Ebeling Elementary	15970 Haverhill, Macomb Twp.	Grades PreK-6
Flickinger Elementary	45400 Vanker Drive, Utica	Grades PreK-6
Graebner Elementary	41875 Saal Road, Sterling Heights	Grades PreK-6
Harvey Elementary	41700 Montroy, Sterling Heights	Grades PreK-6
Havel Elementary	41855 Schoenherr, Sterling Heights	Grades PreK-6
Messmore Elementary	8742 Dill Drive, Sterling Heights	Grades PreK-6
Monfort elementary	6700 Montgomery Drive	Grades PreK-6
Morgan Elementary	53800 Mound Road, Sterling Heights	Grades PreK-6
Oakbrook Elementary	12060 Greenway, Sterling Heights	Grades PreK-6
Plumbrook Elementary	39660 Spalding, Sterling Heights	Grades PreK-6
Roberts Elementary	2400 Belle View, Shelby Twp.	Grades PreK-6
Schuchard Elementary	2900 Holly, Sterling Heights	Grades PreK-6
Schwarzkoff Elementary	8401 Constitution, Sterling Heights	Grades PreK-6
Switzer Elementary	53200 Shelby Road, Shelby Twp.	Grades PreK-6
West Utica Elementary	5415 West Utica Road, Shelby Twp.	Grades PreK-6
Wiley Elementary	47240 Shelby Road, Shelby Twp.	Grades PreK-6

== Transportation ==
Utica Community Schools employs 250 transportation personnel, and 12 district mechanics to service the school district's fleet of 250 district-owned school buses, as well as 75 other district-owned vehicles including their own wrecker. The UCS Transportation Department is responsible for transporting students to and from school, as well as providing transportation for over 3,000 annual off-site learning experiences. Each day throughout the school year, some 21,000 students will ride on a Utica Community School's school bus. Like many other school districts in Metro Detroit, Utica Community Schools follows a dash numbering scheme on their school buses, which declares the year that the bus manufactured in. (For example, bus 481-02 was manufactured in 2002.)

== See also ==
- Dean v. Utica
