= Henry Ford II High School =

Public school in Michigan, United States

Location
- 11911 Clinton River Road; Sterling Heights, Michigan 48313; United States
- 42°36′16″N 83°00′43″W

Information
- Type: High school
- Established: 1973
- School district: Utica Community Schools
- Principal: Lori Singleton
- Teaching staff: 83.80 (FTE)
- Grades: 9th–12th
- Enrollment: 1,627 (2023–2024)
- Student to teacher ratio: 19.42
- Colors: Maroon and gold
- Nickname: Falcons
- Website: ford.uticak12.org

Student assessments
- 2021–22 school year Change vs. prior year

M-STEP 11th grade proficiency rates (Science / Social Studies)
- Advanced %: 10.3 / 13.6
- Proficient %: 15.2 / 29.7
- PR. Proficient %: 11.9 / 42.3
- Not Proficient %: 62.6 / 14.4

Average test scores
- SAT Total: 995.6 (▲ +3.4)

Henry Ford II High School is a public high school located in the Metropolitan Detroit region in the city of Sterling Heights, Michigan, United States. It is a part of Utica Community Schools.

In 2004 Ford was recognized as a Michigan Blue Ribbon Exemplary School.

== History ==
This school is named after Henry Ford II, the executive officer of the Ford Motor Co. He was also a member of the New Detroit, Inc., Detroit Renaissance and a former chairman of the National Alliance of Businessmen. Ground was broken for HFII in 1971. Ford II opened with students in the fall of 1973. Ford II's inaugural graduating class of 1975 attended Eisenhower High School before coming to Ford II. The original design of the school had an open concept. The school had few windows and no walls in the individual wings. This open concept failed, as multiple classes could be heard at the same time. The building was quickly segmented into its current classroom structure. Today, the surrounding area is largely suburban (a part of Metro Detroit) and has subdivisions and strip-malls within the school's immediate proximity, most notably Lakeside Mall.

== Notable alumni ==
- Randy Farmer, game developer
- Jaime Greene, politician
- Brad Jones, NHL hockey player
- Craig Krenzel, NFL football player
