= Adlai E. Stevenson High School (Sterling Heights, Michigan) =

Public high school in Michigan, U.S.

Coordinates: 42.586368°N 83.010975°W

Location
- 39701 Dodge Park Road; Sterling Heights, Michigan 48313

Information
- Type: High School
- Established: 1967
- School district: Utica Community Schools
- Principal: Kenneth L. Cucchi III
- Teaching staff: 104.90 (on an FTE basis)
- Enrollment: 1,881 (2024–2025)
- Student to teacher ratio: 17.93
- Colors: Navy and white
- Mascot: Titans
- Rival: Eisenhower High School
- Website: http://stevenson.uticak12.org/

Student assessments
- 2021–22 school year Change vs. prior year

M-STEP 11th grade proficiency rates (Science / Social Studies)
- Advanced %: 14.8 / 9.8
- Proficient %: 18.1 / 19.2
- PR. Proficient %: 11.8 / 46.4
- Not Proficient %: 55.2 / 24.6

Average test scores
- SAT Total: 968.9 (▼ −17.4)

Adlai E. Stevenson High School is a public high school located in Sterling Heights, Michigan, a suburb of Detroit. Stevenson is a part of Utica Community Schools, Michigan's second largest school district.

The school was named for Adlai Stevenson II, a two-time candidate for President of the United States and former United Nations ambassador. In athletics, the school is often referred to as Sterling Heights Stevenson to differentiate from Adlai E. Stevenson High School in nearby Livonia, Michigan. The school's mascot is the "Titans."

== School information ==
Stevenson High School newspaper is called The Vanguard and its yearbook is called The Ambassador.

Stevenson High School's motto is The School of Champions.

== Athletics ==
The Titans are a Division 1 School in the MHSAA and compete in The Macomb Area Conference in lacrosse, competitive cheerleading, football, marching band, baseball, basketball, bowling, cross country, dance team, golf, soccer, softball, swimming, tennis, track, and volleyball.

NHL Professional Hockey players Derian and Kevin Hatcher both hail from Stevenson.

The school created an athletic hall of fame, celebrating their first class in 2023. Eight former athletes and two former coaches were honored, including Dan Jilek and Pete Chryplewicz. The 2024 Fall of Fame class included 4 athletes including Frank Zombo, Jim Szymanski, and Chris Liwienski, along with 3 coaches, and one contributor who served as the "Voice of the Titans" for over 30 seasons. This year also included the 1985 Girls Cross Country Team.

== Notable alumni ==
- Giovanni El-Hadi, college football offensive guard for the Michigan Wolverines
- Andrew Bogusz, racing driver
