= Sterling Heights, Michigan =

City in Michigan, United States

- City
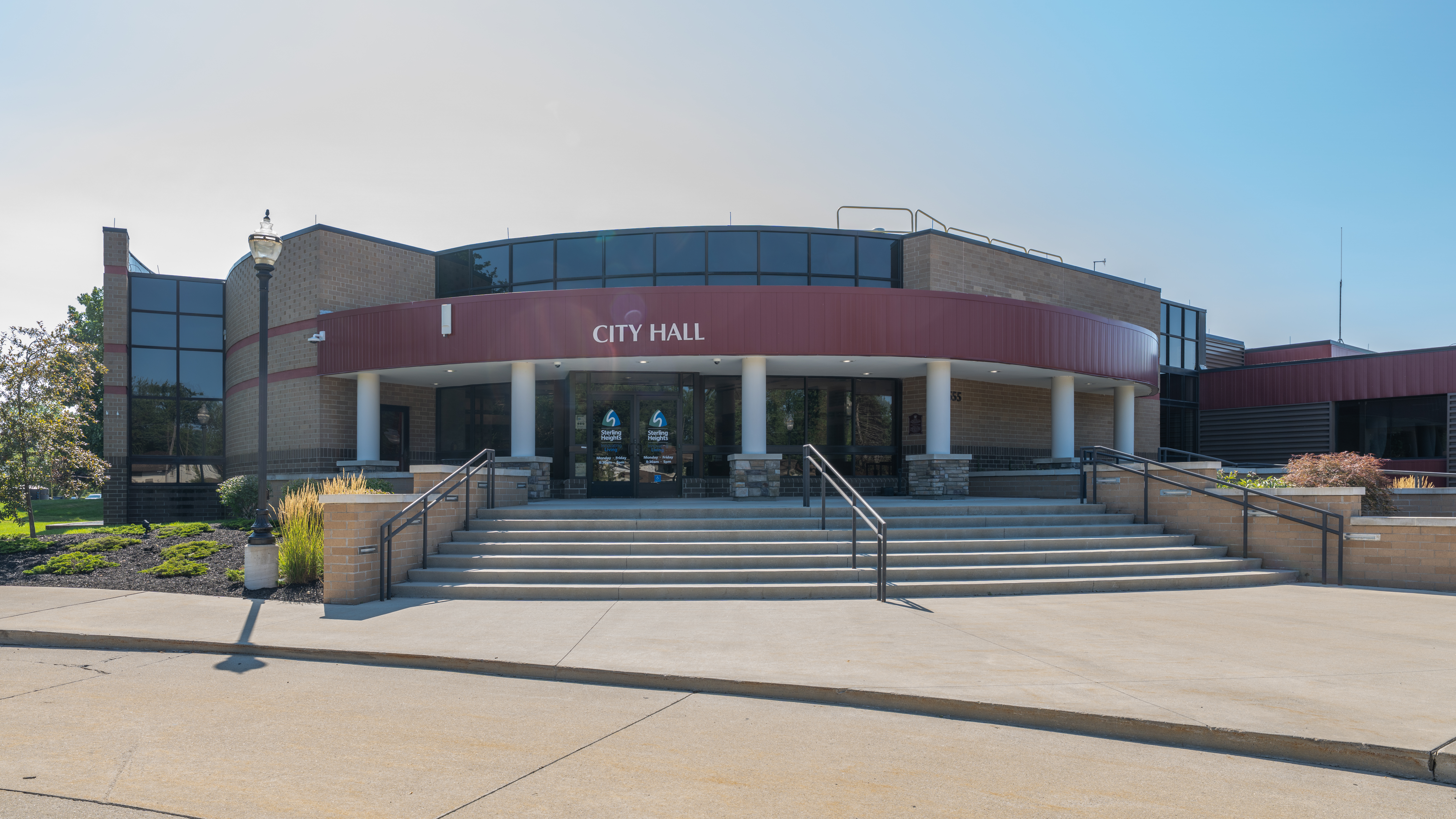
- Sterling Heights City Hall (2026)
- Motto: To Strive on Behalf of All
- Interactive map of Sterling Heights, Michigan
- Location within Michigan Location within the United States
- Coordinates: 42°34′47″N 83°01′41″W
- Country: United States
- State: Michigan
- County: Macomb
- Incorporated: 1968 (58 years ago), as a city

Government
  - Type: Council–manager
  - Mayor: Michael C. Taylor (I)
  - City manager: Mark D. Vanderpool
  - City Council: Members: Liz Sierawski (D) – Mayor Pro Tem; Deanna Koski (I) – At Large; Michael V. Radtke Jr (D) – At Large; Maria G. Schmidt (I) – At Large; Henry Yanez (D) – At Large; Barbara A. Ziarko (D) – At Large

Area
  - Total: 36.72 sq mi (95.10 km^{2})
  - Land: 36.45 sq mi (94.40 km^{2})
  - Water: 0.27 sq mi (0.70 km^{2})
- Elevation: 614 ft (187 m)

Population (2020)
  - Total: 134,346
  - Density: 3,686.0/sq mi (1,423.18/km^{2})
- Time zone: UTC−5 (Eastern (EST))
  - Summer (DST): UTC−4 (EDT)
- ZIP Codes: 48310, 48311, 48312, 48313, 48314
- Area code: 586
- FIPS code: 26-76460
- GNIS feature ID: 0638798
- Website: sterlingheights.gov

Sterling Heights is a city in Macomb County in the U.S. state of Michigan. A northern suburb of Detroit, Sterling Heights is located roughly 18 miles (29.0 km) north of Downtown. As of the 2020 census, the city had a population of 134,346, placing Sterling Heights as the second-largest suburb of Detroit and the fourth-most populous city in Michigan.

== History ==
As a result of the War of 1812 and the 1817 Treaty of Fort Meigs, the area of the Michigan Territory which now makes up Sterling Heights was first surveyed by Deputy Surveyor Joseph Wampler; his survey was approved on February 20, 1818. Wampler had been one of two deputy surveyors of Perrysburg, Ohio, in 1816.

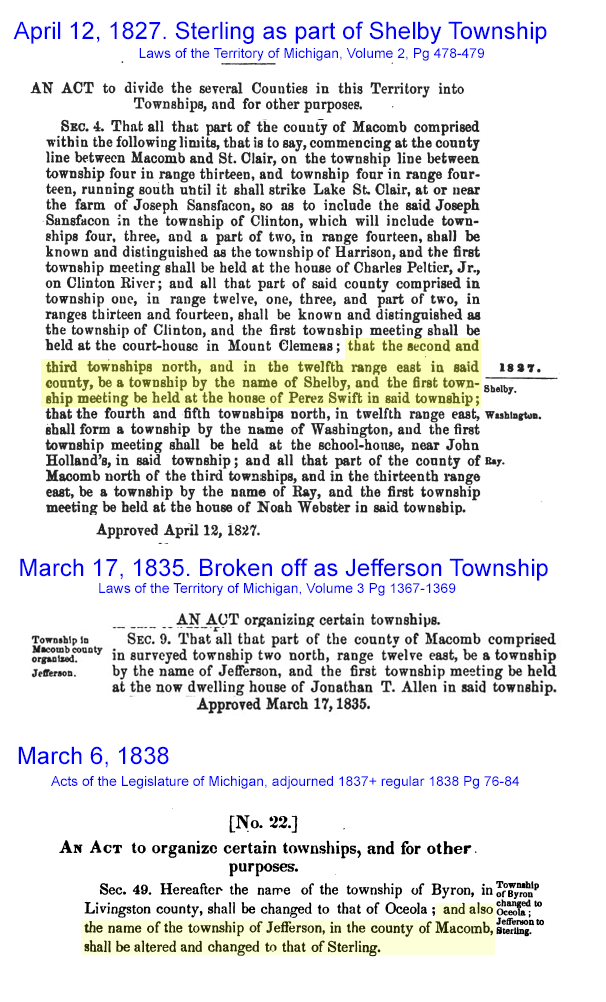
Acts which created & modified Sterling Township

Originally created as part of Shelby Township in April 1827, it was broken off as Jefferson Township in March 1835. In March 1838, it was renamed Sterling Township.

Until the 1950s, Sterling Township was an agricultural area, largely devoted to growing rhubarb and other crops sold in Detroit. Road improvements led to decreased commute times and lower costs for the delivery of goods and services to and from businesses. The population increased when suburban homes were built for the workers in metropolitan Detroit's booming automobile industry, also becoming a prime destination for white flight from Detroit which had begun to occur at the time. When Sterling Township was incorporated as a city in 1968, "Heights" was added to the name to satisfy a state law that prevents incorporated municipalities from having the same name, as there was already a small village named Sterling in Arenac County.

Gerald Donovan became the first mayor of the city and F. James Dunlop became the first mayor pro-tempore. In the 1960s and 1970s, many residents came to live in Sterling Heights to work in automobile plants operated by Chrysler and Ford. Lakeside Mall opened in Sterling Heights in 1976.

The city is home to many groups of immigrants. It has received many people of eastern European origins, including ethnic Albanians, Bosnians, Croatians, Macedonians, Montenegrins, Poles, Serbians and Slovenians. After the 2003 U.S.-Iraqi War, millions of Iraqi citizens were displaced, particularly Assyrians, whom the majority of which adhere to the Chaldean Catholic Church. Of these, 30,000-50,000 resettled in Sterling Heights, giving parts of the city the nickname "Little Nineveh", especially around 15 Mile Road and Ryan.

== Geography ==
Sterling Heights is a second-ring suburb, 14 to 20 miles (23 to 32 km) north of downtown Detroit. The city's southern border is 6 miles (10 km) from Detroit's northern border. The shape of the city is six miles long and miles wide. It is bordered to the south by the city of Warren, at its southwest corner by Madison Heights, to the west by Troy, to the north by Utica and Shelby Township, at its northeast corner by Macomb Township, to the east by Clinton Township, and to the southeast by Fraser.

According to the U.S. Census Bureau, Sterling Heights has a total area of 36.72 square miles (95.10 km^{2}), of which 36.45 square miles (94.41 km^{2}) are land and 0.27 square miles (0.70 km^{2}), or 0.74%, are water. The Clinton River crosses the northeast part of the city, flowing east to Lake St. Clair east of Mount Clemens.

=== Climate ===
Sterling Heights features a humid continental climate (Köppen: Dfa). Summers are somewhat hot with temperatures exceeding 90 °F (32 °C) on average 8.6 days. Winters are cold, with temperatures not rising above freezing on 39.1 days annually, while dropping to or below 0 °F (−18 °C) on average 1.2 days a year.

Climate data for Sterling Heights (Eastpointe station)
Month	Jan	Feb	Mar	Apr	May	Jun	Jul	Aug	Sep	Oct	Nov	Dec	Year
Mean daily maximum °C (°F)	0.4 (32.8)	2.1 (35.8)	7.1 (44.7)	14.6 (58.3)	20.9 (69.7)	26.7 (80.0)	29.0 (84.2)	27.6 (81.7)	23.8 (74.8)	16.8 (62.3)	9.4 (49.0)	2.5 (36.5)	15.1 (59.1)
Daily mean °C (°F)	−3.6 (25.5)	−2.6 (27.3)	1.7 (35.0)	8.4 (47.2)	14.8 (58.6)	20.5 (68.9)	22.9 (73.3)	21.8 (71.3)	17.7 (63.9)	11.2 (52.1)	4.9 (40.8)	−1.3 (29.7)	9.7 (49.5)
Mean daily minimum °C (°F)	−7.7 (18.2)	−7.3 (18.8)	−3.7 (25.3)	2.2 (36.0)	8.6 (47.5)	14.3 (57.7)	16.8 (62.3)	16.0 (60.8)	11.6 (52.9)	5.5 (41.9)	0.3 (32.5)	−5.1 (22.9)	4.3 (39.7)
Average precipitation mm (inches)	47 (1.86)	46 (1.82)	58 (2.27)	78 (3.07)	82 (3.23)	86 (3.38)	82 (3.22)	86 (3.38)	88 (3.45)	70 (2.75)	77 (3.05)	63 (2.49)	863 (33.97)
Source: NOAA (normals 1981–2010)

=== Main highways ===
Sterling Heights sits on two main thoroughfares:

==== State highways ====
- M-53 commonly called Van Dyke Avenue or the Van Dyke Freeway (they split in the city, however, and rejoin to its north), which leads north into The Thumb of Michigan.
- M-59, commonly called Hall Road once the freeway ends—which is the east–west connector from just north of Mount Clemens, through Utica as a surface road, and then becomes a limited access freeway to Pontiac, being the main northern connector between Macomb County and Oakland County. In Sterling Heights, large areas are devoted to retail and commercial development (e.g., Lakeside Mall).

==== Other main roads ====
- Mound Road is an important north–south artery that runs continuously through the city. Overall, the road starts south in Hamtramck and runs up to 32 Mile Road in Romeo. The road ends briefly at River Bends Park in Shelby Township (becoming Auburn Road), and continues just north of 22 Mile Road.
- East–west travel is mainly on the "mile roads", beginning at 14 Mile Road through 20 Mile Road (M-59). 16 Mile Road, also known as Metro Parkway, is another major "mile road". See Roads and freeways in metropolitan Detroit.
- Utica Road is an important diagonal connector that crisscrosses the city from southeast to northwest, going through the intersection of Dodge Park Road (across from the Sterling Heights city hall) via the first roundabout in Macomb County.
- Dequindre Road is the border between the city of Sterling Heights and the city of Troy. It is also the border between the counties of Macomb and Oakland.
- Hayes Road is the divider between Clinton Township (between Utica Road and South of M59) and Fraser (between Masonic and Moravian).

== Demographics ==
Historical population
Census	Pop.	Note	%±
1940	3,648		—
1950	6,509		78.4%
1960	14,622		124.6%
1970	61,365		319.7%
1980	108,999		77.6%
1990	117,810		8.1%
2000	124,471		5.7%
2010	129,699		4.2%
2020	134,346		3.6%
U.S. Decennial Census; 2018 Estimate

=== 2020 census ===
Sterling Heights, Michigan – Racial and ethnic composition Note: the US Census treats Hispanic/Latino as an ethnic category. This table excludes Latinos from the racial categories and assigns them to a separate category. Hispanics/Latinos may be of any race.
Race / Ethnicity (NH = Non-Hispanic)	Pop 2000	Pop 2010	Pop 2020	% 2000	% 2010	% 2020
White alone (NH)	111,743	108,750	106,149	89.77%	83.85%	79.01%
Black or African American alone (NH)	1,602	6,638	8,709	1.29%	5.12%	6.48%
Native American or Alaska Native alone (NH)	239	246	200	0.19%	0.19%	0.15%
Asian alone (NH)	6,100	8,713	10,935	4.90%	6.72%	8.14%
Native Hawaiian or Pacific Islander alone (NH)	35	16	13	0.03%	0.01%	0.01%
Other race alone (NH)	122	158	337	0.10%	0.12%	0.25%
Mixed race or Multiracial (NH)	2,965	2,655	4,728	2.38%	2.05%	3.52%
Hispanic or Latino (any race)	1,665	2,523	3,275	1.34%	1.95%	2.44%
Total	124,471	129,699	134,346	100.00%	100.00%	100.00%

According to the 2020 Census, a total of 13,641 individuals registered as Chaldean alone or in any combination in the city, while those identifying as Assyrian accounted for a further 1,174.

=== 2010 census ===
As of the census of 2010, there were 129,699 people, 49,451 households, and 34,515 families living in the city. The population density was 3,552.4 inhabitants per square mile (1,371.6/km^{2}). There were 52,190 housing units at an average density of 1,429.5 per square mile (551.9/km^{2}). The racial makeup of the city was 85.1% White, 5.2% African American, 0.2% Native American, 6.7% Asian, 0.5% from other races, and 2.2% from two or more races; 1.9% of the population were Hispanic or Latino of any race were.

There were 49,451 households, of which 31.0% had children under the age of 18 living with them, 55.0% were married couples living together, 10.5% had a female householder with no husband present, 4.3% had a male householder with no wife present, and 30.2% were non-families. 26.5% of all households were made up of individuals, and 10.7% had someone living alone who was 65 years of age or older. The average household size was 2.61 and the average family size was 3.20.

The median age in the city was 40.4 years. 21.7% of residents were under the age of 18; 8.8% were between the ages of 18 and 24; 25.8% were from 25 to 44; 28.6% were from 45 to 64; and 15.2% were 65 years of age or older. The gender makeup of the city was 48.5% male and 51.5% female.

=== 2000 census ===
As of the census of 2000, there were 124,471 people, 46,319 households, and 33,395 families living in the city. The population density was 3,397.0 inhabitants per square mile (1,311.6/km^{2}). There were 47,547 housing units at an average density of 1,297.6 per square mile (501.0/km^{2}). The racial makeup of the city was 90.70% White, 1.30% African American, 0.21% Native American, 4.92% Asian, 0.04% Pacific Islander, 0.34% from other races, and 2.50% from two or more races; 1.34% of the population were Hispanic or Latino of any race.

Ancestries: Polish (19.0%), German (14.4%), Italian (12.5%), Macedonian (5.7%), English (5%), Chaldo-Assyrians (20.7%), American/US (4%), and Irish (4%).

In 2000, there were more people in Sterling Heights born in Iraq than any other foreign country. In that year there were 5,059 people in Sterling Heights born in Iraq. The next three largest nations of foreign birth were North Macedonia at 1,723, Italy at 1,442 and Poland at 1,427.

There were 46,319 households, out of which 32.9% had children under the age of 18 living with them, 60.4% were married couples living together, 8.5% had a female householder with no husband present, and 27.9% were non-families. 24.1% of all households were made up of individuals, and 8.5% had someone living alone who was 65 years of age or older. The average household size was 2.66 and the average family size was 3.21.

In the city, the population was spread out, with 24.1% under the age of 18, 8.5% from 18 to 24, 30.4% from 25 to 44, 25.2% from 45 to 64, and 11.8% who were 65 years of age or older. The median age was 37 years. For every 100 females, there were 96.0 males. For every 100 females age 18 and over, there were 92.6 males.

The median income for a household in the city was $60,494, and the median income for a family was $70,140. Males had a median income of $51,207 versus $31,489 for females. The per capita income for the city was $24,958. About 4.0% of families and 5.2% of the population were below the poverty line, including 6.6% of those under age 18 and 7.5% of those age 65 or over.

== Law and government ==
The city has a council-manager form of government. The mayor, along with six other council members, is directly elected to council by the city residents. Prior to 2021, city council and mayoral positions had two-year terms. Following the approval of a ballot proposal in the November 2020 election the positions were changed to be four-year terms starting with the 2021 election cycle.

As of January 2021, the mayor was Michael C. Taylor. Taylor served as mayor pro tempore after Richard Notte died while in office in December 2014. Notte was the city's longest-serving mayor, winning in 1993 and serving through the next 11 consecutive elections. He was the city's first mayor to be elected by popular vote. Following his death, the municipal building was renamed the Richard J. Notte Sterling Heights City Center.

The city manager, Mark Vanderpool, has served as the city manager since 2004. In December 2020, the City Council voted to increase Vanderpool's salary by 23%, making him the third highest-paid city administrator of similar cities in Michigan. The position is appointed by the mayor and the city council.

Sterling Heights is located in Michigan's 57th House of Representatives district and Michigan's 58th House of Representatives district, District 57 is represented by Republican Thomas Kuhn and District 58 is represented by Republican Ron Robinson. The city is located in Michigan's 9th Senate district, represented by Republican Michael Webber.

Nationally, Sterling Heights is situated in Michigan's 10th congressional district, represented by Republican John James.

In the 2020 presidential election, 70,204 ballots were cast, with incumbent Donald Trump receiving 38,451 votes (54.77%) to Joe Biden's 30,587 votes (43.56%).

=== Mayors ===
- Gerald N. Donovan, 1968–1971
- Al Martin, 1972–1973
- Anthony Dobry, 1974–1981
- Jerry Mann, 1982–1983
- Arthur Madar, 1984–1985
- Jean DiRezze Gush, 1986–1991
- Stephen M. Rice, 1992–1993
- Richard J. Notte, 1994–2014
- Michael C. Taylor, 2015–2024

== Crime ==
Sterling Heights
- Crime rates* (2019)

Violent crimes
- Homicide: 0
- Rape: 18.74
- Robbery: 12.75
- Aggravated assault: 93.72
- Total violent crime: 125.21

Property crimes
- Burglary: 68.98
- Larceny-theft: 713.77
- Arson: 5.25
- Total property crime: 854.72
- Note: Reported crimes per 100,000 population Source: 2019 FBI Report of Offenses Known to Law Enforcement

The Sterling Heights Police Department serves as the main law enforcement agency in the city.

Sterling Height's crime rate for 2018 was 180.38 per 100,000 population, a 2.16% decrease from 2017. Sterling Heights' crime rate is lower than both the Michigan (449) and United States (381) averages. Sterling Heights had the fourth lowest crime rate per 100,000 population in 2018, compared to surrounding cities. Sterling Heights was beat by Rochester (61.19), Troy (61.74), and Fraser (157.25).

Sterling Heights has a lower crime rate than Utica (222.27), Madison Heights (295.68), Clinton Township (317.93), and Warren (509.03).

== Education ==
Sterling Heights is served by two public school districts: Utica Community Schools, which serves the northern half of the city, and Warren Consolidated Schools, which serves the southern half of the city. Utica operates two high schools in the city, Stevenson High School and Henry Ford II High School, while Warren Consolidated operates Sterling Heights High School. Additionally, Parkway Christian School, a private K–12 Christian school, is also located in the city.

== Media ==
The city of Sterling Heights has three local newspapers, The Macomb Daily with daily and Sunday delivery (owned by the Journal Register Company), the Sterling Heights Sentry (C and G Newspapers), and the Sterling Heights Source (owned by Advisor & Source Newspapers), the last two are delivered to city residences free of charge. The city also has two local channels. SHTV is run by the city's community relations department and usually features locally produced programming (including City Council meetings) and community announcements. Another channel is used for the Sterling Heights Public Library, which usually features educational programs as well as library announcements and important outreach programs for the LGBT community in Sterling Heights. SHTV is found locally on Comcast channel 5, on Wide Open West channel 10 and online. The public library channel is found on Comcast channel 12 and WOW channel 20.

The city's official radio station is AM 1700. The city also releases a seasonal magazine and a city calendar free of charge to each city household and business.

WKEG, affiliated with Relevant Radio, is based in Sterling Heights.

== Sister cities ==
Sister City initiatives give opportunities for the cities' residents to come to know each other's cultures. The initiatives will facilitate the cultural, educational, municipal, business, professional and technical exchanges and projects among the sister cities. Sterling Heights' sister cities are:

- Tetovo, North Macedonia (1982)
- Legazpi, Philippines (1999)
- Cassino, Italy (2006)
- Sorsogon City, Philippines (2008)
- Sant'Elia Fiumerapido, Italy (2010)
- Shëngjin, Albania (2013)
- Jaffna, Sri Lanka (2016)
- Ankawa, Iraq (2024)

== Notable people ==
- Porcelain Black (Alaina Marie Beaton) – industrial-pop singer
- Matt Busch – filmmaker and Star Wars artist
- Pete Chryplewicz – former NFL player
- Shawn Hunwick – retired NHL goaltender
- Tom Jankiewicz – screenwriter; raised in Sterling Heights
- Craig Krenzel – former NFL player
- Kalin Lucas – former NBA player
- Greg Pateryn – NHL defenseman
- Frank Zombo – NFL linebacker for Kansas City Chiefs
