= Fitzgerald High School =

Fitzgerald High School may refer to:

- Fitzgerald High School (Georgia) - Fitzgerald, Georgia
- Fitzgerald High School (Michigan) - Warren, Michigan, in Metro Detroit
