= Van Dyke, Michigan =

Community in Macomb County, Michigan

Van Dyke was a community along the northern boundary of Detroit, Michigan, near Van Dyke Avenue and 9 Mile Road. The town was named for Van Dyke Avenue, which was named for James Van Dyke, Mayor of Detroit in 1847. This was in the southern end of what was then Warren Township, Macomb County, Michigan. The Van Dyke Post Office operated from 1925 until 1957.

The town of Van Dyke was platted by Walter Piper in 1917 and its streets named for autos being manufactured at the time. Street names (still in existence) include Packard, Hudson, Marmon, Ford, Dodge, Paige, Republic, Federal, Hupp, Maxwell, Cadillac, Studebaker, Chalmers and Automobile. The two main auto engine manufacturers of the time—Continental and Lozier—also got street names. It was annexed into Warren, Michigan when the township was made into a city in 1957. Its identity is still preserved by Van Dyke Public Schools.

== Sources ==
1.Encyclopædia Britannica Atlas, 1959 Edition, p. 405.
2.Romig, Walter (1986). Michigan Place Names Detroit, MI: Wayne University Press.
3.Naldrett, Alan (2015). Lost Towns of Eastern Michigan Charleston, SC: The History Press.
