= Zachariah Chandler =

American businessman and politician (1813–1879)

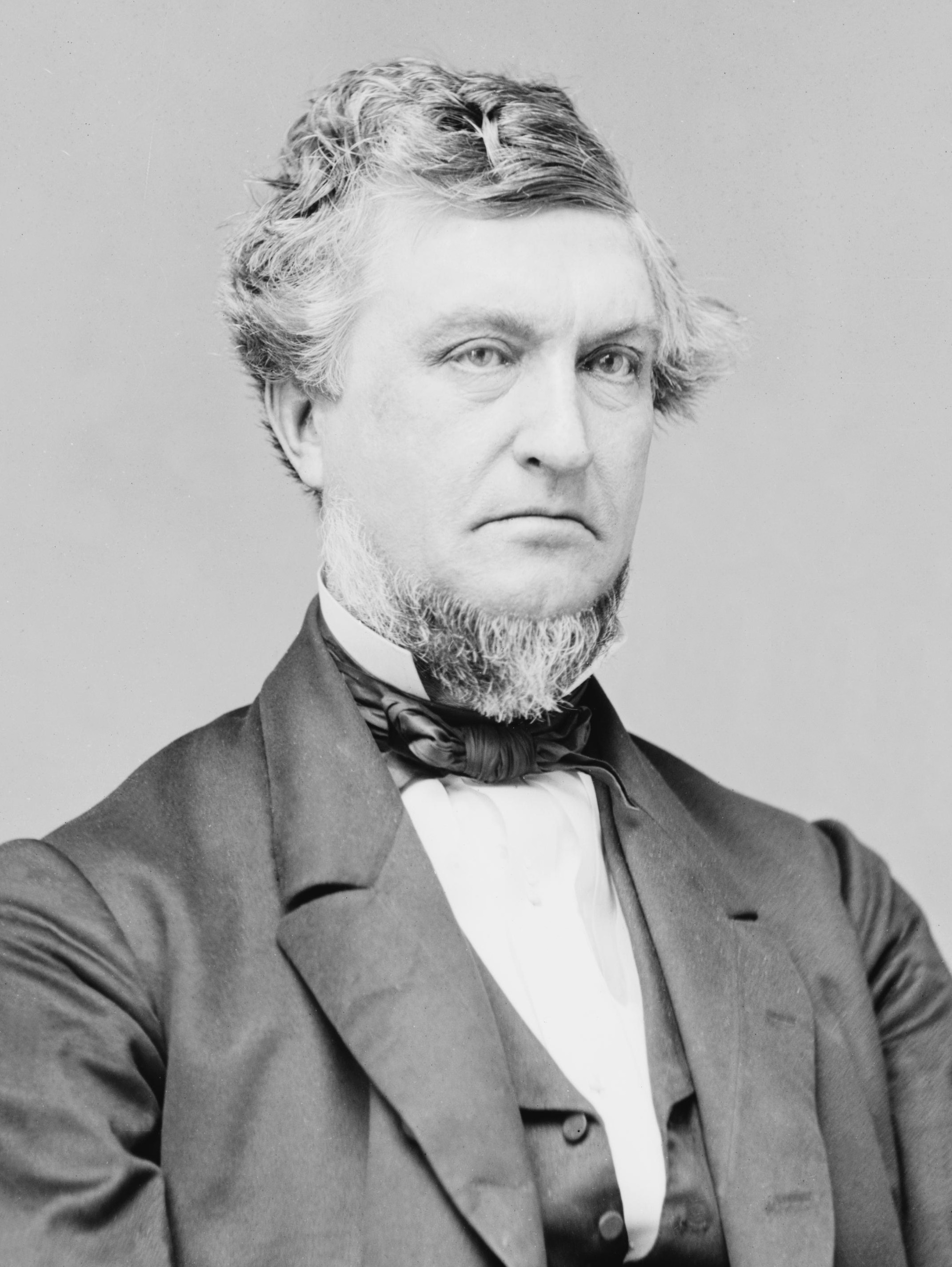
- Chandler, 1855–1865

United States Senator from Michigan
- In office February 22, 1879 – November 1, 1879
- Preceded by: Isaac P. Christiancy
- Succeeded by: Henry P. Baldwin
- In office March 4, 1857 – March 3, 1875
- Preceded by: Lewis Cass
- Succeeded by: Isaac P. Christiancy

Chair of the Republican National Committee
- In office June 1876 – November 1, 1879
- Preceded by: Edwin D. Morgan
- Succeeded by: J. Donald Cameron

12th United States Secretary of the Interior
- In office October 19, 1875 – March 11, 1877
- President: Ulysses S. Grant; Rutherford B. Hayes
- Preceded by: Columbus Delano
- Succeeded by: Carl Schurz

Mayor of Detroit
- In office 1851–1852
- Preceded by: John Ladue
- Succeeded by: John H. Harmon

Personal details
- Born: December 10, 1813 Bedford, New Hampshire, U.S.
- Died: November 1, 1879 (aged 65) Chicago, Illinois, U.S.
- Party: Whig (before 1854); Republican (1854–1879)
- Spouse: Letitia Douglas

Zachariah Chandler (December 10, 1813 – November 1, 1879) was an American businessman, politician, and one of the founders of the Republican Party, whose radical wing he dominated as a lifelong abolitionist. He was mayor of Detroit, a four-term senator from the state of Michigan, and Secretary of the Interior under President Ulysses S. Grant.

As a successful young businessman in Detroit, Chandler supported the Underground Railroad. During the Civil War, he advocated for the Union war effort, the abolition of slavery, and civil rights for freed African Americans. As Secretary of the Interior, Chandler eradicated serious corruption in the Bureau of Indian Affairs, fully endorsing President Grant's Peace Policy initiative to civilize American Indian tribes. In 1879, he was re-elected U.S. Senator and was a potential presidential candidate, but he died the following morning after giving a speech in Chicago.

Chandler’s great great grandnephew is Rod Chandler, who was a U.S. representative from Washington state from 1983 to 1993.

== Early life and career ==
Zachariah Chandler was born in Bedford, New Hampshire, on December 10, 1813. His father was Samuel Chandler and his mother was Margaret Orr. Through an entirely paternal line, Samuel Chandler was a descendant of William Chandler who had migrated to Roxbury, Massachusetts, from England in 1637. Through this line he was the seventh generation of his family born in North America. Margaret Orr was the oldest daughter of military officer Col. John Orr. Chandler was educated in the common schools. Upon graduation, deciding not to attend college, Chandler moved west in 1833 to Detroit, at that time the capital of Michigan Territory. In Detroit, Chandler opened a general store and through trade, banking, and land speculation became one of the wealthiest men in the state of Michigan.

== Marriage and family ==
On December 10, 1844, Chandler married Letitia Grace Douglas, a native of Baltimore, who moved to New York. A social entertainer, Letitia lived in Washington during the Winter throughout Chandler's career. Chandler and Letitia had one daughter, Mary Douglas Chandler, who married Senator Eugene Hale of Maine. Chandler's and Letitia's grandchildren included Frederick Hale, who was a long-serving U.S. Senator from Maine, and Chandler Hale, who served as a U.S. diplomat in Rome. Letitia, known to have a "gentle and kindly disposition" and to be "much beloved," died on February 19, 1899.

== Political career ==
From his youth, Chandler had been strongly opposed to slavery and hoped that the Northern Whig party would be able to stop Southern slave power from spreading slavery into the Western Territories. Chandler financially supported the Detroit Underground Railroad, which helped fugitive or runaway slaves find safe haven.

In 1848 Chandler began his political career by making campaign speeches for the Whig Party presidential candidate Zachary Taylor. In 1851, Chandler was elected Mayor of Detroit and served one year in office. In 1852, Chandler ran as a Whig candidate for the Governor of Michigan, but he was defeated. Having supported Kansas as a free state without slavery, Chandler signed a petition that formed the Republican Party on July 6, 1854. In 1856, Chandler was a delegate at the first Republican Party National convention in Pittsburgh, Pennsylvania, and was a member of the Republican National Committee. The Republican Convention that year nominated John C. Frémont for president, known as The Pathfinder, who wanted to rid Kansas of African American slavery and opposed the repeal of the Missouri Compromise.

== U.S. Senator (1857–1875) ==
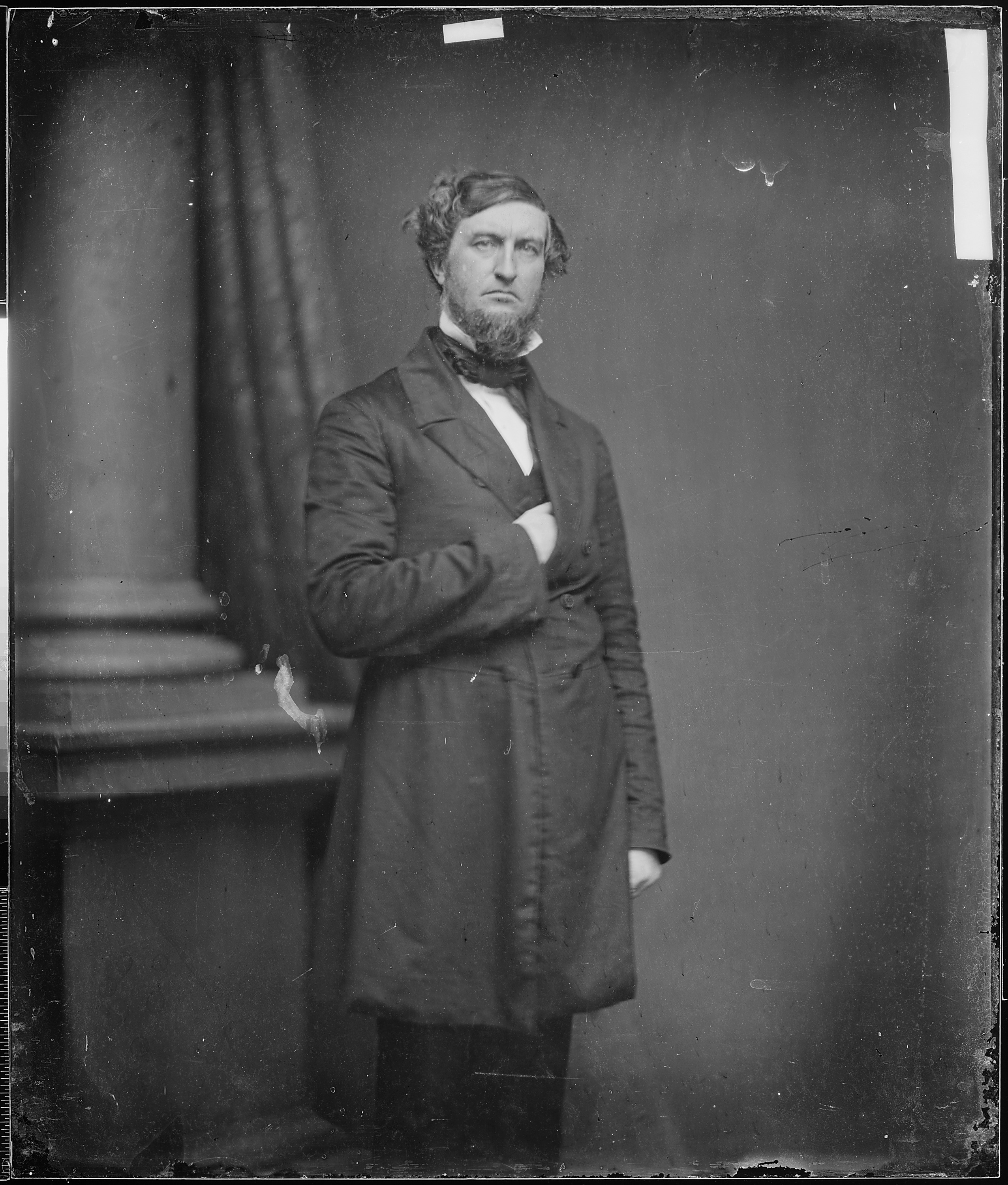
Portrait by Mathew Brady, c. 1860–1865

In January 1857, Chandler ran as a Republican and was elected as a U.S. Senator for Michigan, succeeding Lewis Cass. Chandler was reelected in 1863 and again in 1869, serving from March 4, 1857, to March 3, 1875, in the 35th through the 43rd U.S. Congresses. In the Senate Chandler allied himself with the anti-slavery Radicals, although he opposed Massachusetts Senator Charles Sumner. Chandler was the most outspoken Senator against secession. From March 1861 to 1875 Chandler was chairman of the Committee on Commerce that controlled powerful "pork barrel" appropriations for rivers and harbors. At the outbreak of the Civil War Chandler used his Senatorial influence to raise and equip the Michigan volunteers. Chandler was a member of the Joint Committee on the Conduct of the War.

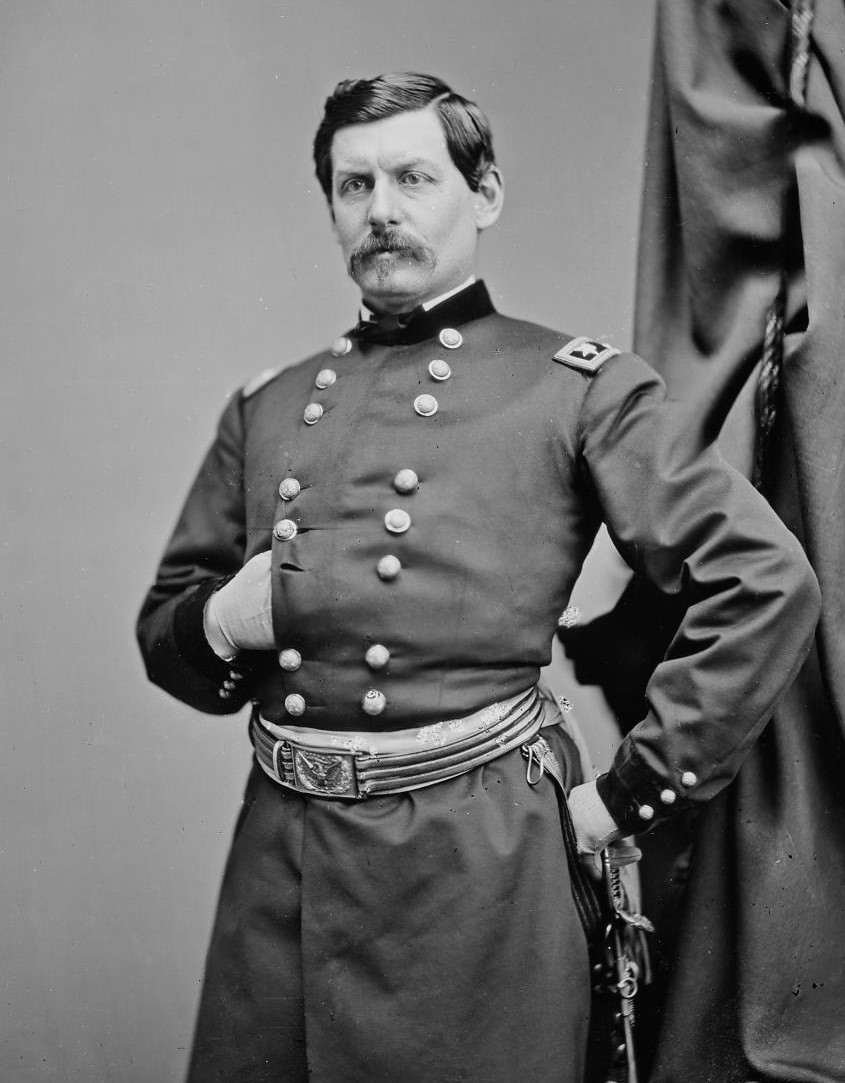
Chandler castigated General George McClellan's prosecution of the Civil War.

On July 6, 1862, Chandler castigated General George McClellan's prosecution of the war in a speech at Jackson, Michigan. Chandler regarded his speech against McClellan as one of his most important public services. Chandler's attack on McClellan came five days after McClellan failed to capture Richmond and the withdrawal of Union troops by McClellan to the James River during the Seven Days Battle that resulted in Confederate victory. On March 3, 1863, Chandler authored legislation for the collection and administration of abandoned property in the South. On July 2, 1864, Chandler authored legislation for the regulation of intercourse with the insurrectionist Confederate states.

Chandler supported higher tariff rates, the creation of a national bank, and voted for greenbacks as an emergency war measure, but strongly condemned any inflation of the currency. Chandler supported Reconstruction Acts that gave civil rights to African Americans but criticized reconstruction for being too lax. On January 5, 1866, Chandler authored a resolution for non-intercourse with Great Britain for refusing to negotiate the Alabama Claims, but this was rejected by the Senate. During the Civil War, Great Britain secretly allowed Confederate warships to be armed in British ports. These ships, including the CSS Alabama, did much to destroy Union commerce causing great monetary damage to the Union war effort. On November 29, 1867, in retaliation to Britain, Chandler submitted a resolution that Abyssinia be recognized as a belligerent nation at war against Great Britain, demanding that Abyssinia be given the "same rights which the British had recognized to the Confederacy" during the Civil War. During the election of 1868, Chandler was chairman of the Republican Congressional Committee.

Chandler was known as one of the Radical Republicans who pushed for harsher punishment for the former rebels, and greater liberties for African-Americans. After the war, he angrily stated that "Every man who murdered and stole and poisoned was a Democrat".

During his entire Senate career, Chandler used his Senatorial federal patronage to increase his own political power. Chandler's methods of obtaining power were considered "openly partisan and despotic if not actually corrupt" in obtaining control of the Republican machine in Michigan. Chandler was for many years Michigan's undisputed Republican boss. The Democratic landslide during the election of 1874 broke his Senatorial power and he was defeated by Isaac P. Christiancy while seeking election for a fourth term when the Michigan legislature deadlocked.

== Secretary of the Interior (1875–1877) ==
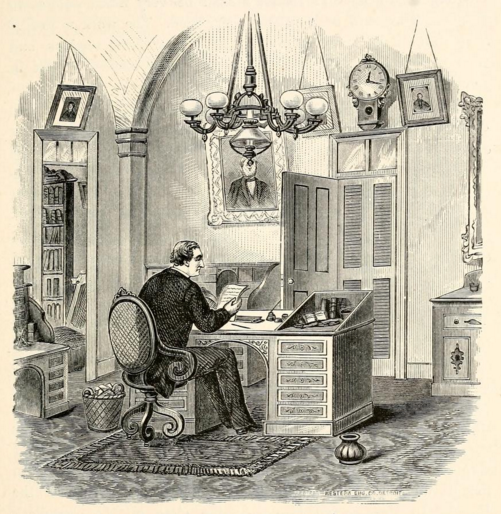
Chandler in his office at the Department of Interior

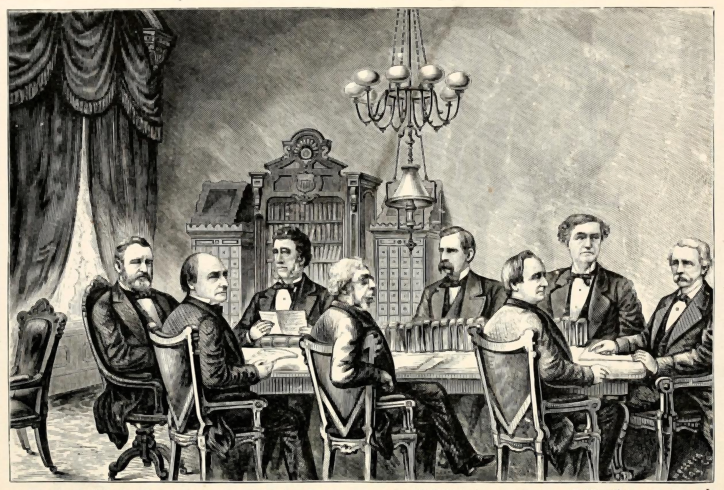
Chandler in President Ulysses S. Grant's Cabinet

Chandler was appointed Secretary of the Interior by President Ulysses S. Grant in October 1875 and served until 1877. In compliance with President Grant's recommendations and authority, he implemented reforms in and reorganized the Department of the Interior during his tenure in office. The previous Secretary of the Interior, Columbus Delano, was not a reformer and had carelessly allowed profiteering to spread throughout the Interior Department. Secretary Chandler fired corrupt agents at the Bureau of Indian Affairs and fired and replaced the Indian Commissioner and Bureau Clerk. In addition, Secretary Chandler banned "Indian Attorneys" from the Interior Department, who swindled Indian tribes into paying for bogus representation in Washington D.C. Secretary Chandler fully endorsed President Grant's Peace Policy initiative to civilize American Indian tribes. To assist in fighting corruption Chandler convinced President Grant to appoint reformers Charles T. Gorham of Michigan to Assistant Secretary of Interior and Augustus S. Gaylord Assistant Attorney-Generalship of the Department of Interior. These men were instrumental helping Chandler remove internal corruption from the Department of Interior. In February 1876 Chandler handed Indians who refused to leave their hunting grounds, concerning the encroachment in the Black Hills by miners, over to Secretary of War William W. Belknap's department.

=== Reformed Bureau of Indian Affairs ===
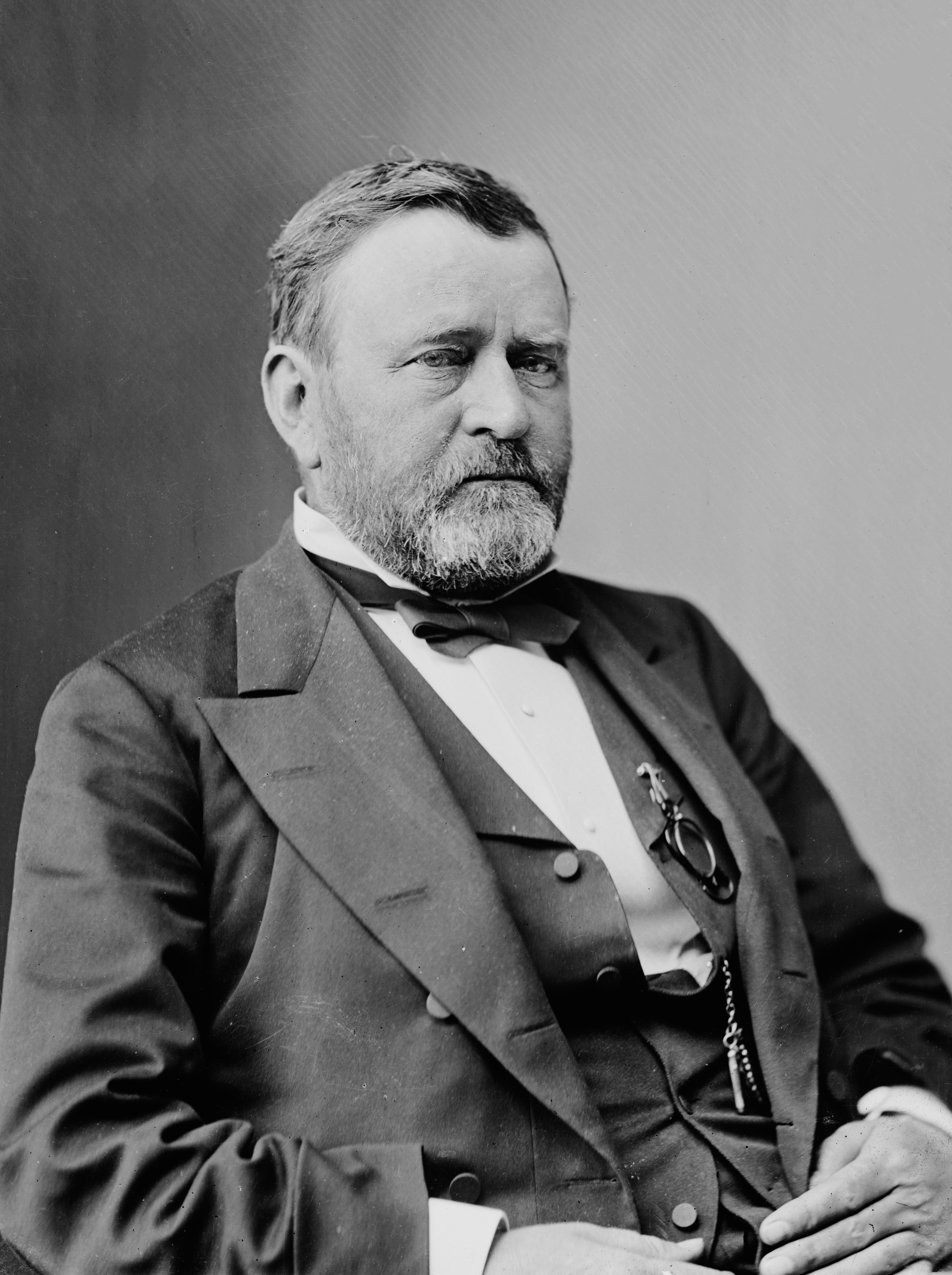
President Grant ordered Chandler to fire all the corrupt clerks in the Bureau of Indian Affairs.

When Chandler took office he found the Bureau of Indian Affairs to be the most corrupt out of the federal departments under his charge. Chandler replaced the Bureau's Commissioner and the Chief Clerk. Chandler quietly investigated the Bureau and found corrupt appointees and suspicious practices by subordinates. Chandler ordered their removal, but the new commissioner said that these men were valuable to the Bureau, so Chandler held off firing the clerks. President Grant was following Chandler's activities and asked why the corrupt clerks at the Bureau had not been fired. Chandler replied to Grant that the Commissioner said it would be impossible to run the Bureau without them. Grant, then ordered Chandler to fire the corrupt clerks even if that meant shutting down the Bureau. Chandler immediately went over to the Bureau and gave orders for the suspected clerks to be fired which was promptly enforced. This was the only time Grant was directly active in reforming a federal department. Grant continued to support Chandler in his reform efforts.

=== Reformed Pension Bureau and Land Office ===
In addition to the Bureau of Indian Affairs, Chandler also thoroughly investigated the Pension Bureau. The investigation resulted in removing of fraudulent claims that saved the federal government hundreds of thousands of dollars. Within one month of his administration Chandler fired all Pension Bureau clerks involved in corruption. Chandler had Gaylord and Gorham to investigate the United States General Land Office whose investigation discovered there was a "Chippewa half-breed scrip" profiteering combination. Chandler broke up the combination and fired all of the members connected to the corrupt ring.

=== Reformed Patent Office ===
During his first month in office, Chandler fired all the clerks in one room of the Patent Office declaring every desk vacant believing all the clerks were involved in either corruption or lacked the integrity for reform. Chandler vacated the room and put in charge an African American porter to lock by key and keep people from entering the room until honest replacements were found. Chandler paid no attention to complaints and warned a man who believed he was fired unjustly not to complain to the press. Chandler without warning instigated an investigation by putting a new officer in charge of monthly payrolls of Patent Office employees taking the full names and addresses of everyone who signed them. Almost twenty employees were found to be fictitious created by a profiteering ring to defraud federal payroll monies. Chandler also exposed and removed corrupt unqualified clerks who profiteered by hiring out their work to underpaid replacements. Chandler simplified Patent Office rules making patents easier to obtain and lessening their costs to the public.

=== Banned Indian Attorneys ===
In December 1875 Chandler banned "Indian Attorneys", persons who claimed to represent Indians in Washington, from the Department of Interior. Bogus "agents" induced Indian tribes to pay them $8.00 a day plus expenses in exchange for fraudulent legislative representation in Washington during the Winter months. Other agents would contract Indian land acquisition arrangements as security for payments. Preying on the fears of Indians, these "attorneys" would tell the Indians their tribal rights would be taken away in Washington if they did not accept their services. Chandler banned payment to these men for alleged services to Indians saying their claims or representation were illegal and immoral. Chandler declared, "...the regularly-appointed Indian Agent, the Commission of Indian Affairs, and the Secretary of Interior are competent to protect and defend the rights of Indians in all respects...." Chandler's banning of "Indian Attorneys" saved the Indian tribes large amounts of money.

== Chairman of the Republican Party ==
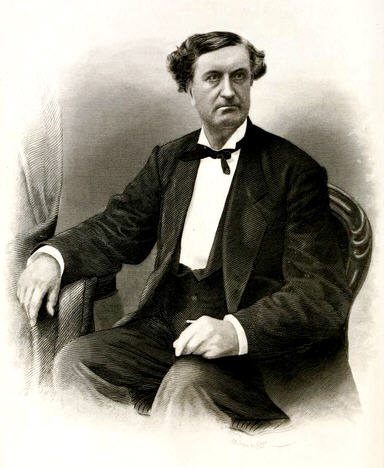
Chandler in a depiction by The Detroit Post and Tribune, 1880

Chandler, as Chairman of the Republican National Committee, managed Rutherford B. Hayes' successful 1876 campaign for the presidency, though Hayes declined to keep Chandler as Secretary of the Interior. He became Chairman of the Michigan Republican Party in 1878.

== U.S. Senator (1879) ==
In 1879, he was again elected to the Senate to fill the vacancy caused by the resignation of Isaac P. Christiancy, who had succeeded him just four years earlier. He served in the 45th and 46th Congresses from February 22, 1879, until his death later that year.

=== Last speech and death ===
Under consideration by party leaders as a possible candidate in the 1880 presidential election, Chandler went to Chicago to deliver a political speech on October 31, 1879. Maintaining his Radical roots, Chandler spoke in front of an African American Young Men's Republican Auxiliary Club at McCormick Hall. Chandler said that he hoped one day blacks would be able to vote freely and safely, run for office, and make speeches throughout the nation including the South just as former rebels were allowed to vote, run for office, and speak in the North. Although he had earlier contracted a cold he was known to be his robust self that day. The next day he was found dead in one of his rooms at the Grand Pacific Hotel at 7:00 in the morning reclining on his bed. He is interred at Elmwood Cemetery in Detroit.

== Legacy ==
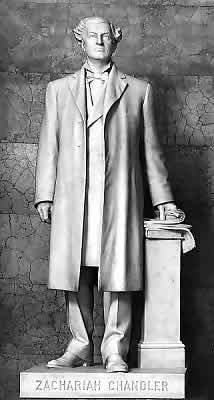
Chandler at the National Statuary Hall. His statue has returned to Michigan since the state Legislature voted in 2007 to replace it with a statue of Gerald Ford. His statue now rests in the atrium of Constitution Hall in Lansing, Michigan.

When Chandler was appointed Secretary of Interior by President Grant in 1875, reformers were concerned that corruption and patronage in the department would continue as under Secretary Columbus Delano, Grant's previous appointment. Chandler had a reputation as a wealthy Republican partisan political boss, rather than a reformer. However, these concerns proved unwarranted, as Chandler proved to be an efficient reformer. Chandler investigated corruption in his department and reported to President Grant, who gave him approval to launch reforms. He fired many in the department who were involved in corruption and fraud, and removed from the department persons known as "Indian Attorneys."

== See also ==
- List of members of the United States Congress who died in office (1790–1899)

== Sources ==
- The Detroit Post and Tribune (1880). Zachariah Chandler An Outline Sketch of His Life and Public Services. Detroit: The Post and Tribune Company Publishers.
- MacDonald, William (1929). Allen Johnson (ed.). Dictionary of American Biography Chandler, Zachariah. New York: Charles Scribner's Sons.
- "Mrs. Zachariah Chandler Dead" (PDF). New York Times. New York. February 20, 1899.

Political offices
Preceded by John Ladue	Mayor of Detroit; 1851–1852	Succeeded by John H. Harmon
Preceded by Columbus Delano	United States Secretary of the Interior; 1875–1877	Succeeded by Carl Schurz
Party political offices
Preceded by Townsend E. Gidley	Whig nominee for Governor of Michigan; 1852	Party dissolved
Preceded by Edwin D. Morgan	Chair of the Republican National Committee; 1876–1879	Succeeded by J. Donald Cameron
Preceded by George H. Hopkins	Chair of the Michigan Republican Party; 1878–1879	Succeeded by James McMillan
U.S. Senate
Preceded by Lewis Cass	U.S. Senator (Class 1) from Michigan; 1857–1875; Served alongside: Charles E. Stuart, Kinsley S. Bingham, Jacob M. Howard, Thomas W. Ferry	Succeeded by Isaac P. Christiancy
Preceded by Clement Claiborne Clay	Chair of the Senate Commerce Committee; 1861–1875	Succeeded by Roscoe Conkling
Preceded by Isaac P. Christiancy	U.S. Senator (Class 1) from Michigan; 1879; Served alongside: Thomas W. Ferry	Succeeded by Henry P. Baldwin
