= John Wojciechowski =

American football player (born 1963)

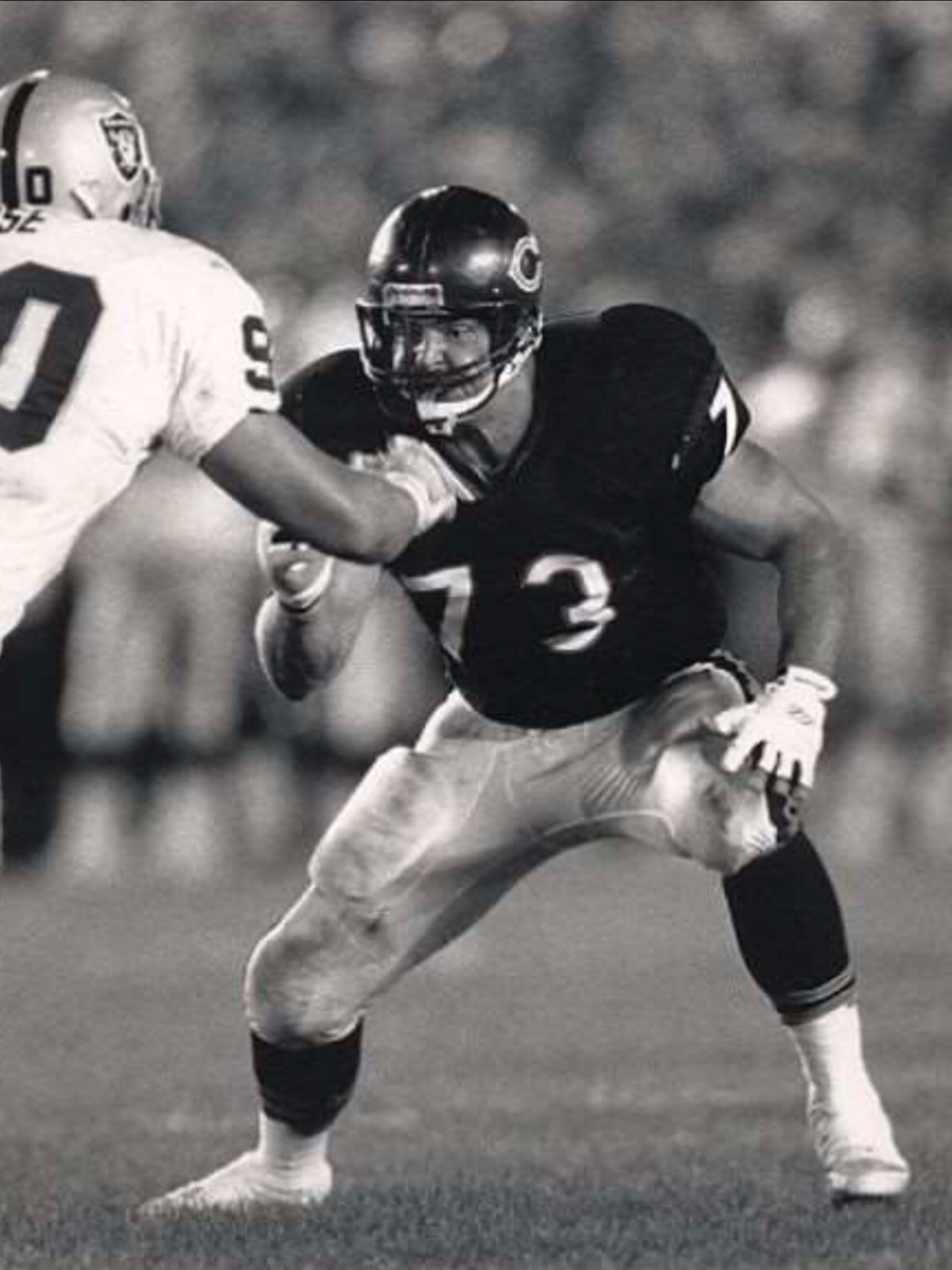
- Wojciechowski with the Chicago Bears in 1990

No. 73
- Positions: Tackle, guard

Personal information
- Born: July 30, 1963 (age 63); Detroit, Michigan, U.S.
- Listed height: 6 ft 4 in (1.93 m)
- Listed weight: 272 lb (123 kg)

Career information
- High school: Fitzgerald (Warren, Michigan)
- College: Michigan State
- NFL draft: 1986: undrafted

Career history
- Buffalo Bills (1986)*; Chicago Bears (1987–1993)
- * Offseason or practice squad member only

Awards and highlights
- First-team All-Big Ten (1985)

Career NFL statistics
- Games played: 92
- Games started: 39
- Fumble recoveries: 5
- Stats at Pro Football Reference

John Stanley Wojciechowski (born July 30, 1963) is an American former professional football player who was an offensive tackle for seven seasons with the Chicago Bears of the National Football League (NFL). According to a statistic on the back of a 1994 Topps John Wojciechowski football card, Wojciechowski started a total of 41 games. According to an article in the Windy City Gridiron, he started only 39 games. He played college football for the Michigan State Spartans.

As stated in the List of Chicago Bears seasons, the Bears made it to the playoffs four of the seven seasons that Wojciechowski was a part of the team. In an article written and published by the Windy City Gridiron, Wojciechowski was recognized as being one of the top undrafted free agents. He wasn't in their top-10 list, but was given and honorable mention at the end of the article.

Wojciechowski's first year playing with the Bears (1987) was legendary Walter Payton's last year. (Payton's outstanding rushing and receiving season, just two years prior to Wojciechowski joining the team, was one of the reasons the Bears were fortunate enough to compete in and win Super Bowl XX.)

== Early life ==
The second youngest of Jean and Michael Wojciechowski's six children, John Wojciechowski was born in Detroit, Michigan on July 30, 1963. Wojciechowski's ancestors originated in Poland. (On Casimir Pulaski Day 2012, a local holiday officially observed in Illinois, the Windy City Gridiron published an article about Chicago Bears who were Polish. Wojciechowski was mentioned in that article.)

Wojciechowski attended Fitzgerald High School in Warren, Michigan. He was an outstanding athlete in all three of the sports that he participated in (football, wrestling, track and field).

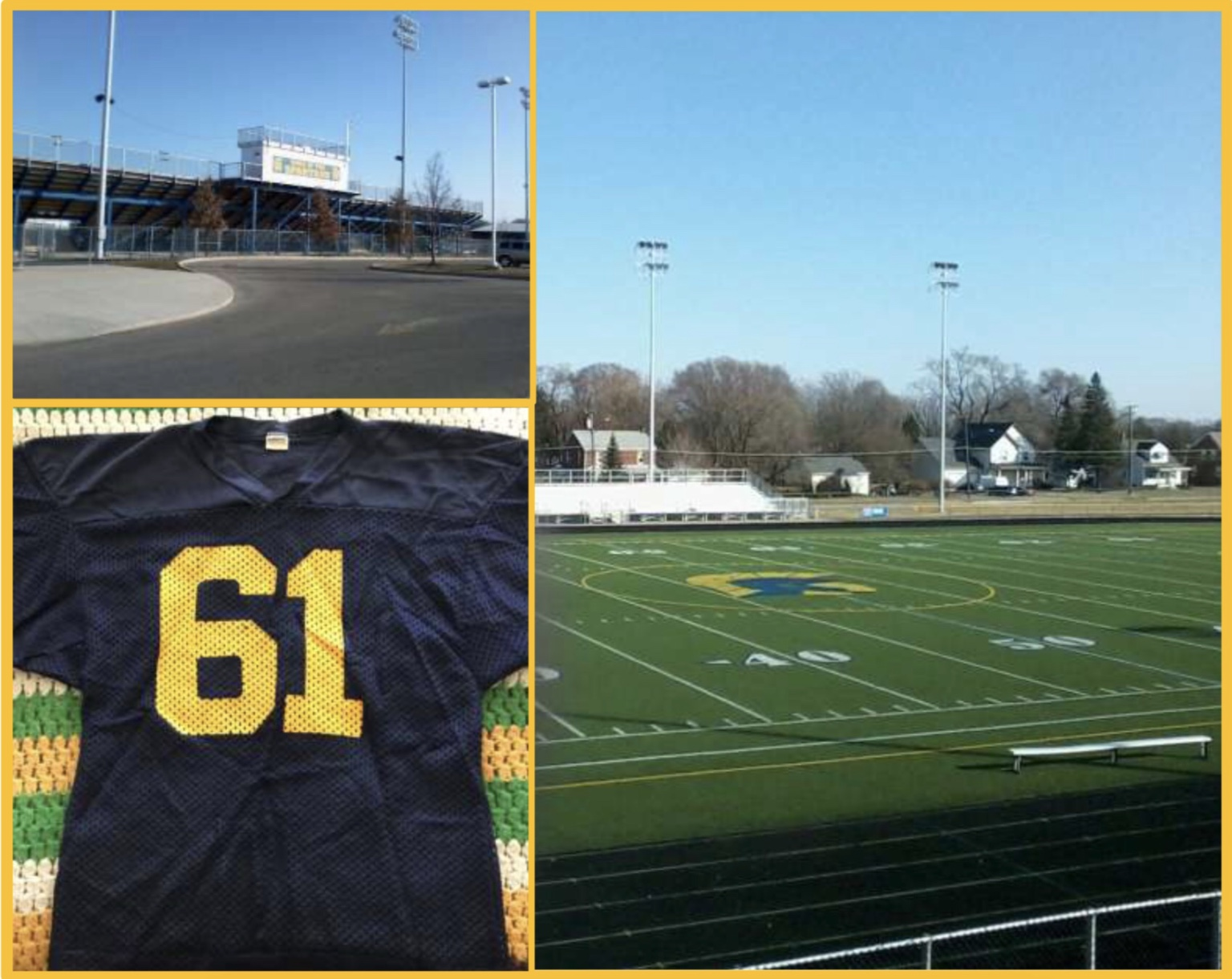
The field where Wojciechowski played high school football and the style of jersey that he wore for home games

In his junior and senior years (1979–80), playing both offense and defense on the Fitzgerald Spartans football team, Wojciechowski's performance was a major factor in the team's success. There were many talented football players on the conference champions '79 and '80 teams, some of whom went on to play college football. Like Wojciechowski, quarterback John Lonchar was also an exceptional athlete. He, too, was favorably mentioned in the Detroit News, Detroit Free Press and other local newspapers. Lonchar was Macomb County's Player of the Year in 1980.

In 1979, under the leadership of Michigan High School Hall of Fame coach Al Drath (inducted in 1983), the Spartans advanced all the way to the State of Michigan Semi-Finals, but lost the game to the Lumen Christi Titans (an all-boys Catholic school in Jackson, Michigan). In an article written and published by MLive Media Group, many people believe that the 1979 Lumen Christi team was the absolute best team that the high school football fans of Jackson, Michigan have ever seen. It was stated in that article that Lumen Christi's "biggest game of the season" was against the Warren Fitzgerald Spartans. All the local newspapers in the Detroit area thought the Spartans were going to upset the top-ranked Titans. The Titans advanced to the Finals' game the following week, which was held at the Pontiac Silverdome, and defeated the Grand Rapids West Catholic Falcons. (Michigan High School Hall of Fame Football Coach Ron Glodich, who played football for Coach Drath during the 1980–81 seasons, favorably mentioned Coach Drath during his acceptance speech at his induction ceremony.)

During his senior year, Wojciechowski was the State of Michigan Class B Heavyweight Wrestling Champion. He was the runner-up the year before. Michigan High School Hall of Fame coach Steve Zervas (inducted in 1997) was Wojciechowski's wrestling coach. Wojciechowski was also an outstanding shot putter. He set a school record that still holds to this day.

== Career ==
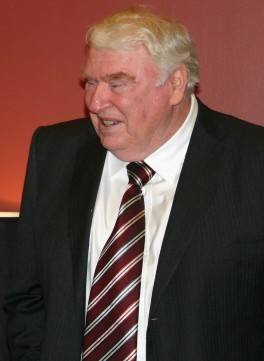
John Madden 2007

After graduating from Fitzgerald High School in 1981, Wojciechowski attended and played football for Michigan State University. He graduated in 1985 with a Bachelor of Arts Degree in physical education.

Wojciechowski signed with the Chicago Bears in 1987. He was an offensive lineman most of the time, but did play on defense occasionally. During his career, he recovered five fumbles, three of which were recovered while playing offensively and the other two while playing defensively.

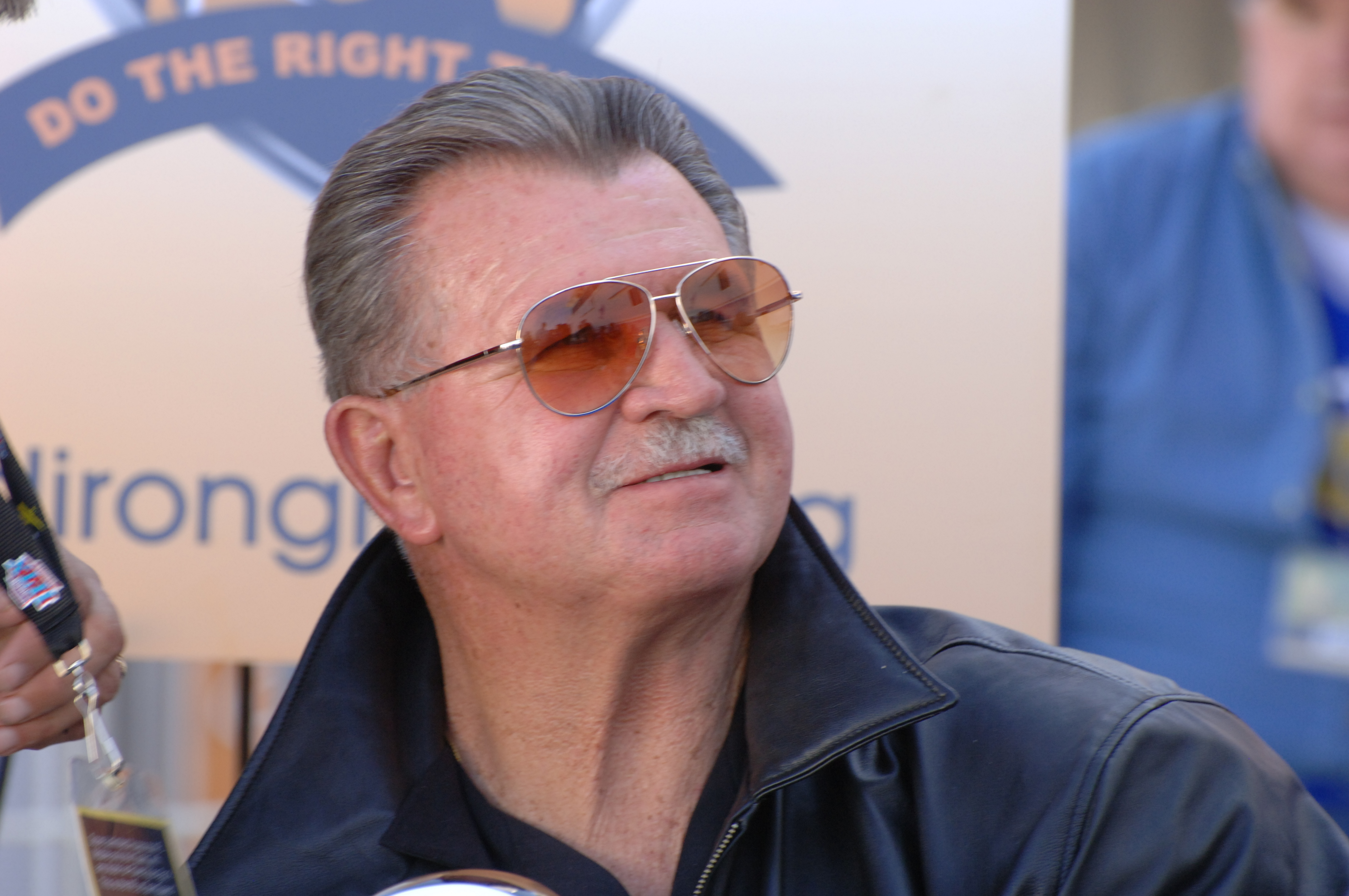
Mike Ditka 2008. He was Wojciechowski's coach.

During a televised CBS Sports Bears' game against the Los Angeles Raiders in his rookie year on December 27, 1987, the late, legendary sports broadcasters John Madden and Pat Summerall made some whimsical remarks regarding the length of Wojciechowski's name. At the time, they mentioned that it was the longest name in the NFL and barely fit on the back of his jersey.

Madden and Summerall also made some remarks regarding his playing ability just moments later. Immediately following a pass completion by the Bears' quarterback Mike Tomczak, Madden stated that Wojciechowski did "a pretty good job of pass protection." Madden also went on to state that Wojciechowski "is a hard worker, stays with his guy." Summerall followed that comment with one of his own. He stated that Bears' coach Mike Ditka told him that he "liked his footwork... his quickness, he's an athlete."
