= Frederick Buhl =

American politician

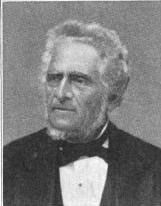

Mayor of Detroit
- In office 1848–1848
- Preceded by: James A. Van Dyke
- Succeeded by: Charles Howard

Personal details
- Born: November 27, 1806 Butler County, Pennsylvania
- Died: May 12, 1890 (aged 83) Detroit, Michigan
- Spouse: Matilda Beatty

Frederick Buhl (November 27, 1806 – May 12, 1890) was a businessman from Detroit, Michigan. He served as the city's mayor in 1848.

== Biography ==
Frederick Buhl was born in Zelienople, Pennsylvania on November 27, 1806, the second of eleven children. He went to Pittsburgh at the age of 16 to learn to be a jeweler, but ill-health forced him to change plans, and in 1833 he moved to Detroit. There, he formed a partnership with his brother Christian H. Buhl, a trained hatter. The brothers began selling hats, but soon branched out into furs, establishing a large and successful company under the name of the F & C H Buhl Co. They remained in business together for 20 years, after which Christian retired from the trade and Frederick Buhl continued in business independently under the name F. Buhl and Company. In 1887, Buhl sold the company to his son Walter; the business was eventually sold to Edwin S. George in 1898.

In addition to his furrier business, Frederick Buhl was the director of two banks, the president of Harper Hospital, president of the Fort Wayne and Elmwood Street Railway, and one of the original directors of the Merchant's Exchange and Board of Trade.

Buhl was a Republican, and served on the city council, and was mayor of Detroit in 1848.

In 1836 he married Matilda Beatty; the couple had six children. Frederick Buhl died May 12, 1890.

Political offices
Preceded by James A. Van Dyke	Mayor of Detroit; 1848	Succeeded by Charles Howard
