= Charles Howard (mayor) =

American politician (1804–1883)

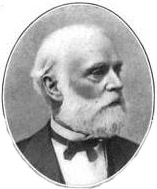

Mayor of Detroit
- In office 1849–1849
- Preceded by: Frederick Buhl
- Succeeded by: John Ladue

Personal details
- Born: August 7, 1804 Chenango County, New York
- Died: November 6, 1883 (aged 79) New York
- Spouse: Margaret Vosburg

Charles Howard (August 7, 1804 – November 6, 1883) was mayor of Detroit in 1849.

== Biography ==
Charles Howard was born August 7, 1804, in Chenango County, New York. His family moved to Port Jervis, New York; when Charles Howard was an adult he moved to Sackets Harbor, New York and worked as a schooner captain. He later joined the firm of Alvin Bronson and Company (later Bronson, Crocker, and Company) as a shipping and forwarding commission merchant, and moved to Oswego, New York, to represent to firm.

In 1834 he married Margaret Vosburg. The couple had two children: Mrs. William J. Waterman and well-known dramatist Bronson Howard.

In 1840, Howard came to Detroit, now a partner in the shipping firm of Bronson, Crocker, and Howard, to establish an agency for the firm. In 1848, he entered a partnership with N. P. Stewart, continuing his shipping and forwarding business and also as a railroad contractor, building substantial portions of the Detroit and Milwaukee Railroad line, although his firm lost $280,000 in the project. In 1854, Howard dissolved his partnership with Stewart and formed another one with his brother, Sebre.

Howard was simultaneously president of the Farmer's and Mechanics Bank and the Peninsular Bank, and in 1848 he was elected mayor of Detroit.

The Panic of 1857 caused the failure of the Peninsular Bank, and in 1858, Charles Howard moved to New York City. There, Charles and Sebre Howard opened the business "Howard Brothers, Firearms," which was in business from 1863 to 1874. Charles Howard died November 6, 1883, at the house of his son-in-law.

Political offices
Preceded by Frederick Buhl	Mayor of Detroit; 1849	Succeeded by John Ladue
