= James A. Van Dyke =

American politician

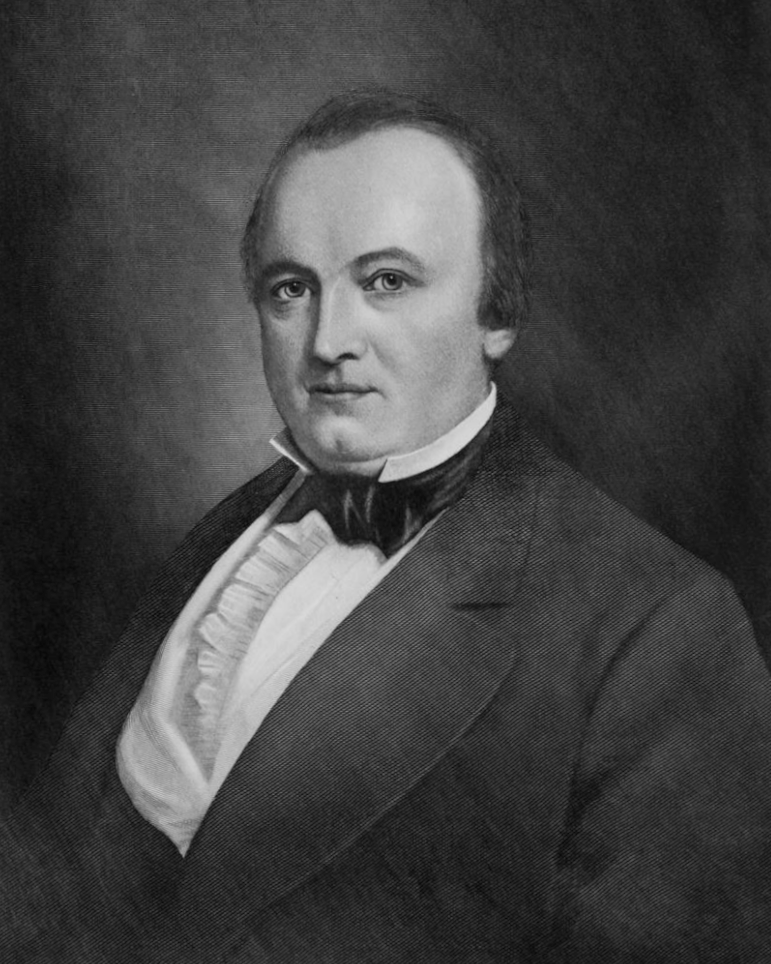

Mayor of Detroit
- In office 1847–1847
- Preceded by: John R. Williams
- Succeeded by: Frederick Buhl

Personal details
- Born: December 1813 Mercersburg, Pennsylvania
- Died: May 7, 1855 (aged 41) Detroit, Michigan
- Party: Whig
- Spouse: Elizabeth Desnoyers
- Education: Madison College

James Adams Van Dyke (December 1813 – May 7, 1855) was a lawyer, fireman and the 21st mayor of Detroit, Michigan. He was elected in 1847.

== Early biography ==
James Adams Van Dyke was born in Mercersburg, Pennsylvania in December, 1813, the son of William and Nancy Duncan Van Dyke. He graduated from Madison College in Uniontown, Pennsylvania in 1832, then studied law in Chambersburg, Pennsylvania and Hagerstown, Maryland before moving to Baltimore. In 1834, he moved to Pittsburgh, Pennsylvania, but was unhappy with his situation there and moved on to Detroit, where six months later was admitted to the bar. He began a practice with future Michigan Supreme Court justice Charles W. Whipple in 1835, later partnering with, in turn, E. B. Harrington and H. H. Emmons, before leaving private practice in 1852 to become the attorney for the Michigan Central Railroad.

In 1837, he married Elizabeth Desnoyers; the couple had eleven children.

== Public service ==
In 1835, Van Dyke was appointed City Attorney for Detroit; he also served in that capacity in 1839, and as Wayne County prosecuting attorney in 1840. He was a city alderman in 1843 and 1844, and was elected mayor in 1847. He was president of the Detroit Fire Department from 1847-1851, and a member of the Board of Commissioners of the Detroit Water Works from 1853 until his death in 1855.

Politically, Van Dyke was a Whig, and he was described as a brilliant and eloquent orator.

James A. Van Dyke died on May 7, 1855.

== See also ==
- Van Dyke, Michigan

Political offices
Preceded by John R. Williams	Mayor of Detroit; 1847	Succeeded by Frederick Buhl
