= Warren, Michigan =

City in Michigan, United States

- City
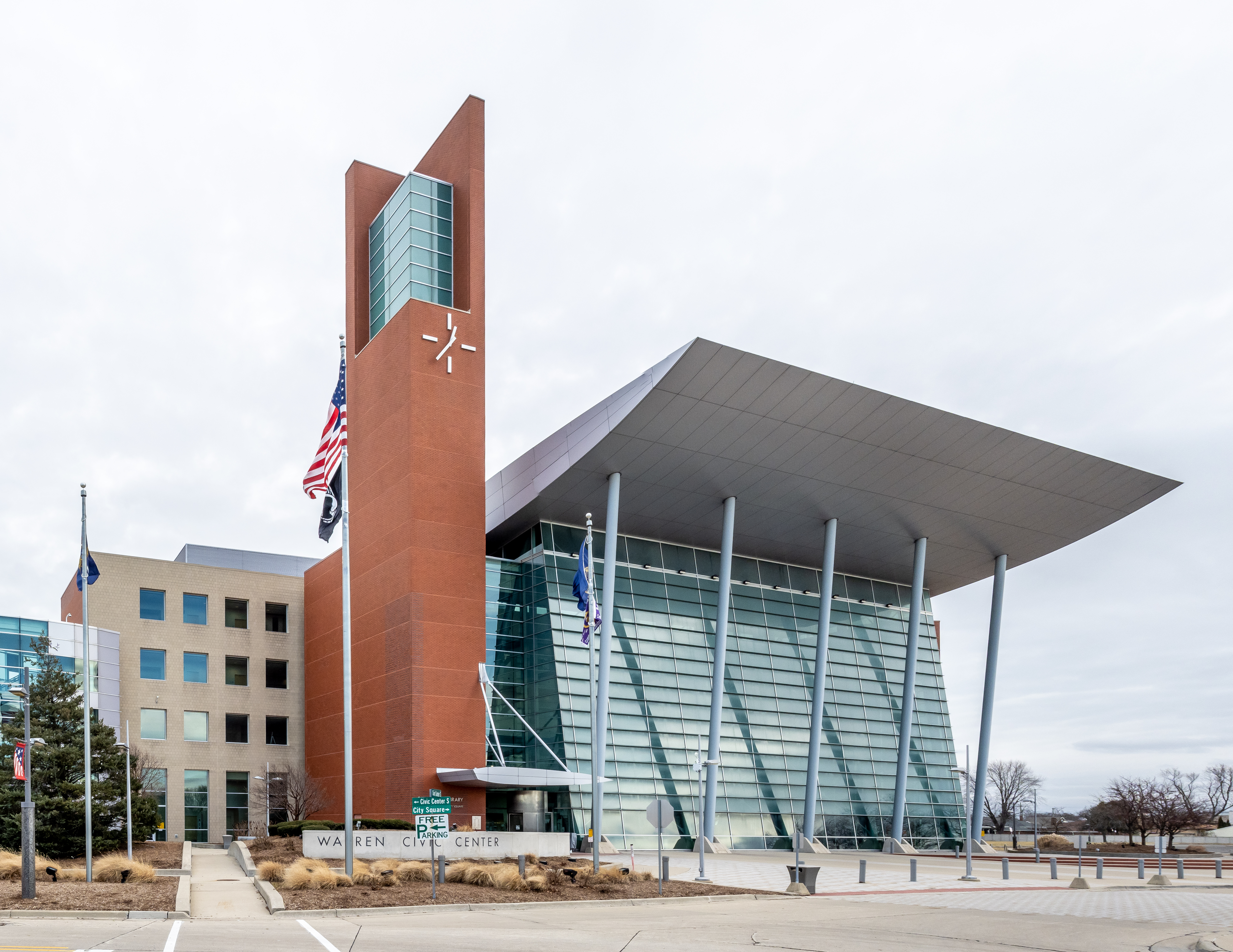
- Warren Civic Center (2020)

- Seal
- Motto: A Safe and Clean City
- Interactive map of Warren, Michigan
- Location within the state of Michigan Location within the United States
- Coordinates: 42°30′45″N 83°01′30″W
- Country: United States
- State: Michigan
- County: Macomb
- Founded: 1830
- Incorporated (village): 1893
- Incorporated (city): January 1, 1957

Government
  - Type: Strong mayor
  - Mayor: Lori Stone (D)
  - At-large: Dave Dwyer; Angela Rogensues
  - Councilmembers: Melody Magee; Jonathan Lafferty; Mindy Moore; >Gary Boike; Henry Newnan

Area
  - City: 34.434 sq mi (89.184 km^{2})
  - Land: 34.377 sq mi (89.036 km^{2})
  - Water: 0.056 sq mi (0.146 km^{2})
- Elevation: 620 ft (190 m)

Population (2020)
  - City: 139,387
  - Estimate (2023): 136,655
  - Rank: US: 204th MI: 3rd
  - Density: 3,980/sq mi (1,535/km^{2})
  - Urban: 3,776,890 (US: 12th)
  - Metro: 4,342,304 (US: 14th)
- Time zone: UTC−5 (Eastern (EST))
  - Summer (DST): UTC−4 (EDT)
- ZIP Codes: 48088, 48089, 48090, 48091, 48092, 48093, 48397
- Area code: 586
- FIPS code: 26-84000
- GNIS feature ID: 1615781
- Sales tax: 6.0%
- Website: cityofwarren.org

Warren is a city in Macomb County, Michigan, United States. An inner-ring suburb of Detroit, Warren borders Detroit to the north, roughly 13 miles (20.9 km) north of downtown Detroit. The population was 139,387 at the 2020 census, making Warren the largest community in Macomb County, the third-largest city in Michigan, and Detroit's largest suburb. The town has a history as a sundown town.

The city is home to a wide variety of businesses, including the General Motors Technical Center, the United States Army Detroit Arsenal, home of the United States Army TACOM Life Cycle Management Command, the Tank Automotive Research, Development and Engineering Center (TARDEC), and the headquarters of Asset Acceptance.

== History ==
Beebe's Corners, the original settlement in what would become the city of Warren, was founded in 1830 at the corner of Mound Road and Chicago Road; its first resident was Charles Groesbeck. Beebe's Corners was a carriage stop between Detroit and Utica, and included a distillery, mill, tavern, and trading post. In 1837 the now-defunct Warren Township was organized around the settlement; first under the name Hickory, then Aba in April 1838 and finally renamed Warren shortly thereafter. It was named for War of 1812 veteran and frontier cleric, Reverend Abel Warren. However, when it was originally organized the township was named for Reverend Warren, a Methodist Episcopal preacher who left his native New York in 1824 for Shelby Township. He went throughout the present-day Macomb, Lapeer, Oakland, and St. Clair Counties, baptizing, marrying, and burying pioneers of the area, as well as establishing congregations and preaching extensively. He was the first licensed preacher in the State of Michigan.

Another version of the source of the city's name claims it was "named for General Joseph Warren, who fell at the Battle of Bunker Hill."

The settlement was formally incorporated as the Village of Warren from Warren Township on April 28, 1893, out of one square mile bound by 14 Mile Road and 13 Mile Road to the north and south, and in half-a-mile east and west of Mound Road. The village had a population of 582 in 1940 and 727 in 1950, while the larger surrounding township grew at a much quicker pace. Much of this growth was due to the construction of the Chrysler's Truck Assembly plant in 1938, the Detroit Arsenal Tank Plant in 1940 to support the WW II effort, and the General Motors Technical Center between 1949 and 1956.

The Red Run and Bear Creek, just small creeks back in the 1800s, has been transformed into an open major inter-county stormdrain flowing through Warren, into the Clinton River, and onward to Lake St. Clair.

The Village of Warren and most of the surrounding Township of Warren, together with Van Dyke, incorporated as a city in 1957, less the city of Center Line, which had incorporated as a village from Warren Township in 1925 and as a city in 1936. Between 1950 and 1960, Warren's population increased from 42,653 to 89,426. This population explosion was largely fueled by the post-WWII Baby Boom and later, by white flight from its southern neighbor of Detroit in that decade. This change in population continued into the next decade when the city's population doubled again, ultimately reaching a high of 179,000 in 1970.

Historically, Warren was a sundown town: an all-white municipality that excluded non-whites through a combination of discriminatory practices, local ordinances, and violence. In 1970, Warren had a population of 180,000, with only 28 minority families, most of whom lived on a U.S. military base. As late as 1974, African Americans were practically nonexistent in Warren, In 2000 Warren had less than 3% Black population, compared to 80% in adjacent Detroit.

=== List of mayors in Warren, Michigan ===
The following is a list of the previous mayors of the city. The current mayor is Lori Stone. Mayoral elections are currently non-partisan.

Warren mayors
Order	Mayor	Mayoral elections	Start of term	End of term
1	Arthur J. Miller	D	January 1, 1957	December 30, 1960
2	Louis A. Kelsey	D	January 1, 1961	April 10, 1961
3	William (Bill) Shaw	D	April 11, 1961	April __, 1967
4	Ted Bates	D	April __, 1967	November 6, 1981
5	James R. Randlett	D	November 7, 1981	November 5, 1985
6	Ronald L. Bonkowski	D	November 6, 1985	November 7, 1995
7	Mark A. Steenbergh	D	November 7, 1995	November 9, 2007
8	James R. Fouts	D & I	November 9, 2007	November 17, 2023
9	Lori M. Stone	Democratic	November 18, 2023	Current

== Geography ==
According to the United States Census Bureau, the city has a total area of 34.434 square miles (89.18 km^{2}), of which 34.377 square miles (89.04 km^{2}) is land and 0.057 square miles (0.15 km^{2}) is water. The city covers a 6-by-6-mile (9.7 by 9.7 km) square (from 8 Mile Road to 14 Mile Road, south to north) in the southwest corner of Macomb County (minus the city of Center Line, which is a small city totally enclosed within Warren). Warren shares its entire southern border with the northern border of the Detroit city limits. Other cities bordering Warren are Hazel Park and Madison Heights to the west, Sterling Heights to the north, and Fraser, Roseville, and Eastpointe to the east.

=== Climate ===
Warren features a humid continental climate (Köppen: Dfa). Summers are somewhat hot with temperatures exceeding 90 °F (32 °C) on average 8.6 days. Winters are cold, with temperatures not rising above freezing on 39.1 days annually, while dropping to or below 0 °F (−18 °C) on average 1.2 days a year.

Climate data for Warren, Michigan (Eastpointe station)
Month	Jan	Feb	Mar	Apr	May	Jun	Jul	Aug	Sep	Oct	Nov	Dec	Year
Mean daily maximum °F (°C)	32.8 (0.4)	35.8 (2.1)	44.7 (7.1)	58.3 (14.6)	69.7 (20.9)	80.0 (26.7)	84.2 (29.0)	81.7 (27.6)	74.8 (23.8)	62.3 (16.8)	49.0 (9.4)	36.5 (2.5)	59.1 (15.1)
Daily mean °F (°C)	25.5 (−3.6)	27.3 (−2.6)	35.0 (1.7)	47.2 (8.4)	58.6 (14.8)	68.9 (20.5)	73.3 (22.9)	71.3 (21.8)	63.9 (17.7)	52.1 (11.2)	40.8 (4.9)	29.7 (−1.3)	49.5 (9.7)
Mean daily minimum °F (°C)	18.2 (−7.7)	18.8 (−7.3)	25.3 (−3.7)	36.0 (2.2)	47.5 (8.6)	57.7 (14.3)	62.3 (16.8)	60.8 (16.0)	52.9 (11.6)	41.9 (5.5)	32.5 (0.3)	22.9 (−5.1)	39.7 (4.3)
Average precipitation inches (mm)	1.86 (47)	1.82 (46)	2.27 (58)	3.07 (78)	3.23 (82)	3.38 (86)	3.22 (82)	3.38 (86)	3.45 (88)	2.75 (70)	3.05 (77)	2.49 (63)	33.97 (863)
Source: NOAA (normals 1981–2010)

== Demographics ==
Historical population
Census	Pop.	Note	%±
1900	890		—
1910	2,346		163.6%
1920	6,780		189.0%
1930	24,024		254.3%
1940	23,658		−1.5%
1950	42,653		80.3%
1960	89,246		109.2%
1970	179,260		100.9%
1980	161,134		−10.1%
1990	144,864		−10.1%
2000	138,247		−4.6%
2010	134,056		−3.0%
2020	139,387		4.0%
2023 (est.)	136,655		−2.0%
U.S. decennial census 2020 census

=== 2020 census ===
Warren city, Michigan – racial and ethnic composition Note: the US Census treats Hispanic/Latino as an ethnic category. This table excludes Latinos from the racial categories and assigns them to a separate category. Hispanics/Latinos may be of any race.
Race / ethnicity (NH = non-Hispanic)	Pop. 2000	Pop. 2010	Pop. 2020	% 2000	% 2010	% 2020
White alone (NH)	124,936	103,308	85,868	90.37%	77.06%	61.60%
Black or African American alone (NH)	3,676	17,978	28,179	2.66%	13.41%	20.22%
Native American or Alaska Native alone (NH)	466	524	344	0.34%	0.39%	0.25%
Asian alone (NH)	4,240	6,170	14,303	3.07%	4.60%	10.26%
Native Hawaiian or Pacific Islander alone (NH)	28	18	26	0.02%	0.01%	0.02%
Other race alone (NH)	168	140	629	0.12%	0.10%	0.45%
Mixed race or Multiracial (NH)	2,865	3,160	6,475	2.07%	2.36%	4.65%
Hispanic or Latino (any race)	1,868	2,758	3,563	1.35%	2.06%	2.56%
Total	138,247	134,056	139,387	100.00%	100.00%	100.00%

As of the 2020 census, there were 139,387 people, 54,933 households, and 34,601 families residing in the city. The population density was 4,054.7 inhabitants per square mile (1,565.5/km^{2}). There were 58,411 housing units. The racial makeup of the city was 62.4% White, 20.4% African American, 0.3% Native American, 10.3% Asian, 0.0% Pacific Islander, 1.0% from some other races and 5.7% from two or more races. Hispanic or Latino people of any race were 2.6% of the population.

Between 2010 and 2020, the Asian population in Warren doubled, increasing from 5% to 10%. This was due in large part to an increase in the Hmong and Bangladeshi populations.

==== 2022 American Community Survey (ACS) ====
There are 54,483 households accounted for in the 2022 ACS, with an average of 2.52 persons per household. The city's a median gross rent is $1,139 in the 2022 ACS. The 2022 ACS reports a median household income of $61,633, with 71.1% of households are owner occupied. 13.5% of the city's population lives at or below the poverty line (down from previous ACS surveys). The city boasts a 63.7% employment rate, with 19.9% of the population holding a bachelor's degree or higher and 86.3% holding a high school diploma.

The top nine reported ancestries (people were allowed to report up to two ancestries, thus the figures will generally add to more than 100%) were German (11.0%), Polish (8.8%), Irish (6.8%), Italian (5.8%), English (5.2%), Subsaharan African (4.0%), French (except Basque) (2.7%), Scottish (1.2%), and Norwegian (0.2%).

=== 2010 census ===
As of the 2010 census, there were 134,056 people, 53,442 households, and 34,185 families residing in the city. The population density was 3,899.2 inhabitants per square mile (1,505.5/km^{2}). There were 57,938 housing units at an average density of 1,685.2 per square mile (650.7/km^{2}). The racial makeup of the city was 78.4% White, 13.5% African American, 0.4% Native American, 4.6% Asian, 0.0% Pacific Islander, 0.4% from some other races and 2.6% from two or more races. Hispanic or Latino people of any race were 2.1% of the population.

There were 53,442 households, of which 30.6% had children under the age of 18 living with them, 42.2% were married couples living together, 15.9% had a female householder with no husband present, 5.9% had a male householder with no wife present, and 36.0% were non-families. 30.4% of all households were made up of individuals, and 12.6% had someone living alone who was 65 years of age or older. The average household size was 2.49 and the average family size was 3.11.

The median age in the city was 39.4 years. 22.7% of residents were under the age of 18; 9% were between the ages of 18 and 24; 26.1% were from 25 to 44; 26.1% were from 45 to 64; and 16.1% were 65 years of age or older. The gender makeup of the city was 48.4% male and 51.6% female.

The white population declined to 91.3% in 2000 and reached 78.4% as of the 2010 census.

=== 2000 census ===
As of the 2000 census, there were 138,247 people, 55,551 households, and 36,719 families residing in the city. The population density was 4,031.8 inhabitants per square mile (1,556.7/km^{2}). There were 57,249 housing units at an average density of 1,669.6 per square mile (644.6/km^{2}). The racial makeup of the city was 91.29% White, 2.67% African American, 0.36% Native American, 3.09% Asian, 0.02% Pacific Islander, 0.34% from some other races and 2.23% from two or more races. Hispanic or Latino people of any race were 1.35% of the population.

There were 55,551 households out of which 27.8% had children under the age of 18 living with them, 49.7% were married couples living together, 11.7% had a female householder with no husband present, and 33.9% were non-families. 28.8% of all households were made up of individuals and 12.0% had someone living alone who was 65 years of age or older. The average household size was 2.47 and the average family size was 3.05.

The city’s population was spread out with 22.9% under the age of 18, 7.6% from 18 to 24, 30.8% from 25 to 44, 21.4% from 45 to 64, and 17.3% who were 65 years of age or older. The median age was 38 years. For every 100 females there were 95.6 males. For every 100 females age 18 and over, there were 92.1 males.

The median income for a household in the city was $44,626, and the median income for a family was $52,444. Males had a median income of $41,454 versus $28,368 for females. The per capita income for the city was $21,407. 7.4% of the population and 5.2% of families were below the poverty line. Out of the total people living in poverty, 9.5% were under the age of 18 and 5.8% were 65 or older.

Warren's 2000 population was one of the oldest among large cities in the United States. 16.1% of Warren's population was 65 or older at the last census, tied for fifth with Hollywood, Florida, among cities with 100,000+ population, and in fact the highest-ranking city by this measure outside of Florida or Hawaii. Warren is ranked 1st in the nation for longevity of residence. Residents of Warren on average have lived in that community 35.5 years, compared to the national average of eight years for communities of 100,000+ population. Warren remains a population center for people of Polish, Lebanese, Ukrainian, Albanian, Scots-Irish, Filipino, Maltese and Assyrian descent.

In 2000 there were 1,026 Filipinos in Warren as well as 1,145 Asian Indians in the city, and 1,559 American Indians. Many of the American Indians in Warren originated in the Southern United States with 429 Cherokee and 66 Lumbee. The Lumbee were the third largest American Indian "tribe" in the city, with only the 193 Chippewa outnumbering them.

==== 1950 to 1990 censuses ====
There are a number of distinguishing characteristics about Warren which render it unique among American cities of its relative size. Warren was one of the fastest-growing municipalities in the country between 1940 and 1970, roughly doubling its population every 10 years. In 1940 the official population of Warren Township was 22,146; in 1950, it was 42,653; in 1960, after Warren Township had become the City of Warren, population had risen to 89,240; and by 1970 it had grown to 179,260.

In the late 20th century, Warren was one of the fastest-declining cities in population in the country. After peaking in 1970, the city’s population declined by 10% during each of the next two decades (1980: 161,060; 1990: 144,864), then dropped by 4.6% between 1990 and 2000.

In 1970, whites made up 99.5% of the city's total population of 179,270; only 838 non-whites lived within the city limits. In the ensuing two decades the white portion of the city dropped gradually to 98.2% in 1980 and 97.3% as of 1990.

== Economy ==
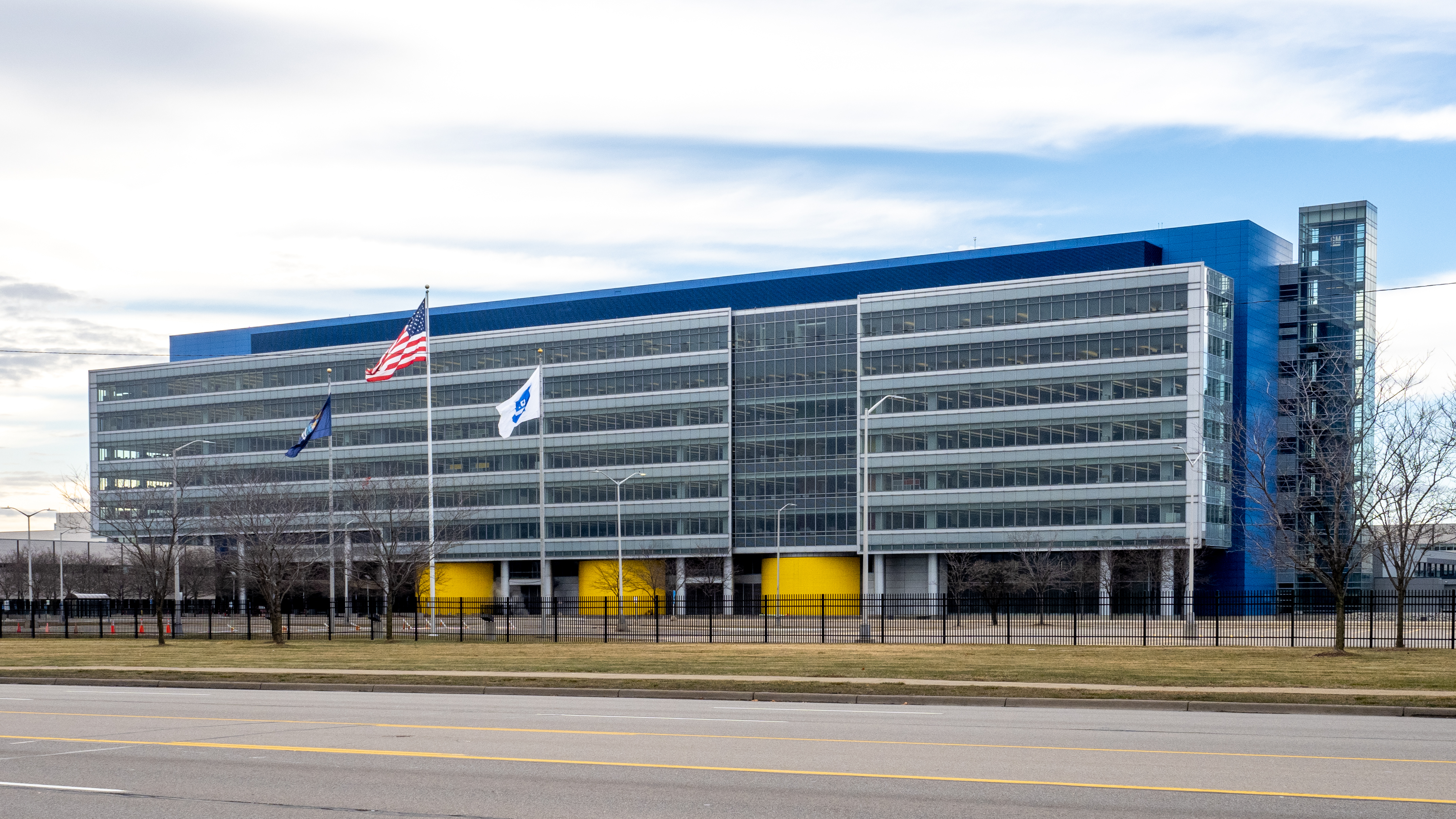
The General Motors Technical Center

=== Top employers ===
According to the city's 2022 Annual Comprehensive Financial Report, the top five employers in the city are:

Five top employers in Warren
Rank	Employer	No. of employees
1	General Motors	23,823
2	Government of the United States	7,800
3	Stellantis	5,523
4	Ascension Health	2,407
5	Lipari Foods	1,300

== Government and infrastructure ==
=== Municipal government ===
The Warren municipal government is composed of a mayor, city council, clerk, and various boards and commissions. Boards include the Zoning Board of Appeals, Board of Review, Employee Retirement Board of Trustees, and Construction Board of Appeals. Commissions include Animal Welfare, Beautification, Compensation, Crime, Cultural, Disabilities, Historical, Housing, Library, Planning, Police & Fire, and Village Historic District Commissions.

==== First Amendment lawsuit ====
The City of Warren established a Christian prayer station at city hall that is operated by the Pentecostal Tabernacle Church of Warren. Douglas Marshall requested establishing a reason station. Mayor James R. Fouts personally refused to grant Marshall's request in a letter based, in part, on the claim that the station would disrupt those using the prayer station. The American Civil Liberties Union, Americans United for Separation of Church and State, and Freedom from Religion Foundation jointly filed a complaint against the city. In 2015 there was a $100,000 judgment against the city government and Mayor James R. Fouts for denying Marshall the right to establish his atheist station.

=== Federal representation ===
The United States Postal Service operates the Warren Post Office.

== Neighborhoods ==
=== Southeast Warren (48089) ===
Southeast Warren consists of the Belangers Garden, Berkshire Manor, Piper Van Dyke, Warrendale, and the southern portion of Warren Woods. The neighborhood population in 2009 was 33,031. The neighborhood's racial makeup was 70.14% White, 15.50% African-American, 2.27% Asian, 0.38% Native American, and 6.80% of other races. 1.84% were Hispanic or Latino of any race.

The neighborhood's median household income in 2009 was $35,136. The per capita income was $15,301.

Much of Southeast Warren's residential architecture is based on the bungalows built immediately after World War II. To the north of Stephens Road, many homes were built after 1960 in the brick ranch style. Besides the residential areas, Southeast Warren is also occupied by multiple industrial parks.

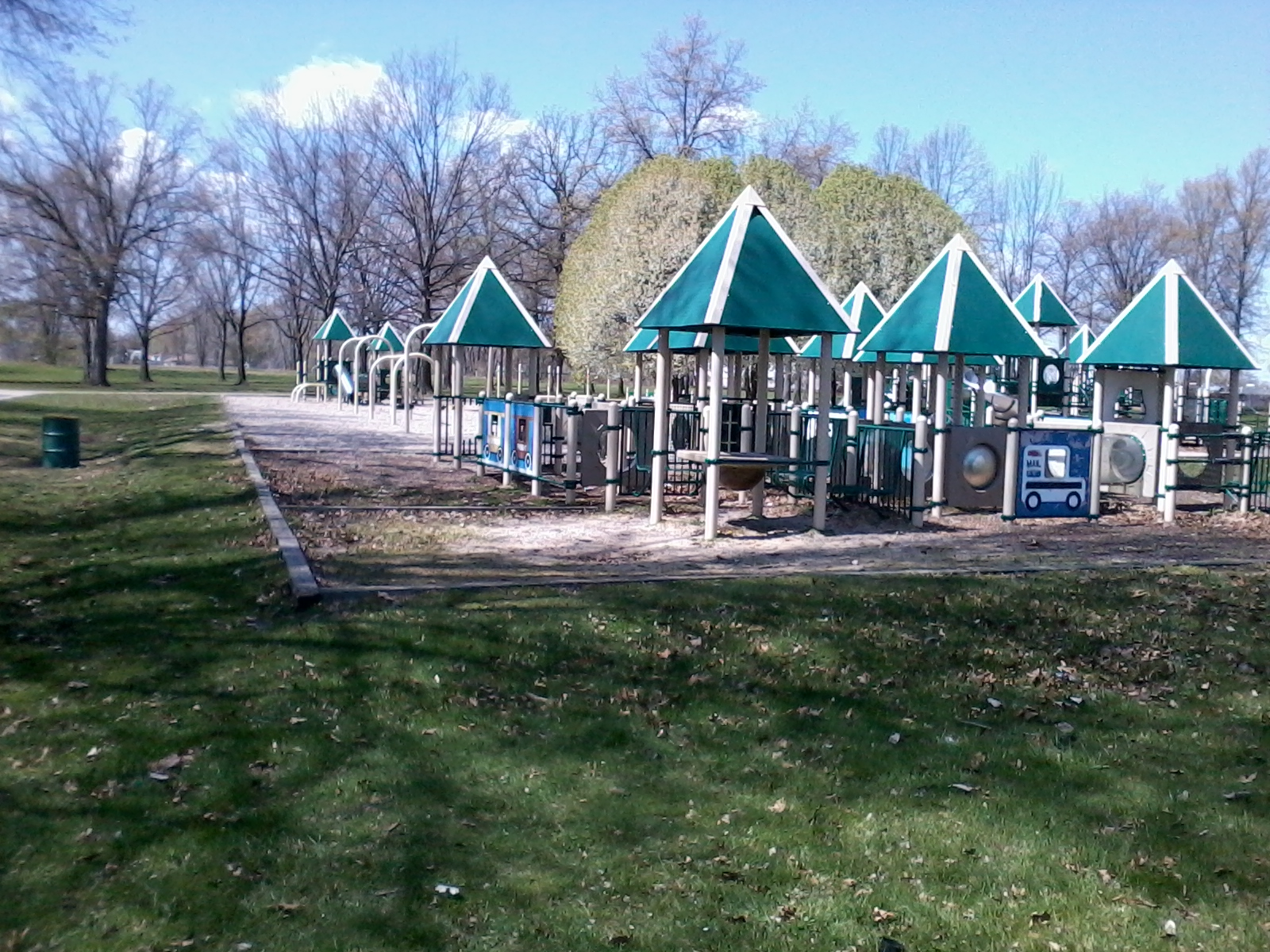
Shaw Park, located in Southwest Warren

=== Southwest Warren (48091) ===
Southwest Warren consists of the Beierman Farms and Fitzgerald neighborhoods. The neighborhood population in 2009 was 30,876. The neighborhood's racial makeup was 81.98% White, 7.9% African-American, 4.98% Asian, 0.48% Native American, and 4.23% of other races. 1.64% were Hispanic or Latino of any race.

The neighborhood's median household income in 2009 was $40,311. The per capita income was $19,787.

=== Northeast Warren (48090, 48093, 48088) ===
Northeast Warren consists of the Bear Creek, Bella Vista Estates, Downtown, Fairlane Estates, Lorraine, Northampton Square, the northern portion of Warren Woods, and the eastern portion of Warren Con neighborhoods. The neighborhood population in 2009 was 45,492. The neighborhood's racial makeup was 92.47% White, 2.93% African American, 2.78% Asian, 0.5% Native American and 3.75% of other races. 1.36% were Hispanic or Latino of any race.

The neighborhood's median household income in 2009 was $48,806. The per capita income was $27,914.

=== Northwest Warren/Warren Con. (48092) ===
Northwest Warren consists of the western portion of the Warren Con neighborhood. The neighborhood population in 2009 was 24,997. The neighborhood's racial makeup was 85.50% White, 4.58% African American, 6.57% Asian, 0.19% Native American and 3.50% of other races. 1.32% were Hispanic or Latino of any race.

The median household income in 2009 was $55,102. The per capita income was $25,334.

== Education ==
=== Public schools ===
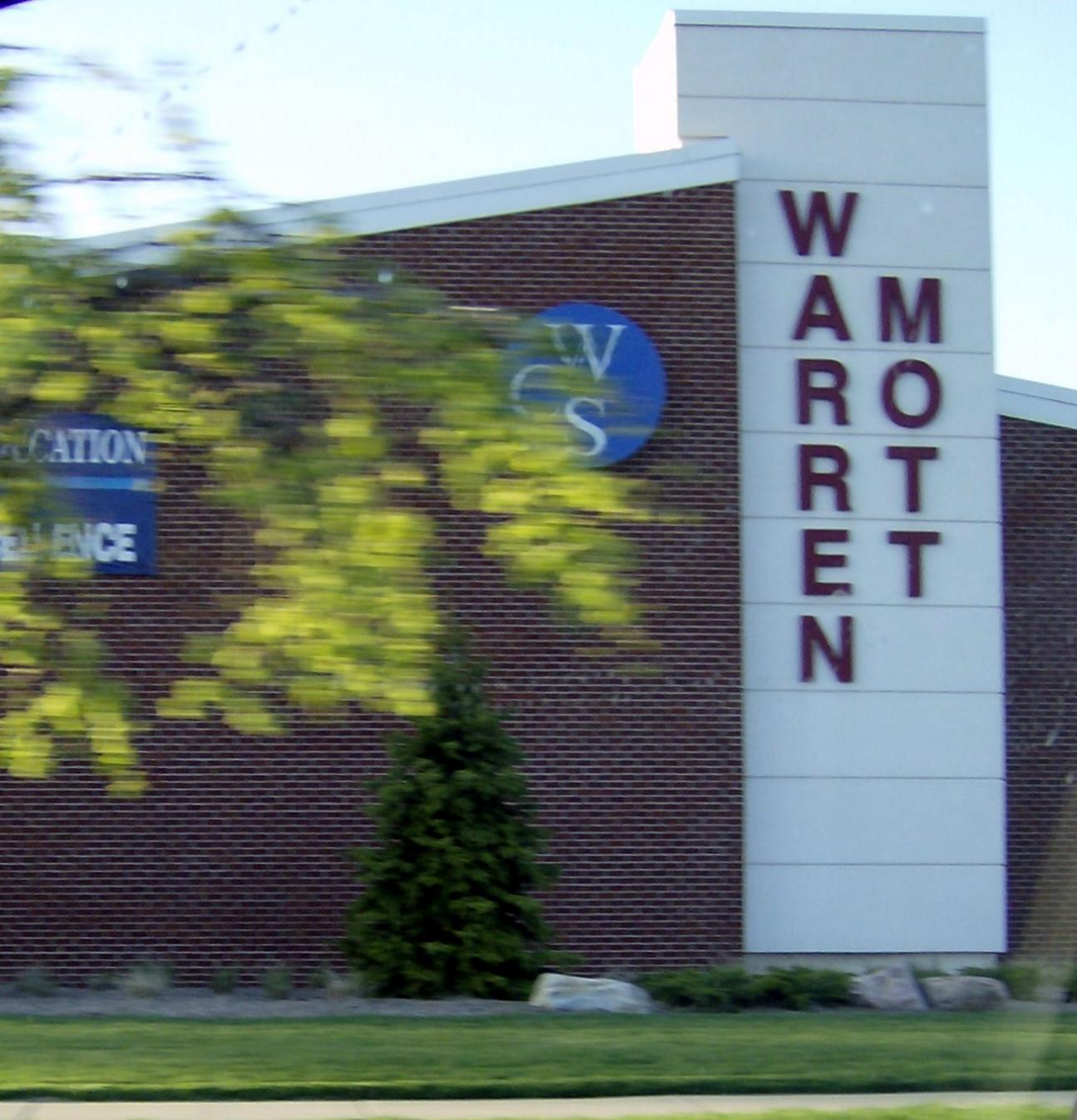
Warren Mott High School

Warren is served by six public school districts:

- Center Line Public Schools
- Eastpointe Community Schools
- Fitzgerald Public Schools
- Van Dyke Public Schools
- Warren Consolidated Schools
- Warren Woods Public Schools

The Macomb Intermediate School District oversees the individual school districts.

Secondary schools serving Warren include:

- Warren Woods Tower High School
- Paul K. Cousino Sr. High School
- Lincoln High School
- Warren Mott High School
- Fitzgerald High School
- Center Line High School (Center Line)
- Eastpointe High School (Eastpointe)

Charter schools:

- Michigan Collegiate

=== Private schools ===
- Crown of Life Lutheran School
- De La Salle Collegiate High School (all-boys)
- Regina High School (all-girls)
- Mary Help of Christians Academy (1986–99)

=== Postsecondary institutions ===
- Macomb Community College (South Campus)
- Davenport University
- Wayne State University's Advanced Technology Education Center

=== Public libraries ===
Warren Public Library consists of one main library and three branches. The Civic Center Library is located on the ground floor of the city hall. The Arthur Miller Branch is inside the Warren Community Center. The other two branches are the Maybelle Burnette Branch and the Dorothy Busch Branch.

On July 1, 2010, the three branch libraries were closed. On August 3, the Library Millage was approved; as such, these branch libraries reopened later that August.

== Health care ==
The headquarters of the St. John Providence Health System are in the St. John Providence Health Corporate Services Building in Warren.

== Religion ==
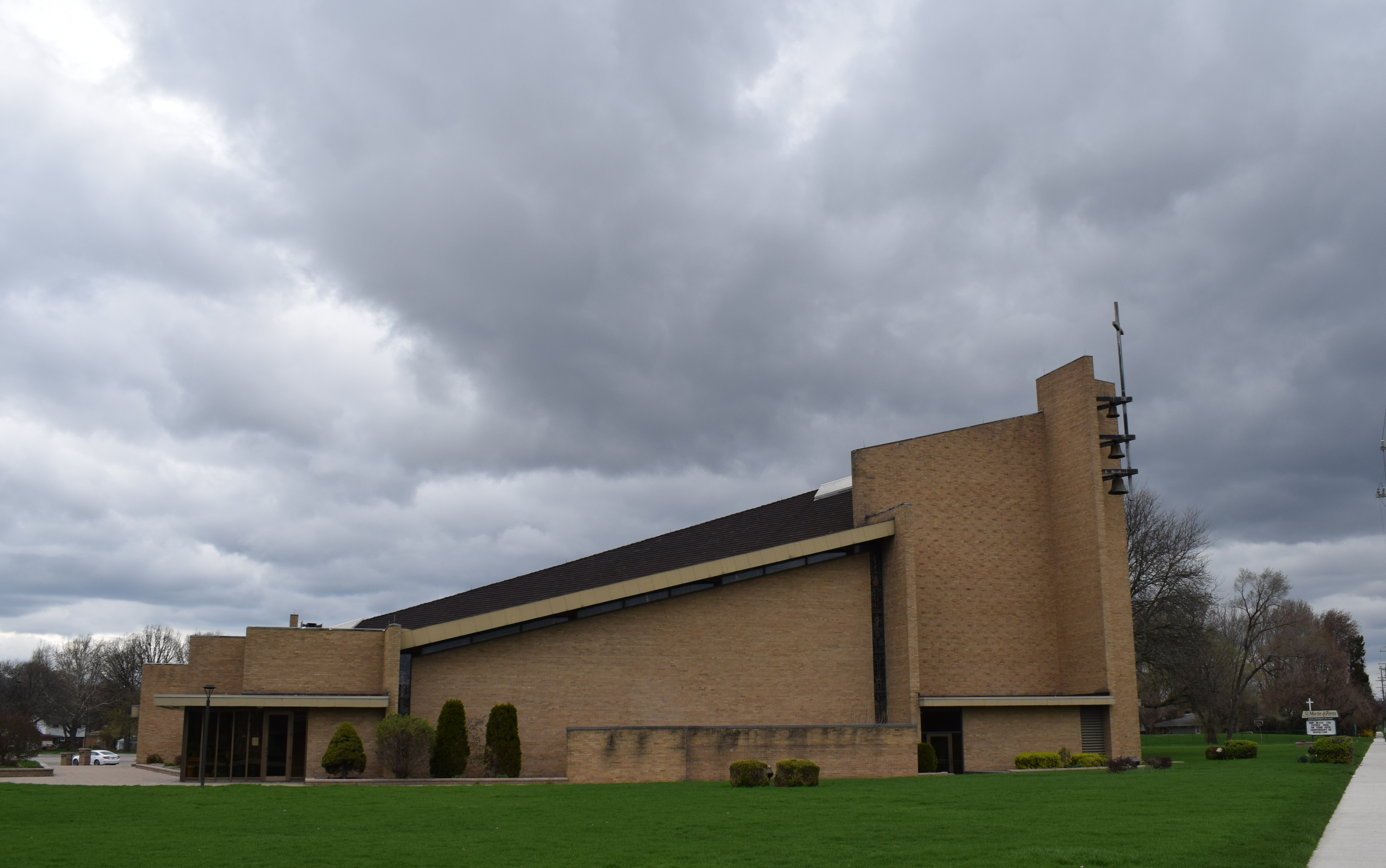
St. Martin de Porres Church in Warren

The Roman Catholic Archdiocese of Detroit operates Catholic Churches.

Our Lady of Grace Vietnamese Parish (Vietnamese: Gx Đức Mẹ Ban Ơn Lành) is in Warren. Our Lady of Grace was previously in Eastpointe, but moved to Warren in 2011 when it merged with St. Cletus Church. St. Cletus had a predominately native-born population and had a declining parishioner base, and it could not find enough priests to staff the facility; meanwhile Our Lady of Grace had an increasing parishioner base and was asking for a larger facility.

Other parishes include St. Faustina Parish, St. Louise de Marillac Parish, St. Mark Parish, St. Martin de Porres Parish, and St. Mary-Our Lady Queen of Families Parish (St. Dorothy Site). St. Mark's first building opened in 1943.

St. Mary, Our Lady Queen of Families was formed by the 2007 merger of Ascension Parish, St. Clement Parish, St. Leonard of Port Maurice Parish, and St. Teresa of Avila Parish. St. Faustina Church formed in 2013 through the merger of St. Edmund Church and St. Sylvester Church.

== Culture and recreation ==
The City of Warren has a Department of Parks and Recreation which oversees the Aquatic, Community, and Fitness Centers along with a system of 24 parks, including Halmich Park.

The Warren Symphony Orchestra gives several concerts per season, and changed its name to the Warren Symphony Orchestra in 2016.

In 2003 the city built a new community center where the old Warren High School had been.

There is also a nine-member Cultural Commission.

Universal Mall, an enclosed shopping mall, was built in the city in 1965. In 2009, it was demolished for a new outdoor shopping center.

The Italian American Cultural Society (IACS) was located in Warren for 20 years. In 2004 it moved to its current location in Clinton Township. Its previous location was sold to a charter school in July 2004.

== Transportation ==
Conrail Shared Assets Operations provides freight rail service to Warren.

Suburban Mobility Authority for Regional Transportation provides bus service to Warren.

=== Major highways ===
- I-696 (Walter P. Reuther Freeway) cuts east and west through the city.
- M-53 (Van Dyke Avenue), which is also known as the Earle Memorial Highway, runs north and south and (roughly) bisects the city.
- M-97 (Groesbeck Highway) is located in southeast Warren. It comes north from Detroit, and is a fast and wide diagonal connector to northern Macomb County.
- M-102 (8 Mile Road), also known as Base Line Road, is the city's southern border and the Macomb-Wayne county line.

=== Unnumbered roads ===
Mound Road is an important north–south artery in the city. East-west travel is mainly on the mile roads. Most notable are 8 Mile Road, which is on the southern border of Warren with Detroit; 11 Mile Road, which serves as a service drive for I-696, and 14 Mile Road, which is on the northern border of Warren with Sterling Heights.

== Crime ==
Warren
- Crime rates* (2023)

Violent crimes
- Homicide: 7
- Rape: 94
- Robbery: 120
- Aggravated assault: 526
- Total violent crime: 747

Property crimes
- Burglary: 259
- Larceny-theft: 1,023
- Motor vehicle theft: 222
- Arson: 16
- Total property crime: 2,670
- Note: Reported crimes per 100,000 population Source: 2023 FBI UCR Data

The Warren Police Department serves as the main law enforcement agency in the city.

== Historical markers ==
There are nine recognized Michigan historical markers in the city. They are:

- Detroit Arsenal Tank Plant, which built a quarter of the Sherman tanks produced by the United States in World War II and (along with a plant in Lima, Ohio) produced M1 Abrams tanks until 1996.
- Detroit Memorial Park Cemetery, where inventor Elijah McCoy is buried (as noted on the historical marker). Former member of the band The Supremes Florence Ballard is also buried there.
- Erin–Warren Fractional District No. 2 Schoolhouse, technically located in Eastpointe, Michigan, but included due to its proximity (both in distance and in history) to Warren.
- General Motors Technical Center
- Warren Truck Assembly
- Governor Alexander Joseph Groesbeck, which marks his birthplace and is located north of 12 Mile Rd. on Mound Rd.
- John Theisen House
- Village of Warren
- Warren Township District No. 4 School
- Warren Union Cemetery

The tenth and eleventh markers are technically in Center Line, Michigan, but are included because of their proximity (both in distance and in history) to Warren:

- St. Clement Catholic Church
- St. Clement Catholic Cemetery

Additionally, about two dozen markers have been placed around designated sites in the city by the Warren Historical and Genealogical Society.

== Notable people ==
- Alex Avila, major league baseball catcher
- Bruiser Brody, professional wrestler
- Jim Daniels, writer
- Michael Danna, NFL player
- Danny Dekeyser, retired NHL player
- Eminem, rapper and recording artist
- Denny Felsner, former NHL player
- Norman Geisler, Christian theologian and philosopher
- Harry Gozzard, jazz musician
- Alex J. Groesbeck, former governor of Michigan
- Bryan Herta, racing driver
- Grant Hochstein, figure skater
- Matt Hunwick, NHL player
- I See Stars, electronicore band, formed in Warren
- Joe Kopicki, NBA player
- Mitch Ryder, rock and roll singer and recording artist
- John Smoltz, MLB pitcher in Hall of Fame
- Tom Stanton, New York Times bestselling author
- Matt Taormina, NHL player
- Blair Underwood, actor
- Doug Weight, retired NHL player
- Johnny White, racing driver
- John Wojciechowski, NFL player
