= Halmich Park =

Park in Macomb County, Michigan, United States of America

- Location within the United States
- 42°52′36″N 83°07′54″W
- Location: Warren, Michigan / Macomb County, Michigan; United States

Site notes
- Area: 80 acres (32 ha)
- Governing body: City of Warren
- Visitors: 151,343 (in 2007)

Halmich Park, is located on 13 Mile between Ryan Road and Dequindre Rd. in Warren, Michigan.

Halmich Park spans an area of 80 acres (320,000 m^{2}). Dozens of species of mammals, birds, amphibians, and insects have been documented.
