= John Ladue =

American politician

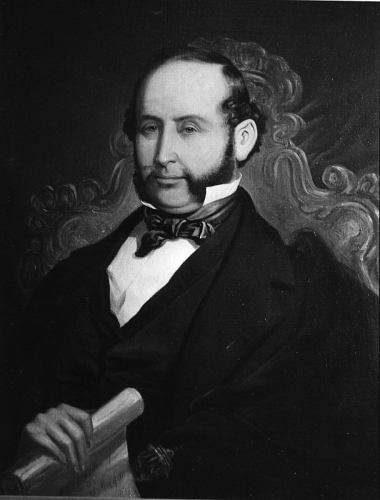

Mayor of Detroit
- In office 1850–1850
- Preceded by: Charles Howard
- Succeeded by: Zachariah Chandler

Personal details
- Born: November 18, 1804 Lansingburgh, New York
- Died: December 1, 1854 (aged 51) Detroit, Michigan
- Spouse: Mary Angel

John Ladue (November 18, 1804 – December 1, 1854) was mayor of Detroit, Michigan in 1850.

== Biography ==
John Ladue was born November, 1804 in Lansingburgh, New York, the son of Peter and Mary Tallman Ladue. In 1827, he married Mary Angel. The couple had four children who outlived their father: John T. E. A. Ladue, Charlotte M. Ladue, George N. Ladue, and Austin Y. Ladue.

In the 1840s, John's brother Andrew moved to Detroit with his family and established a tannery. John Ladue followed Andrew to Detroit in 1847, and began in the business of manufacturing leather and purchasing wool, with a store on Michigan Avenue at Campus Martius Park. He was popular among the business community, and in 1850 was elected mayor. During his term as mayor, a fugitive slave was arrested and jailed in Detroit. The local populace mobilized to free the man, and Ladue called out federal troops to preserve the peace. To head off potential conflict, Ladue solicited donations from leading Detroit citizens to purchase the slave, and then freed him.

John Ladue died December 1, 1854.

Political offices
Preceded by Charles Howard	Mayor of Detroit; 1850	Succeeded by Zachariah Chandler
