= Mary Help of Christians Academy (Warren, Michigan) =

Coordinates: 42°30′3.8″N 83°04′30.1″W

Information
- Religious affiliation: Catholicism
- Established: 1986
- Closed: 2004
- Grades: K-12

Mary Help of Christians Academy was a small, Traditionalist Catholic K-12 school located in Warren, Michigan. It was founded by Donald Sanborn in 1986 with the purchase of a former Montessori school campus. From a few families it expanded to around 200 students at its peak of enrollment.

Internal disagreement between parents and school management (then including Robert Neville) in 1999 caused a number of families to leave. The school's teachers were dismissed from their positions and replaced with nuns from Robert McKenna's Sisters of the Immaculate Heart of Mary. Enrollment continued to decline and the school was closed in 2004. The campus was sold to a local Eastern Orthodox church.

== Notes and references ==
- RenewAmerica: News update on the closure of the school
