= 2008 NBA Development League draft =

General information
- Sport: Basketball
- Date: November 7, 2008
- Location: Atlanta, Georgia
- Network: NBA TV

Overview
- League: NBA
- First selection: Chris Richard, Tulsa 66ers

The 2008 NBA Development League Draft was the seventh NBA Development League draft. It was held on November 7, 2008, at 7:00pm Eastern Time. The Tulsa 66ers selected the 6'9" forward Chris Richard with the first overall pick.

== First round ==
Pick	Player	Nationality	D-League Team	College/HS/Club Team
1	Chris Richard	United States	Tulsa 66ers	Florida
2	James Mays	United States; Central African Republic	Colorado 14ers	Clemson
3	Jermareo Davidson	United States	Idaho Stampede	Alabama
4	Gary Forbes	Panama	Sioux Falls Skyforce	UMass
5	Derrick Byars	United States	Bakersfield Jam	Vanderbilt
6	Coleman Collins	United States	Fort Wayne Mad Ants	Virginia Tech
7	Erik Daniels	United States	Erie BayHawks	Kentucky
8	Tierre Brown	United States	Anaheim Arsenal	McNeese State
9	Denham Brown	Canada	Utah Flash	UConn
10	Antonio Meeking	United States	Reno Bighorns	Louisiana Tech
11	Marcus Hubbard	United States	Dakota Wizards	Angelo State
12	Smush Parker	United States	Rio Grande Valley Vipers	Fordham
13	Jasper Johnson	United States	Los Angeles D-Fenders	Delta State
14	David Noel	United States	Albuquerque Thunderbirds	North Carolina
15	Cartier Martin	United States	Iowa Energy	Kansas State
16	Robert McKiver	United States	Austin Toros	Houston

== Second round ==
Pick	Player	Nationality	D-League Team	College/HS/Club Team
1	Mohamed Abukar	United States	Austin Toros	San Diego State
2	Larry Ayuso	Puerto Rico	Iowa Energy	USC
3	David Monds	United States	Albuquerque Thunderbirds	Oklahoma State
4	Keith Butler	United States	Los Angeles D-Fenders	DePaul
5	Delonte Holland	United States	Rio Grande Valley Vipers	DePaul
6	Aaron Spears	United States	Dakota Wizards	St. John's
7	Russell Robinson	United States	Reno Bighorns	Kansas
8	Gavin Grant	United States	Utah Flash	NC State
9	James White	United States	Anaheim Arsenal	Cincinnati
10	Taj McCullough	United States	Erie BayHawks	Winthrop
11	Toree Morris	United States	Fort Wayne Mad Ants	Pittsburgh
12	Terrance Thomas	United States	Bakersfield Jam	Baylor
13	Ty Morrison	United States	Sioux Falls Skyforce	Grand Canyon
14	Ernest Scott	United States	Idaho Stampede	Valdosta State
15	Trey Gilder	United States	Colorado 14ers	Northwestern State
16	Moses Ehambe	United States	Tulsa 66ers	Oral Roberts

== Third round ==
Pick	Player	Nationality	D-League Team	College/HS/Club Team
1	Yemi Ogunoye	United States	Tulsa 66ers	Oral Roberts
2	Marlon Parmer	United States	Colorado 14ers	Kentucky Wesleyan
3	Anthony Coleman	United States	Idaho Stampede	Long Beach State
4	Elgrace Wilborn	United States	Sioux Falls Skyforce	Western Kentucky
5	Terrence Gamble	United States	Bakersfield Jam	Tarleton State
6	Shawn Hawkins	United States	Fort Wayne Mad Ants	Long Beach State
7	Vernon Hamilton	United States	Erie BayHawks	Clemson
8	Roy Bright	United States	Anaheim Arsenal	Delaware State
9	Bennet Davis	United States	Utah Flash	Northeastern
10	Sung-Yoon Bang	South Korea	Reno Bighorns	Yonsei
11	Tony Murphy	United States	Dakota Wizards	Norfolk State
12	Kurt Looby	Antigua and Barbuda	Rio Grande Valley Vipers	Iowa
13	Dominique Scales	United States	Los Angeles D-Fenders	East Central
14	Waki Williams	United States	Albuquerque Thunderbirds	Memphis
15	Othyus Jeffers	United States	Iowa Energy	Robert Morris (IL)
16	Ezra Williams	United States	Austin Toros	Georgia

== Fourth round ==
Pick	Player	Nationality	D-League Team	College/HS/Club Team
1	Kris Collins	United States	Austin Toros	New Mexico
2	Marcel Jones	United States; New Zealand	Iowa Energy	Oregon State
3	Pierre Darden	United States	Albuquerque Thunderbirds	Cumberlands (KY)
4	Curtis Terry	United States	Los Angeles D-Fenders	UNLV
5	Alpha Bangura	Libya; Sierra Leone	Rio Grande Valley Vipers	St. John's
6	Jawann McClellan	United States	Dakota Wizards	Arizona
7	Marcus Sloan	United States	Reno Bighorns	TCU
8	Carlos Wheeler	United States	Utah Flash	Campbellsville
9	Tony Key	United States	Anaheim Arsenal	Mountain State
10	Oliver Lafayette	United States; Croatia	Erie BayHawks	Houston
11	Ryan Bright	United States	Fort Wayne Mad Ants	Sam Houston State
12	Jovan Harris	United States	Bakersfield Jam	San Francisco
13	Gary Ervin	United States	Sioux Falls Skyforce	Arkansas
14	Antoine Jordan	United States	Idaho Stampede	Siena
15	Dominique Coleman	United States	Colorado 14ers	Colorado
16	Adam Liberty	United States	Tulsa 66ers	Oral Roberts

== Fifth round ==
Pick	Player	Nationality	D-League Team	College/HS/Club Team
1	Mikheil Berishvili	Georgia	Tulsa 66ers	B.C. VITA Tbilisi
2	John Gilchrist	United States	Colorado 14ers	Maryland
3	Mildon Ambres	United States	Idaho Stampede	Southern Nazarene
4	DeMario Williams	United States	Sioux Falls Skyforce	Miles
5	David Berghoefer	United States	Bakersfield Jam	Western Carolina
6	Brian Morrison	United States	Fort Wayne Mad Ants	UCLA
7	Quinton Day	United States	Erie BayHawks	Missouri-Kansas City
8	Kirk Walters	United States	Anaheim Arsenal	Arizona
9	Calvin Brown	United States	Utah Flash	Norfolk State
10	Charlie Parker	United States	Reno Bighorns	Millersville
11	Brad Stricker	United States	Dakota Wizards	Georgia State
12	Thomas Sanders	United States	Rio Grande Valley Vipers	Gardner–Webb
13	Jamaal Brown	United States	Los Angeles D-Fenders	Cal State Fullerton
14	Eddie Robinson	United States	Albuquerque Thunderbirds	Central Oklahoma
15	Marvin Phillips	United States	Iowa Energy	Claflin
16	Michael Sturns	United States	Austin Toros	North Texas

== Sixth round ==
Pick	Player	Nationality	D-League Team	College/HS/Club Team
1	Isaiah Fox	United States	Austin Toros	Arizona
2	K.J. Garland	United States	Iowa Energy	UNC Asheville
3	Steve Allen	United States	Albuquerque Thunderbirds	Clemson
4	Terrance Whiters	United States	Los Angeles D-Fenders	Arkansas Tech
5	Boomer Herndon	United States	Rio Grande Valley Vipers	Belmont
6	Tim Drisdom	United States	Dakota Wizards	Utah
7	Garry Hill-Thomas	United States	Reno Bighorns	Nevada
8	John Barber	United States	Utah Flash	Youngstown State
9	Theo Little	United States	Anaheim Arsenal	Arkansas State
10	Tejay Anderson	United States	Erie BayHawks	Youngstown State
11	Jerod Adler	United States	Fort Wayne Mad Ants	Indiana State
12	Michael Hart	United States	Bakersfield Jam	Northern Illinois
13	Keith Brumbaugh	United States	Sioux Falls Skyforce	Hillsborough (CC)
14	Lanny Smith	United States	Idaho Stampede	Houston
15	Julius Page	United States	Colorado 14ers	Pittsburgh
16	Kejuan Johnson	United States	Tulsa 66ers	Long Beach State

== Seventh round ==
Pick	Player	Nationality	D-League Team	College/HS/Club Team
1	Donny Beacham	United States	Tulsa 66ers	UT Arlington
2	David Godbold	United States	Colorado 14ers	Oklahoma
3	Casey Cook	United States	Idaho Stampede	UC Santa Barbara
4	Brock Gillespie	United States	Sioux Falls Skyforce	Rice
5	Joseph Britto	United States	Bakersfield Jam	UMass Dartmouth
6	Derrick Allen	United States	Fort Wayne Mad Ants	Valdosta State
7	Raheem Moss	United States	Erie BayHawks	Cleveland State
8	Aleksandar Ugrinoski	North Macedonia; Croatia	Anaheim Arsenal	KK Cibona
9	Torrington Cox	Bahamas	Utah Flash	King (TN)
10	Alex Bausley	United States	Reno Bighorns	Sacramento State
11	Darius Mattear	United States	Dakota Wizards	UTEP
12	Jeffrey Day	United States	Rio Grande Valley Vipers	Creighton
13	Kenny Barnes	United States	Los Angeles D-Fenders	San Francisco
14	Kris Clack	United States	Albuquerque Thunderbirds	Texas
15	Chris Rodgers	United States	Iowa Energy	Arizona
16	Andrew Francis	United States	Austin Toros	Texas-San Antonio

== Eighth round ==
Pick	Player	Nationality	D-League Team	College/HS/Club Team
1	Jahmar Thorpe	United States	Austin Toros	Houston
2	Marcus Doss	United States	Iowa Energy	Auburn-Montgomery
3	Lorenzo Davis	United States	Albuquerque Thunderbirds	Mountain State
4	Brandon Worthy	United States	Los Angeles D-Fenders	Loyola Marymount
5	Lance Perique	United States	Rio Grande Valley Vipers	Georgia State
6	Tim Blackwell	United States	Dakota Wizards	Missouri-Kansas City
7	Dave Noel	United States	Reno Bighorns	UCF
8	Eddie Ard	United States	Utah Flash	Lipscomb
9	Bryce Sheldon	United States	Anaheim Arsenal	South Carolina
10	Wesley Fluellen	United States	Erie BayHawks	Robert Morris
11	Reggie Nelson	United States	Fort Wayne Mad Ants
12	Jejuan Plair	United States	Bakersfield Jam	Sam Houston State
13	Mike Adams	United States	Sioux Falls Skyforce	Youngstown State
14	Rashad West	United States	Idaho Stampede	Hampton
15	Erik Parker	United States	Colorado 14ers	Wayne State
16	Derrick Dial	United States	Tulsa 66ers	Eastern Michigan

== Ninth round ==
Pick	Player	Nationality	D-League Team	College/HS/Club Team
1	Dock Wrice	United States	Tulsa 66ers
2	Tony Champion	United States	Colorado 14ers	Sacramento State
3	L.P. Levros	Canada	Idaho Stampede	Rhode Island (CC)
4	Keith Benjamin	United States	Sioux Falls Skyforce	Pittsburgh
5	Demarcus Hall	United States	Bakersfield Jam	Cal State Bakersfield
6	Isaiah Kottke	United States	Fort Wayne Mad Ants	Master's College (CA)
7	Cliff Clinkscales	United States	Erie BayHawks	DePaul
8	Ronald Allen	United States	Anaheim Arsenal	Cincinnati
9	Casey Love III	United States	Utah Flash	Robert Morris
10	Marcus Heard	United States	Reno Bighorns	DePaul
11	Michael Peeples	United States	Dakota Wizards	Fairleigh Dickinson
12	Keoni Watson	United States	Rio Grande Valley Vipers	Idaho
13	Seth Robinson	United States	Los Angeles D-Fenders	Boise State
14	Mike Strawberry	United States	Albuquerque Thunderbirds	Chaffey (CC)
15	Brian Evans	United States	Iowa Energy	Texas A&M–Corpus Christi
16	Marshall Brown	United States	Austin Toros	Missouri

== Tenth round ==
Pick	Player	Nationality	D-League Team	College/HS/Club Team
1	O'Neal Mims	United States	Austin Toros	Angelo State
2	Jermaine Green	United States	Iowa Energy	North Texas
3	Fred Gibson	United States	Albuquerque Thunderbirds	Georgia
4	John White	United States	Los Angeles D-Fenders
5	J.R. Harrison	United States	Rio Grande Valley Vipers	Rice
6	Carlos English	United States	Dakota Wizards	Cleveland State
7	John Millsap	United States	Reno Bighorns	Texas-San Antonio
8	Marcus Malone	United States	Utah Flash	Houston
9	Chet Mason	United States	Anaheim Arsenal	Miami (OH)
10	Xavier Whipple	United States	Erie BayHawks	LSU
11	Sean Sonderleiter	United States	Fort Wayne Mad Ants	Iowa
12	Ashanti Cook	United States	Bakersfield Jam	Georgetown
13	Greg Plummer	United States	Sioux Falls Skyforce	Eckerd
14	Ryan Schmidt	United States	Idaho Stampede	Western Oregon
15	Shaun Davis	United States	Colorado 14ers	New Mexico State
16	Andres Sandoval	United States; Dominican Republic	Tulsa 66ers	Dayton
