= Fitzgerald Public Schools =

School district in Michigan

Address
- 23200 Ryan Road Warren, Macomb, Michigan, 48091; United States

District information
- Grades: Pre-Kindergarten-12
- Superintendent: Elizabeth Jensen
- Schools: 6
- Budget: $50,281,000 2022-2023 expenditures
- NCES District ID: 2614460

Students and staff
- Students: 2,307 (2024-2025)
- Teachers: 153.72 (on an FTE basis) (2024-2025)
- Staff: 332.06 FTE (2024-2025)
- Student–teacher ratio: 15.01 (2024-2025)

Other information
- Website: www.fitz.k12.mi.us

Fitzgerald Public Schools is a public school district in Metro Detroit. It is one of the six school districts in Warren, serving the southwest part of the city.

== History ==
The district was originally known as Warren Township School District No. 7.

Fitzgerald High School was built in 1948. The architecture firm was Jensen and Keough of Detroit.

The question of incorporating the area covered by the school district into the city of Fitzgerald was rejected by voters in 1949. In 1953, in an ad for construction bonds, the district stated it "covers 4 1/2 square miles, has a frontage of 2 1/2 miles along the northeastern boundary of the City of Detroit ... Industry constitutes 90% of present valuation and expansion of some of these facilities is in the blueprint stage."

In 2002, an automotive technology facility was built at Fitzgerald High School that allowed students to earn an Automotive Service Excellence certification.

== Schools ==
Schools in Fitzergald Public Schools district
| School | Address | Notes |
|---|---|---|
| Fitzgerald High School | 23200 Ryan Rd, Warren | Grades 9-12. Built 1948. |
| Chatterton Middle School | 24333 Ryan Rd, Warren | Grades 6-8. Built 1969. |
| Mound Park Upper Elementary | 5356 Toepfer, Warren | Grades 4-5. Built 1941. |
| Westview Lower Elementary | 24077 Warner, Warren | Grades 1-3. Built 2007. |
| Schofield Early Childhood Center | 21555 Warner, Warren | Grades PreK-K. Built 1955. |
| Fitzgerald Virtual Academy | 23200 Ryan Rd, Warren | Grades 9-12 |
