= Joe Kopicki =

American basketball player (born 1960)

Personal information
- Born: June 12, 1960 (age 66) Warren, Michigan, U.S.
- Listed height: 6 ft 9 in (2.06 m)
- Listed weight: 240 lb (109 kg)

Career information
- High school: Fitzgerald (Warren, Michigan)
- College: Detroit Mercy (1978–1982)
- NBA draft: 1982: 3rd round, 56th overall pick
- Drafted by: Atlanta Hawks
- Playing career: 1982–1993
- Position: Power forward
- Number: 31, 35

Career history
- 1982–1983: Wisconsin Flyers
- 1982–1984: Washington Bullets
- 1984–1985: Denver Nuggets
- 1985–1986: Benetton Treviso
- 1985–1988: Cajabilbao
- 1988–1991: Pallacanestro Torino
- 1991–1992: Cajabilbao
- 1992–1993: Joventut Badalona
- Stats at NBA.com
- Stats at Basketball Reference

Joseph Gerard Kopicki (born 12 June 1960) is an American former basketball player. At 6 feet 9 inches (2.06 m) and 240 pounds (110 kg), he played the power forward position.

== Biography ==
Kopicki played basketball at Fitzgerald High School in his hometown of Warren, Michigan. He was named to the First Team Class A All-State squad and selected as Macomb County Player of the Year in 1978. During his career at the University of Detroit, Kopicki tallied 1,410 points and 771 rebounds.

Kopicki was drafted in the third round of the 1982 NBA draft (56th pick overall) by the Atlanta Hawks. However, he was waived by the Hawks on October 19. He signed as a free agent with the Indiana Pacers three days later, but was again waived on October 27 before the start of the 1982–83 season. After a season with the Wisconsin Flyers of the CBA, he signed with the Washington Bullets on March 9, 1983, and finally played in the NBA. Kopicki played with the Bullets for the remainder of the 1982–83 and all of the 1983–84 seasons, averaging 3.8 points per game off the bench, but did not make the final roster for the 1984–85 season. He then started negotiations with the Kansas City Kings, but was convinced by the Denver Nuggets to sign on October 31, 1984, just days into the 1984–85 season. Kopicki replaced Russell Cross, who had a weak left knee, on the Nuggets roster. His playing time increased when Bill Hanzlik suffered an injury. After the season, he then decided to play in Europe, where he spent the rest of his career on teams in Italy and Spain. In Europe he was a seven-time All-Star.

Kopicki is now the head coach of the boys' basketball team at his high school alma mater, Fitzgerald.

== Honors ==
Kopicki's number 34 has since been retired by his high school. He was inducted into the Detroit Titans Sports Hall of Fame in 2010. Kopicki received the 2011 Matt Dobek Special Recognition Award from the National Polish-American Sports Hall of Fame.

== Personal ==
Kopicki has been married to his wife Jennifer since 1986. They have raised three children, Jessica, Joseph and Matthew. Kopicki is of Polish descent.

== Career statistics ==
Legend
| GP | Games played | GS | Games started | MPG | Minutes per game |
| FG% | Field goal percentage | 3P% | 3-point field goal percentage | FT% | Free throw percentage |
| RPG | Rebounds per game | APG | Assists per game | SPG | Steals per game |
| BPG | Blocks per game | PPG | Points per game | **Bold** | Career high |

=== NBA ===
==== Regular season ====
| Year | Team | GP | GS | MPG | FG% | 3P% | FT% | RPG | APG | SPG | BPG | PPG |
|---|---|---|---|---|---|---|---|---|---|---|---|---|
| 1982–83 | Washington | 17 | 1 | **11.8** | .451 | .000 | **.840** | **3.6** | .5 | **.5** | **.1** | **3.9** |
| 1983–84 | Washington | **59** | **2** | 11.5 | .485 | .143 | .813 | 2.8 | **.8** | .3 | **.1** | 3.7 |
| 1984–85 | Denver | 42 | 0 | 7.3 | **.526** | **.667** | .796 | 2.0 | .7 | .3 | .0 | 3.5 |
| Career | | 118 | 3 | 10.1 | .493 | .273 | .812 | 2.7 | .7 | .3 | .1 | 3.7 |

==== Playoffs ====
| Year | Team | GP | GS | MPG | FG% | 3P% | FT% | RPG | APG | SPG | BPG | PPG |
|---|---|---|---|---|---|---|---|---|---|---|---|---|
| 1984 | Washington | 3 | | **8.3** | **.500** | – | – | 1.7 | .3 | .0 | .0 | 2.0 |
| 1985 | Denver | **7** | 0 | 4.6 | .375 | – | **.529** | **1.9** | **.4** | **.1** | **.1** | **3.0** |
| Career | | 10 | 0 | 5.7 | .409 | – | .529 | 1.8 | .4 | .1 | .1 | 2.7 |
