= Carlos English =

American professional basketball player

Carlos English is an American professional basketball player who is currently a free agent. He played collegiately with the Cleveland State University Vikings of the Horizon League. English is currently a member of the Harlem Globetrotters and performs under the nickname Dizzy.

== High school and college ==
English attended Fitzgerald High School in Warren, Michigan prior to attending Mott Community College. He was ranked the 6th best point guard in Michigan as a senior. After playing two years at Mott, English received a scholarship to play basketball at Cleveland State University. In his first year with the Vikings (2005–06), English started 24 of 28 games. He was also a starter for his senior year (2006–07).

== Professional career ==
English went undrafted in the 2007 NBA draft. He was drafted in the 10th round of the 2008 NBA Development League Draft by the Dakota Wizards. With the Wizards, he played in 33 games and averaged 1.5 points and 1.4 assists in 7 minutes per game. In 2009, he signed with the Fort Wayne Mad Ants. With Fort Wayne, he averaged 6.7 points and 3.7 assists in 20.1 minutes per game over 9 games. He began the 2010–11 season with the Mad Ants and averaged 4.5 points and 2.6 assists over his first 20 games.
