= Warren Township, Macomb County, Michigan =

Civil township in Michigan, US

Coordinates: 42°29′31″N 83°1′26″W

Warren Township is a former civil township of Macomb County in the U.S. state of Michigan. Most of the township became the city of Warren.

== History ==
The survey township forming the basis of the civil township, Township 1 North, Range 13 East, was initially part of Clinton Township (which was originally known as "Huron Township"). By an act of the Michigan Legislature on March 11, 1835, the townships of Hickory and Orange were set off from Clinton. Hickory then consisted of survey township 1N13E, with the exception of the eastern row of sections, which were made part of Orange Township (later named Erin Township and that later became the cities of East Detroit, Roseville, Fraser, and St. Clair Shores. On April 2, 1838, the township name was changed from Hickory to "Aba" (sometimes misspelled "Alba") and was increased by the additions of sections 1 and 12. On March 26, 1839, the name was changed to "Warren". It was named "Warren" after General Joseph Warren, who died at the Battle of Bunker Hill during the American Revolutionary War.

The community that later became the Village of Warren, began to be settled about 1830, before the formation of Warren Township. It was at first known as "Beebe's Corners" after John L. Beebe, who operated the toll gate on the plank road that led to Detroit. The first landowner known to actually settle in the area is Charles Groesbeck in about 1830. He was soon joined by his brother Louis (the father of Michigan Governor Alex Groesbeck) and Charles Rivard. A strap iron railroad, one of the first of its kind in Michigan, connected the settlement with Utica to the north and with Detroit to the south. The settlement was situated on the line between sections 4 and 5, at the junction of what are now known as Chicago Road and Mound Road.

A part of northern Warren Township incorporated as a village in 1893. The Village of Warren was bound by 14 Mile Road on the north, 13 Mile Road on the south, the Michigan Central Railroad (MCRR) Bay City Branch to the east, and included the eastern half township section 5. In 1920 Warren Township had a population of 3,564. Another settlement grew a few miles to the south of the village of Warren. This settlement incorporated as the village of Center Line in 1925. By 1930, the township's population had risen to 14,269 by 1930. Center Line became a city in 1936 and became independent of Warren Township. Despite this loss of area, Warren Township had a population of 22,126 in 1940. By 1950 Warren Township had a population of 42,653. On October 27, 1956, Governor G. Mennen Williams signed the charter that incorporated the remainder of the township, including the village of Warren, as the city of Warren. The city of Warren began operations on January 1, 1957.

== Communities ==
- Base Line was a one-square mile area along the southern edge of the township. It was named after Base Line Road, an old name for 8 Mile Road. The area was platted in 1860 and received a post office in 1927.
