= Fitzgerald High School (Michigan) =

Location
- 23200 Ryan Road; Warren, Michigan 48091
- Coordinates: 42.4647°N 83.064°W

Information
- Type: Public high school
- Established: 1955
- Principal: Amanda Clor
- Teaching staff: 47.05 (FTE)
- Enrollment: 859 (2023-2024)
- Student to teacher ratio: 18.26
- Colors: Blue and gold
- Mascot: Spartan
- Nickname: Fitz, FHS
- Newspaper: Fitzherald
- Website: www.fitz.k12.mi.us/o/fhs

Fitzgerald Senior High School is a public high school located in Warren, Michigan, United States, in Metro Detroit. The school is part of Fitzgerald Public Schools, and is located at 9 Mile and Ryan. The school colors are blue and gold, and the mascot is the Spartan. Fitzgerald is ranked among the most diverse schools in Michigan.

== History ==
Named after former Michigan governor Frank Fitzgerald, Fitzgerald High opened around the 1920s-1930s as a two-room school (present day Lafayette club, on Ryan south of 10 mile) with over 100 students in 1930. By 1939 there were about 300-400 students, which led to parents and students proposing a new building be built. In 1940 the state accepted the proposal and a new building was built. In the 1940s, population in the area boomed and more people moved to the district, which made the enrollment grow quickly. Enrollment kept growing, and by 1942 it had increased to roughly 840 students.

In 1948 Fitzgerald Junior-Senior High School opened Unit A with nine classrooms, a cafeteria, a library and offices. Mrs. Neigebaur-Perry became the principal as well as superintendent. In 1950 Earl S. Eidt was hired as superintendent and P.D. Chatterton became the Junior-Senior High School's principal. Enrollment reached 1838 by 1951.

Unit B was added to the Junior-Senior High School with 16 classrooms and football and track area. A bond was issued for the building of 50 additional classrooms. By 1955 enrollment had reached 2648. Another large addition to Fitzgerald Junior-Senior High School was opened, including a new library, gym, and cafeteria. In 1957 enrollment was 3414. The new swimming pool opened.

Enrollment hit another new high of 4714 in September 1963, which led to the opening of many schools around the area.

In 1965 enrollment hit 4959 and the D wing was added to the Junior-Senior High School. On January 22, 1967 the auditorium was opened. In 2002 the new Auto Technology and Pre-engineering Center opened. A new Media Center and Communication and performing Arts Center opened at Fitzgerald High School in 2003. In 2004 the athletic fields were updated and the old auto shop demolished to make way for future expansion. In 2005 a new athletic field house was built. The cafeteria and kitchen in the high school were expanded. Janette Brill became the sixth superintendent. In 2006 a second high school gym was added. The pool was renovated. A new lobby entrance and courtyard were built and parking lots restructured. Today the school only has roughly about 1000 students. The football field was again renovated in 2015. The current superintendent is Laurie Fournier.

On September 12, 2018, Danyna Gibson, a student at Fitzgerald, was fatally stabbed by fellow student Tanaya Lewis while both were on Fitzgerald grounds. Gibson was rushed to Ascension Macomb-Oakland Hospital in Warren, but died from her wounds while there. Lewis was taken into custody and was tried for first-degree murder, ultimately receiving 27–60 years in prison, the maximum sentence a juvenile can receive in the state.

== Clubs ==
Fitzgerald has a number of clubs for both parents and students, including a Fitness Club for students and the community, Multi-Cultural Club, S.A.D.D Club, Band Boosters, the Fitz Athletic Association (FAA), a recycling club, Student Council, and National Honors Society (NHS). Fitzgerald also has a new robotics team that competes in games and competitions against neighboring schools. The school also has a S.W.A.G. program that organizes events.

== Band ==
There are three concert bands and a marching band. The Fitzgerald Instrumental Music Program has a long history of success and once received recognition as being one of the top 100 instrumental music programs in the United States. They have also received numerous awards including consistent 1st Division ratings at district and state band festivals, Grammy Enterprise Award, Grammy Signature School Finalist, an Educational Excellence Award from MASSA, and named the National Champion of the NHSBDA online music festival. The marching band has been invited to march in the Detroit Thanksgiving Day Parade, the 2012 Olympic Games and regularly participates in the Grosse Point Santa Parade. These awards and recognition have helped the band travel across the United States to cities such as New York, Boston, Chicago, San Antonio, New Orleans, San Francisco and Nashville. The band has also traveled abroad to Canada and England.

== School songs ==
The music and lyrics for the alma mater "Blue and Gold" and the Fitzgerald Fight Song were composed by director Tauno Luoma. The Fight Song and Alma Mater were later arranged for modern instrumentation by John Smith in the 1990s.

== Sports ==
Sports at Fitzgerald High School include JV and Varsity Football, Sideline Cheer, Boys' Varsity Soccer, Girls' Varsity Swimming, Girls' Varsity Volleyball, JV and Varsity Softball, Girls' Varsity Tennis, Varsity Track, Boys' Varsity Basketball, Girls' Varsity Basketball, Varsity Bowling, Varsity Competitive Cheer, Boys' Varsity Swimming, and Wrestling.

== Notable alumni ==
- Areeya Chumsai (Class of 1989), Miss Thailand 1994
- Carlos English, basketball player for the Harlem Globetrotters
- Joe Kopicki (Class of 1978), NBA player
- Teairra Mari (Class of 2006), singer, actress
- John Wojciechowski (class of 1981), NFL player/NCAA football
