= Center Line High School =

Location
- 26300 Arsenal Street; Center Line, Michigan 48015; United States
- Coordinates: 42°29′12″N 83°01′15″W

Information
- Type: Public high school
- Established: 1955
- School district: Center Line Public Schools
- Principal: John Kelley
- Teaching staff: 40.57 (on an FTE basis)
- Grades: 9-12
- Enrollment: 662 (2023-2024)
- Student to teacher ratio: 16.32
- Campus: Suburban
- Colors: Black; Orange
- Athletics conference: Macomb Area Conference
- Nickname: Panthers
- Rival: Lincoln High School (Warren, Michigan)
- Website: clhs.clps.org

Center Line High School is a public high school located in Center Line, Michigan. It is part of Center Line Public Schools. Center Line High School serves students living in Warren and Center Line, but is open to students living outside of the district through the Michigan School of Choice program. The school colors are orange and black and the mascot is the panther. Center Line High School employs an academy model that exposes students to a multitude of careers, industry skills, and potential employers through classroom instruction, guest speakers, site visits, job shadowing, and internships. Center Line High School offers students AP classes and dual enrollment into the Early College of Macomb program at Macomb Community College, the Macomb Mathematics, Science, and Technology Center program of Warren Consolidated Schools, or the International Academy of Macomb. Center Line High School is a member of the Southwest Macomb Technical Education Consortium (SMTEC) partnership with Fitzgerald High School, Lincoln High School, and Warren Woods Tower High School. Students may opt to take career technical education classes at the SMTEC partner schools and students from the SMTEC partner schools may take career technical education classes at Center Line High School.

== History ==
Center Line High School was founded in 1955 following the conversion of Busch High School to a middle school. The school was a member of the Macomb-Oakland Conference until it disbanded in 1996 and subsequently joined the Macomb Area Conference.

== Academy Model ==
Center Line High School has an educational model consisting of three academies designed according to the National Standards of Practice for Career Academies: Freshman Academy, Health and Human Services Academy, and Industry, Technology, and Innovation Academy. Students enroll in core classes and specialize by taking elective classes within the academy that best suits their career interests. Students may enroll in electives from other academies should they desire. The end state of the academies is that each graduate of Center Line High School finishes with some college credit or an industry-recognized certification.

=== Freshman Academy ===
The Freshman Academy aims to provide a supportive environment for freshman students as they transition from middle school students to high school students. Freshman students are all located within the same wing of the building with classrooms dedicated to core freshman courses. Students receive support from teachers and staff within a small, student-focused learning community. Students within the freshman academy choose to move onto either the Health and Human Services Academy or the Industry, Technology, and Innovation Academy contingent upon their identified strengths and interests.

=== Health and Human Services Academy ===
The mission of the Health and Human Services Academy is to engage all students through service based learning experiences in public safety, medical science and leadership careers. Students choose classes oriented around health and wellness, first responders, law enforcement, or public service.

=== Industry, Technology, and Innovation Academy ===
The mission of the Industry, Technology and Innovation Academy is to engage all students in innovative career-based learning experiences in technology, engineering, business, art and design. Students choose classes oriented around engineering technology, innovative art and design, business, commerce, and entrepreneurship, and digital design and communication.

== Athletics ==
Center Line High School is a member school of the Macomb Area Conference in the Michigan High School Athletic Association. Students may play the following sports:

- Baseball - Boys' Varsity and Junior Varsity
- Basketball - Boys' Varsity, Junior Varsity, and Freshman, Girls' Varsity and Junior Varsity
- Bowling - Boys' Varsity and Junior Varsity, Girls' Varsity and Junior Varsity
- Cheerleading - Non-competitive
- Cross Country - Boys' Varsity and Junior Varsity, Girls' Varsity and Junior Varsity
- Dance - Non-competitive
- Football - Varsity and Junior Varsity
- Soccer - Boys' Varsity and Junior Varsity, Girls' Varsity and Junior Varsity
- Softball - Girls' Varsity and Junior Varsity
- Swimming - Boy's Varsity, Girls' Varsity
- Tennis - Boy's Varsity, Girls' Varsity
- Track and Field - Boys' Varsity and Junior Varsity, Girls' Varsity and Junior Varsity
- Volleyball - Girls' Varsity, Junior Varsity, and Freshman
- Wrestling - Varsity and Junior Varsity

== Army JROTC ==
Center Line High School offers students the opportunity to enroll in the school's Army JROTC Battalion. Its mission is to encourage, prepare, and motivate the young men and women of Center Line to become better citizens and leaders as they take on roles of increased responsibility and accountability. The JROTC Battalion was originally located at Lincoln High School before it was moved to Center Line High School. The JROTC program is also open to students of Lincoln High School, Fitzgerald High School, and Warren Woods Tower High School through the CTE exchange program between the districts.

Cadets enrolled in JROTC learn drill and ceremony, conduct physical training, learn leadership skills, and participate in parades, social events, and community service projects. The battalion offers competitive teams where cadets compete against high schools across the state, the 7th Reserve Officers' Training Corps Brigade, and the country. These teams include the academics team, the color guard, the drill team, the honor guard (armed exhibition drill), the raiders team (military skills), and the rifle team. Cadets enrolled in JROTC do not learn warfighting skills nor are recruited for the military, but the instructors provide guidance and support for cadets that decide to enlist or apply for college ROTC or admission to a service academy.

== Robotics ==
Center Line High School is home of the FIRST Robotics Competition Team 4815, The Electropanthers, as well as serving as an event venue for district competitions. The Electropanthers began their rookie season in 2013 and won the Highest Rookie Seed and Rookie Inspiration Awards at the Detroit FIRST Robotics District Competition hosted at Center Line High School. In 2015, The Electropanthers won the FIRST in Michigan Center Line District Event at Center Line High School. In 2018, The Electropanthers won the Excellence in Engineering Award sponsored by Delphi at the FIRST in Michigan Center Line District Event.

== Trivia ==
The Brown Jug rivalry football game between Center Line High School and Lincoln High School began in 1947 and remains one of the oldest high school football rivalries in the state of Michigan.

While Center Line High School's main rival is Lincoln High School, Center Line High School's in FIRST Robotics is FRC Team 818 representing Warren Consolidated Schools. Center Line High School's rival in JROTC competitions is Wayne Memorial High School.

Eminem mentions performing at talent shows at Center Line High School in his song Yellow Brick Road.

== Notable alumni ==
- Paul Wojno (1974), Michigan State Senator and politician
- Joseph Morrison (2012), suspect in the Gretchen Whitmer kidnapping plot
