= International Academy of Macomb =

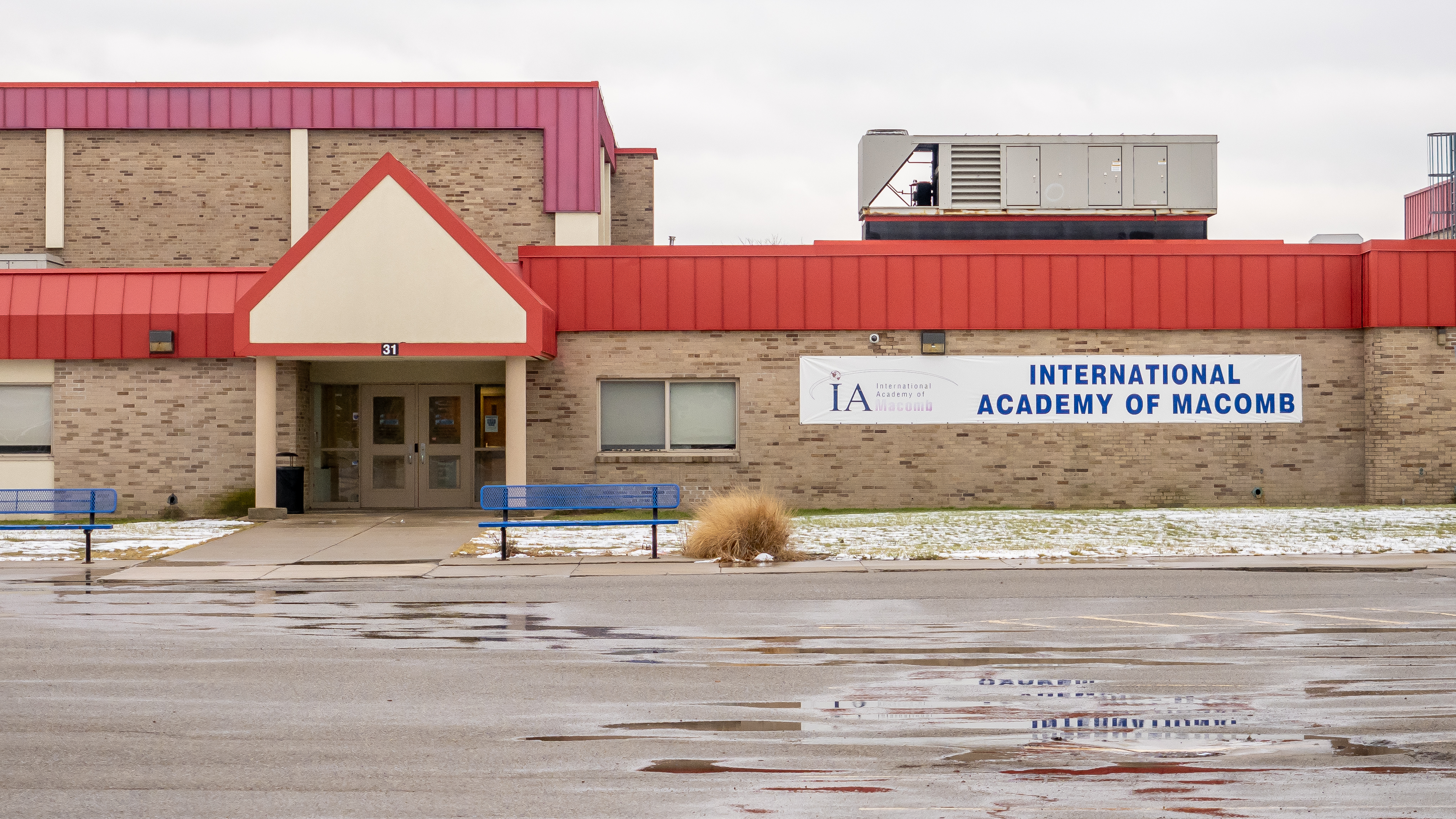

Location
- 42755 Romeo Plank Road; Clinton Township, Michigan; United States; 42.612°N 82.93427°W

Information
- School type: Public, magnet high school
- Established: 2008
- Principal: Laura Strong, Principal
- Grades: 9-12
- Enrollment: 475
- Colors: Navy, Silver
- Mascot: Mighty Oak Tree
- Feeder schools: Anchor Bay, Center Line, Chippewa Valley, Clintondale, East Detroit, Fitzgerald, Fraser, Lake Shore, Lakeview, L'Anse Creuse, New Haven, Richmond, Romeo, South Lake, Van Dyke, Warren Consolidated, Warren Woods
- Website: iamacomb.org

The International Academy of Macomb (IAM/IA) is a public, magnet high school in Macomb County, Michigan located in the Chippewa Valley 9th Grade Center in Clinton Township. The school opened in the spring of 2008 and is an International Baccalaureate school as of early 2010. Although it is an IB school, the IAM is still considered a public school, but it requires students to pass a test and get drawn in a lottery to become enrolled. There is no tuition required for students to attend the IAM.

== Curriculum ==
The first two years at the IAM consist of International Baccalaureate Middle Years Program courses. After these two years, students will begin the International Baccalaureate program, which lasts for two years. All IB students will have to complete 9 'CAS' experiences (creativity, action, service) throughout the two IB years. After four years are completed, students will partake in several IB exams in order to receive their IB diploma.

== Extracurricular activities ==
The IAM's Division I MHSAA sports teams are known as the Lady Leopards. The only sport that the IAM offers currently, as of 2020, is girls Powderpuff (sports) football. The Lady Leopards' slogan is "RKO Utica", in reference to famous wrestler Randy Orton.

In conjoined efforts with the powderpuff football team, the IAM also features an all-male cheerleading team, known for their energetic and elaborate performances featured at halftime.

The IAM also features various clubs. These include Ecology Club, German Club, Dungeons and Dragons Club, Video Game Club, Ski Club, Science Olympiad, Basketball Club, Chess Club, Anime Club, Quiz Bowl, Key Club, French Club, Gay-Straight Alliance, and Spanish Club. Students are allowed to make their own clubs if they cannot find one that is personalized to them.

The IAM's FIRST Robotics Competition Team, Team 4810 I AM Robot, was founded in 2012, and won the Michigan Rookie All-Star Award in 2013, and the Troy District Entrepreneurship award in 2014. In 2018, they won the Creativity in Design Award at their Troy Competition and had the opportunity to compete in the Tesla Division of the FIRST Championship in Detroit.

The IAM is also part of SEMMUNA, MUNNIAC, OUMUN and has a large Model United Nations team. It participates in Tri-M Musical Honor Society, National Honor Society, National Spanish Honors Society, National French Honors Society, National Science Honors Society, Delta Epsilon Phi (German National Honors Society), and National Art Honor Society.

== Awards and honors ==
Student assessments
- 2021-22 school year Change vs. prior year

M-STEP 11th grade proficiency rates (Science / Social Studies)
- Advanced %: 59.0 / 28.0
- Proficient %: 33.0 / 60.0
- PR. Proficient %: ≤5 / 0.0
- Not Proficient %: ≤5 / ≤5

Average test scores
- SAT Total: 1226.4 (▼ −33.4)

The International Academy of Macomb frequently places as one of the best High Schools in the United States and routinely is named in the top three schools in Michigan. As of 2019, it was ranked by U.S. News as the #1 High school in the State of Michigan, the #1 Magnet school in the nation, and the #8 High school in the nation.

== See also ==
- International Academy
