= CLPS =

CLPS may refer to:

- Center Line Public Schools, a public school district in Center Line, Michigan
- Central Lake Public Schools, a public school district in Central Lake, Michigan
- Department of Cognitive, Linguistic, and Psychological Sciences, an academic department at Brown University
- Colipase, a protein co-enzyme secreted by the pancreas
- Commercial Lunar Payload Services, a NASA project to send small payloads to the Moon
- Constituency Labour Party, a local branch of the British Labour Party
