= Karen Randolph =

American academic

Karen A. Randolph is an American academic who studies social work. She is Agnes Flaherty Stoops Professor in Child Welfare at Florida State University.

== Education and career ==
Randolph majored in social work at Central Michigan University, where she graduated in 1977. She earned a master's degree in social work at the University of Michigan in 1979, and became a practitioner in social work in Michigan and Ohio from 1980 to 1994.

Returning to graduate study, she completed a Ph.D. at the University of North Carolina at Chapel Hill in 2000. Her dissertation, High School Graduation among Youth in Poverty, was supervised by Mark W. Fraser, and studied the connections between high school dropouts in the United States and parent employment.

She became an assistant professor at the University at Buffalo in 1999, and moved to Florida State University in 2003.

== Book ==
With Laura L. Myers, another social work academic at Florida A&M University, Randolph is the author of the book Basic Statistics in Multivariate Analysis (Oxford University Press, 2013).

== Recognition ==
At Florida State, Randolph was given the Agnes Flaherty Stoops Professorship in 2009. She was named a Fellow of the Society for Social Work and Research in 2016.
