= St. Clement Church and School =

Former Roman Catholic church and school in Center Line, Michigan

St. Clement Church & School
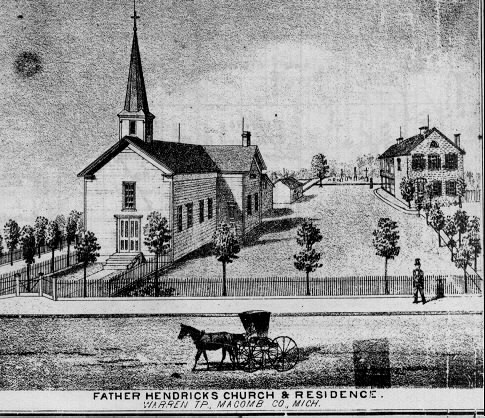
- Sketch of St. Clement Church, 1875
- St. Clement Church & School
- 42°28′49″N 83°1′36″W
- Location: Center Line, Michigan, United States
- Country: United States
- Denomination: Roman Catholic
- Tradition: Latin Church

History
- Status: Former parish
- Founded: 1853
- Dedication: Pope Clement I

Administration
- Archdiocese: Detroit

St. Clement Church & School was a Roman Catholic parish and educational institution located in Center Line, Michigan. Founded in 1853, it was among the oldest religious and educational institutions in Macomb County, Michigan. The parish served the spiritual and academic needs of the community for more than 150 years under the Roman Catholic Archdiocese of Detroit until its merger in 2012.

== History ==
=== Founding and early years ===
St. Clement Parish was established in 1853 to serve Catholic settlers in Warren Township, an area that later became the city of Center Line. Early parishioners were primarily German, French Canadian, Belgian, and Irish immigrants. Before the construction of a permanent church, Mass was celebrated in private homes.

In 1854, a small wooden frame church was erected along what is now Van Dyke Avenue. The parish quickly became a focal point for the growing rural community, providing both religious services and social support.

=== Expansion and development ===
As the congregation expanded, a larger brick church was constructed and dedicated in 1881. For many years, St. Clement served Catholics across a broad region of southeastern Michigan until additional parishes were established.

Throughout the late 19th and early 20th centuries, the parish added facilities including a rectory, convent, and school buildings. In the early 1960s, a new modern church was constructed to accommodate the growing congregation and reflect contemporary architectural and liturgical trends.

=== Merger and consolidation ===
Declining enrollment and parish restructuring within the Roman Catholic Archdiocese of Detroit led to the consolidation of several parishes in the early 21st century. In 2012, St. Clement Parish merged with neighboring congregations to form St. Mary, Our Lady Queen of Families.

== St. Clement School ==
St. Clement School was established in 1857, making it one of the earliest educational institutions in the Center Line area.

Originally a one-room schoolhouse, it expanded over the decades into a full elementary school staffed by religious sisters and lay educators. The school served generations of students from Center Line and surrounding communities, emphasizing academic excellence, Catholic values, and community service.

Due to declining enrollment and financial challenges, the school closed following the 2010–2011 academic year.

== Notable alumni ==
- Joe DeLamielleure – Pro Football Hall of Fame offensive guard who played in the National Football League for the Buffalo Bills and Cleveland Browns.

== Legacy ==
St. Clement Church & School played a foundational role in the development of Center Line. Established in the mid-19th century, it is recognized as the city's oldest religious institution and a central gathering place for early settlers.

The parish served not only as a place of worship but also as a social, cultural, and educational hub for the surrounding community, contributing to the growth of the area.

== See also ==
- Center Line, Michigan
- Roman Catholic Archdiocese of Detroit
- St. Mary, Our Lady Queen of Families
- List of churches in the Roman Catholic Archdiocese of Detroit
