= Center Line, Michigan =

- City
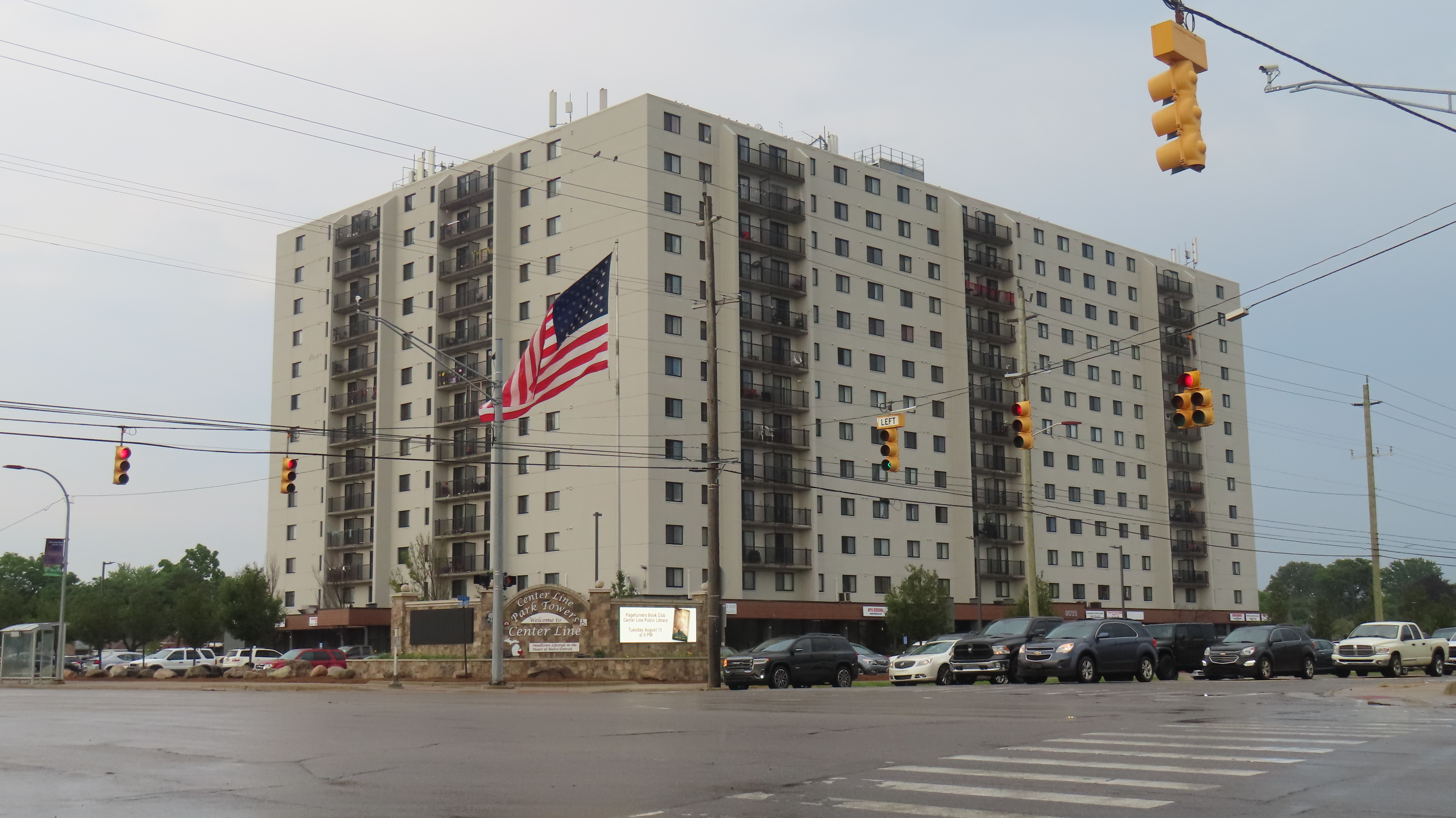
- Center Line Park Towers
- Motto: "Out of the past into the future"
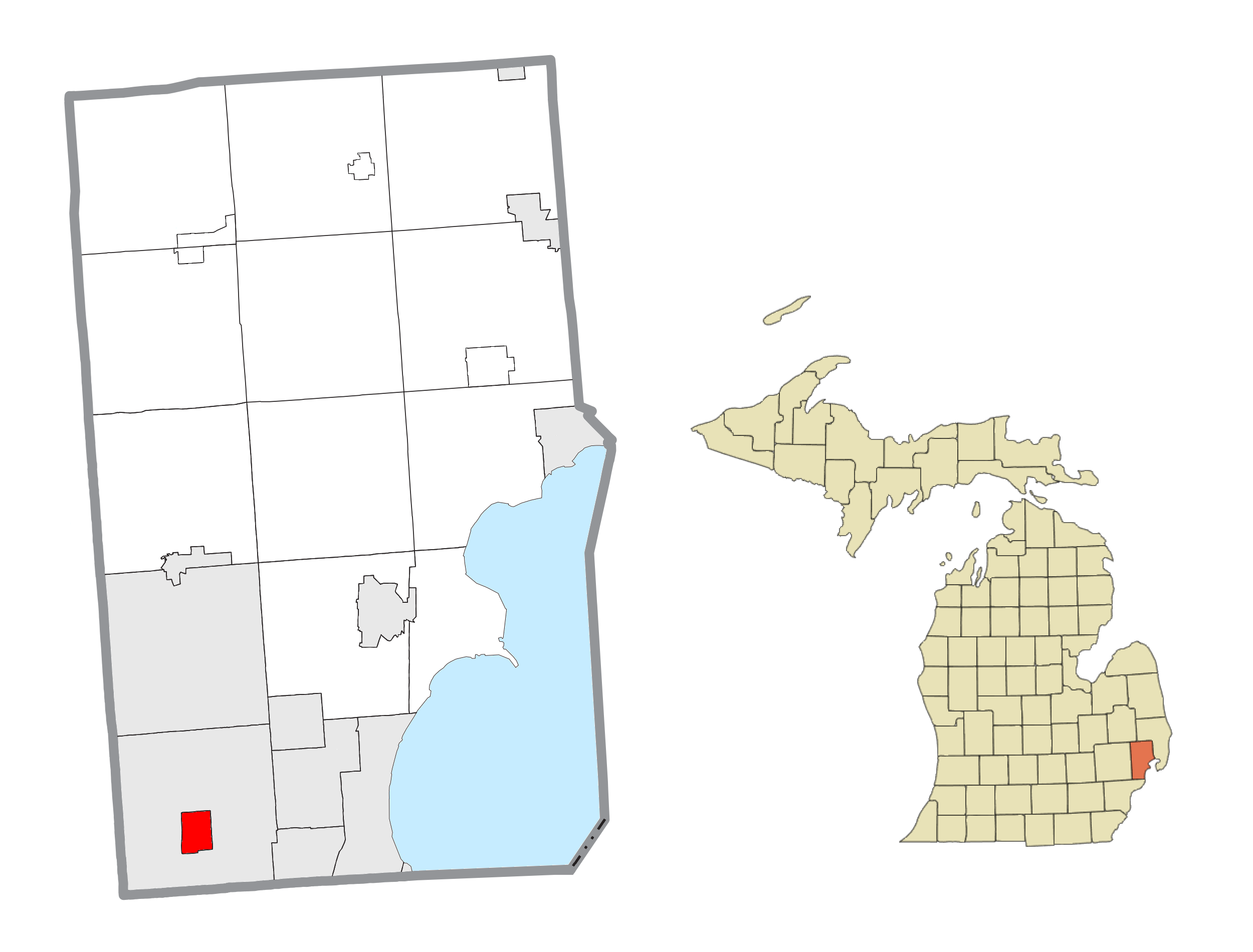
- Location within Macomb County

- Location within Michigan Location within the United States
- Coordinates: 42°28′45″N 83°1′28″W
- Country: United States
- State: Michigan
- County: Macomb
- Settled: 1837
- Incorporated: 1925 (village); 1936 (city)

Government
  - Mayor: Bob Binson

Area
  - Total: 1.75 sq mi (4.54 km^{2})
  - Land: 1.75 sq mi (4.54 km^{2})
  - Water: 0 sq mi (0.00 km^{2})
- Elevation: 620 ft (190 m)

Population (2020)
  - Total: 8,552
  - Estimate (2023): 8,354
  - Density: 4,765.8/sq mi (1,840.09/km^{2})
- Time zone: UTC-5 (Eastern (EST))
  - Summer (DST): UTC-4 (EDT)
- ZIP Code: 48015
- Area code: 586
- FIPS code: 26-14320
- GNIS feature ID: 0622981
- Website: www.centerline.gov

Center Line is a city in Macomb County in the U.S. state of Michigan. An inner-ring suburb of Detroit, Center Line is located roughly 11 miles (17.7 km) north of downtown Detroit, and is entirely surrounded by the larger city of Warren. As of the 2020 census, the city had a population of 8,552.

== History ==
Historically, the land that Center Line came to occupy was swamp and wilderness until the early nineteenth century. As land became scarce, French, German, Belgian, and Irish immigrants began clearing the forests and draining the swamps. Center Line was known as "Kunrod's Corner" during the mid-nineteenth century. The theory is that the French named it "Center Line" because it was the middle of three Potawatomi trails from Fort Detroit to northern trading posts. The "center line" was the trail used from Detroit to Utica. The community received its initial start when Catholics decided to build a church so that they would not have to walk to St. Mary's in Detroit for Sunday Mass. This church (St. Clement's) was established in 1854 and attracted more Catholic settlers into the area. In 1863, the first general store was constructed by Joeseph Buechel. On July 19, 1878, Hieronymous Engelmann was the first postmaster, and he was succeeded in 1885 by Sophia Buechel. The "Centre Line" post office closed on July 31, 1906, and the name was restored to Center Line thereafter. In this era, street car tracks connected Detroit to Center Line along Van Dyke Road, and Ten Mile Road was the final stop of the street car. The village was incorporated in 1925 in the center of Warren Township, which is now the city of Warren, and was incorporated as a city in 1936.

== Geography ==
Center Line is in southwestern Macomb County and is surrounded entirely by the city of Warren. It is 11 miles (18 km) north of downtown Detroit, 7 miles (11 km) west of St. Clair Shores, 6 miles (10 km) east of Royal Oak, and 11 miles (18 km) south of Utica. Interstate 696 runs along the northern edge of Center Line, with access from Exits 22 through 24. Highway M-53 (Van Dyke Avenue) runs north-south through the center of town, connecting Detroit and Utica.

According to the U.S. Census Bureau, the city of Center Line has a total area of 1.75 square miles (4.53 km^{2}), all land.

== Demographics ==
Historical population
Census	Pop.	Note	%±
1930	2,604		—
1940	3,198		22.8%
1950	7,659		139.5%
1960	10,164		32.7%
1970	10,379		2.1%
1980	9,293		−10.5%
1990	9,026		−2.9%
2000	8,531		−5.5%
2010	8,257		−3.2%
2020	8,552		3.6%
2023 (est.)	8,354		−2.3%
U.S. Decennial Census

=== 2020 census ===
As of the 2020 census, Center Line had a population of 8,552. The median age was 41.9 years. 20.5% of residents were under the age of 18 and 18.0% of residents were 65 years of age or older. For every 100 females there were 90.1 males, and for every 100 females age 18 and over there were 86.3 males age 18 and over.

100.0% of residents lived in urban areas, while 0.0% lived in rural areas.

There were 3,784 households in Center Line, of which 26.2% had children under the age of 18 living in them. Of all households, 28.3% were married-couple households, 24.8% were households with a male householder and no spouse or partner present, and 39.6% were households with a female householder and no spouse or partner present. About 40.3% of all households were made up of individuals and 18.4% had someone living alone who was 65 years of age or older.

There were 3,931 housing units, of which 3.7% were vacant. The homeowner vacancy rate was 1.1% and the rental vacancy rate was 3.3%.

Racial composition as of the 2020 census
Race	Number	Percent
White	5,409	63.2%
Black or African American	1,942	22.7%
American Indian and Alaska Native	47	0.5%
Asian	472	5.5%
Native Hawaiian and Other Pacific Islander	4	0.0%
Some other race	102	1.2%
Two or more races	576	6.7%
Hispanic or Latino (of any race)	261	3.1%

=== 2010 census ===
As of the census of 2010, there were 8,257 people, 3,632 households, and 1,988 families residing in the city. The population density was 4,745.4 inhabitants per square mile (1,832.2/km^{2}). There were 3,920 housing units at an average density of 2,252.9 per square mile (869.8/km^{2}). The racial makeup of the city was 82.5% White, 12.0% African American, 0.4% Native American, 2.5% Asian, 0.1% from other races, and 2.5% from two or more races. Hispanic or Latino of any race were 1.7% of the population.

There were 3,632 households, of which 27.7% had children under the age of 18 living with them, 32.0% were married couples living together, 17.5% had a female householder with no husband present, 5.2% had a male householder with no wife present, and 45.3% were non-families. 40.2% of all households were made up of individuals, and 18.1% had someone living alone who was 65 years of age or older. The average household size was 2.22 and the average family size was 3.01.

The median age in the city was 41.2 years. 21.4% of residents were under the age of 18; 8.2% were between the ages of 18 and 24; 25.1% were from 25 to 44; 27.5% were from 45 to 64; and 17.7% were 65 years of age or older. The gender makeup of the city was 46.1% male and 53.9% female.

85.9% of residents 25 or older hold a high school degree. 10.8% of residents 25 or older hold a bachelor's degree or higher. Median household income was $30,752. 21.3% of the population lives below the federal poverty line.

=== 2000 census ===
As of the census of 2000, there were 8,531 people, 3,821 households, and 2,074 families residing in the city. The population density was 4,912.6 inhabitants per square mile (1,896.8/km^{2}). There were 3,916 housing units at an average density of 2,255.0 per square mile (870.7/km^{2}). The racial makeup of the city was 93.82% White, 3.09% African American, 0.25% Native American, 1.01% Asian, 0.26% from other races, and 1.57% from two or more races. Hispanic or Latino of any race were 1.51% of the population.

There were 3,821 households, out of which 24.2% had children under the age of 18 living with them, 36.8% were married couples living together, 13.7% had a female householder with no husband present, and 45.7% were non-families. 40.9% of all households were made up of individuals, and 22.5% had someone living alone who was 65 years of age or older. The average household size was 2.18 and the average family size was 2.99.

In the city, the population was spread out, with 21.8% under the age of 18, 6.9% from 18 to 24, 28.5% from 25 to 44, 20.5% from 45 to 64, and 22.4% who were 65 years of age or older. The median age was 40 years. For every 100 females, there were 81.5 males. For every 100 females age 18 and over, there were 75.5 males.

The median income for a household in the city was $31,677, and the median income for a family was $47,241. Males had a median income of $39,947 versus $26,487 for females. The per capita income for the city was $19,066. About 10.6% of families and 13.3% of the population were below the poverty line, including 17.9% of those under age 18 and 14.4% of those age 65 or over.

== Arts and culture ==
=== Annual events ===
The Center Line Independence Festival is a celebration of the community's ongoing independence from the community that surrounds it (i.e., Warren, MI), and the nation's independence. The event began in 2016, the community's 80th Birthday celebration, and continues as an annual celebration of an incorporated city with live bands, carnival, arts and crafts, children's events and activities, local food vendors and restaurants, beer tent, and its always popular fireworks display.

=== Historical markers ===
Two recognized Michigan historical markers are at:

- St. Clement Catholic Church
- St. Clement Catholic Cemetery

== Politics ==
The mayor of Center Line is Bob Binson.

Center Line is within Michigan's 10th Congressional District and Republican John James is the congressional representative. Center Line is within Michigan's 10th Senate District and Democrat Paul Wojno is the senator. Center Line is within Michigan's 14th House of Representatives District and is represented by Democrat Donavan McKinney.

Center Line voters lean towards the Democratic Party. In the 2014 midterm elections, 63.7% of voters chose Gary Peters (D) over 27.8% for Terri Lynn Land (R). Statewide results were 55% for Peters and 41% for Land. In a closer race, 56.4% chose Mark Schauer (D) over 39.1% for Rick Snyder (R). Statewide results were 47% for Schauer and 51% for Snyder.

== Education ==
Most Center Line residents are zoned to schools in Center Line Public Schools, including Center Line High School. A small portion of the city is in Van Dyke Public Schools, served by Lincoln High School.

St. Clement Catholic School, of the Roman Catholic Archdiocese of Detroit, was in Center Line. It was established in 1857. It had 110 students in the 2009-2010 year, and then 12 teachers and 89 students in its final year, 2010-2011. The parish decided to close the school as a parish takes a greater share of the costs if the number of students is under 100.

The archdiocese operated St. Clement High School in Center Line. It closed in 2005. Macomb Christian Schools (MCS) occupied the old St. Clement High School building from 2017 until 2019, when MCS shutdown.

== Infrastructure ==
=== Main highways ===
- I-696 (Walter P. Reuther Freeway) runs east and west, on the north end of the city.
- M-53 (Van Dyke Avenue) leads northerly into the Van Dyke Freeway and runs north and south, from 9 1/2 Mile Rd. (Stephens) to 11 Mile Rd. (I-696).
- East-west travel is mainly on the mile roads, that is 10 Mile Road which runs through the center of the community, and 11 Mile Road on the north border (Warren). See Mile Road System (Detroit).
