= High school dropouts in the United States =

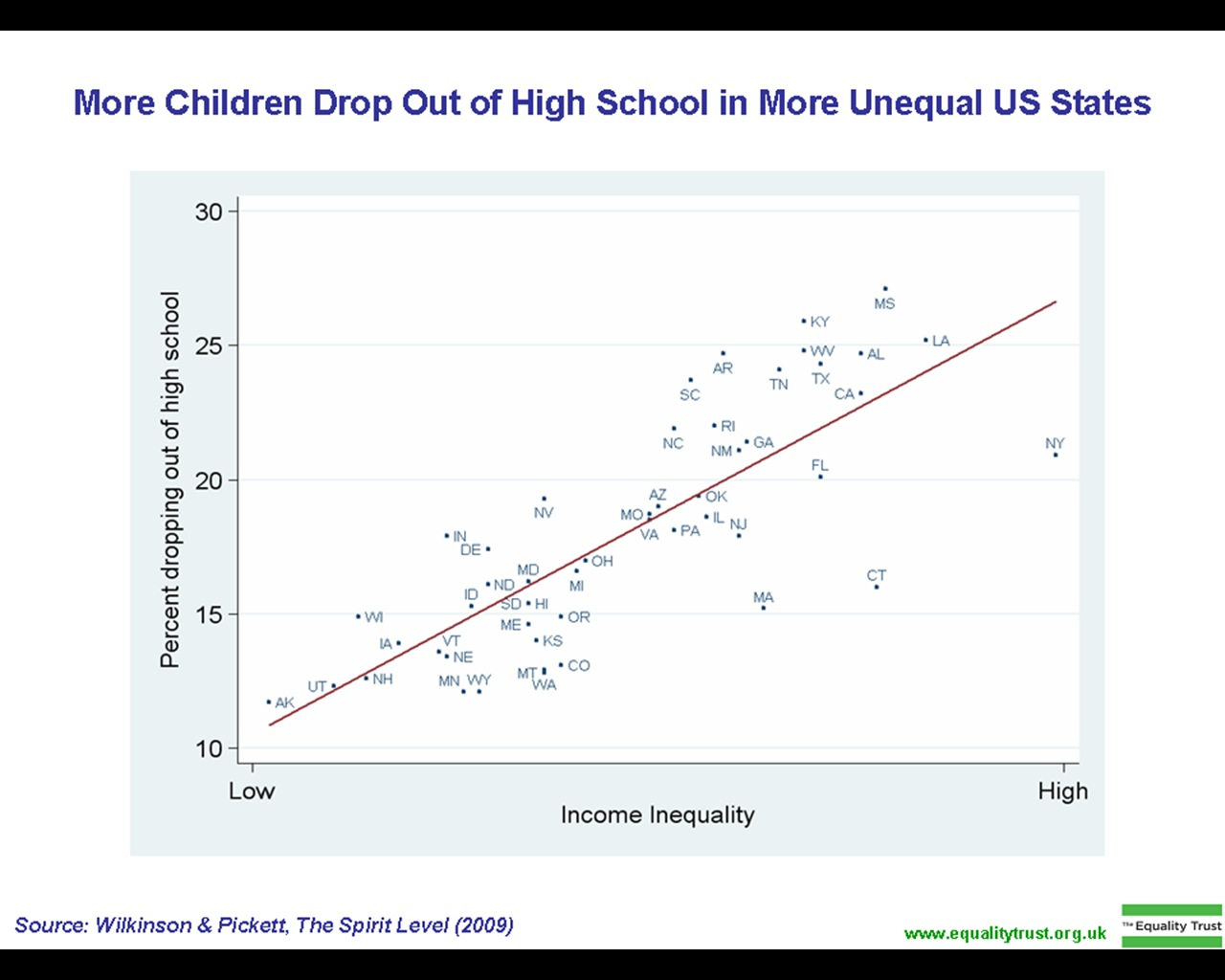
More children drop out of high school in US states with higher economic inequality

The United States Department of Education's measurement of the status dropout rate is the percentage of 16 to 24-year-olds who are not enrolled in school and have not earned a high school credential. This rate is different from the event dropout rate and related measures of the status completion and average freshman completion rates. The status high school dropout rate in 2009 was 8.1%. There are many risk factors for high school dropouts. These can be categorized into social and academic risk factor.

White students and specific members of racial and ethnic minority groups drop out at higher rates than Asian American students, as do those from low-income families, from single-parent households, mentally disabled students, and from families in which one or both parents also did not complete high school. Students at risk for dropout based on academic risk factors are those who often have a history of absenteeism and grade retention, academic trouble, and more general disengagement from school life.

High school dropouts in the United States are more likely to be unemployed, have low-paying jobs, be incarcerated, have children at early ages and/or become single parents. There is not a single race in the U.S. that as of 2019, has a 90 percent graduation rate. In order for the U.S. to have achieved this rate by 2020, almost 200,000 more students would have had to graduate in time.

== Theories ==
=== Academic mediation theory ===
Research has shown that poor academic achievement is one of the strongest predictors of high school dropout. This theory examines the mediation effect of poor academic achievement on other factors, such as deviant affiliation, personal deviance, family socialization and structural strains, associated with school dropout. Essentially, it looks at how poor academic achievement interacts with and affects the relationship between high school dropout and other factors. The model for this theory was shown to statistically fit at an acceptable degree.

=== General deviance theory ===
This theory looks at the relationship between deviant behavior and dropout. Deviant behavior includes delinquency, drug use, and early pregnancy. There is a very strong relationship as general deviance is a strong direct predictor of dropout beyond the effect mediated by poor academic achievement.

=== Deviant affiliation theory ===
The relationship described in this theory is one between an individual bonding with antisocial peers and its effect on dropout rates. Students receive the classification of antisocial if they are likely to drop out themselves and/or have low school attachment. If an individual has antisocial friends, they are much more likely to drop out of school regardless of how well they are doing in school.

=== Poor family socialization theory ===
The institution of family appears to be very formative for a developing child. As such, this theory examines the relationship between family background and dropout rates; it finds the relationship to not be particularly strong, with past academic achievement having much more of an influence than poor family socialization. Factors of poor family socialization include low parental expectations and a parent's lack of education.

=== Structural strains theory ===
This theory focuses on the relationship between demographic factors, such as socioeconomic status, gender and ethnicity, and dropout. Boys are much more likely to drop out than girls and dropouts are most likely from a family with a low socioeconomic status. There has been contention over the influence of ethnicity on dropout rates. However, it is clear that it does have some influence. Low socioeconomic status is a significant predictor of dropout beyond poor academic achievement. Ethnicity and gender had no significance beyond their influence on academic achievement.

== Risk factors ==
=== Social risk factors ===
Social risk factors are demographic variables that are associated with a higher likelihood of school difficulties and, consequently, higher dropout rates. These demographic factors include race/ethnicity, age, language-minority status, gender, family income (socioeconomic status), parents' level of education, and family structure. Research shows that members of racial and ethnic minority groups drop out at higher rates than white students, as do individuals who have low socioeconomic status, come from a single-parent household, or whose parents did not complete high school. In 2010 the dropout rates of 16- to 24-year-olds who are not enrolled in school and have not earned a high school credential were 5.1% for white students, 8.0% for black students, 15.1% for Hispanic students, and 4.2% for Asian students.

=== Academic risk factors ===
Academic risk factors refer to the students' performance in school and are highly related to school level problems. These factors include absenteeism, grade retention, special education placement, low performance and grades, and low educational expectations. Poor academic achievement has a very strong relationship with increased likelihood of dropping out. Grade retention can increase the odds of dropping out by as much as 250 percent above those of similar students who were not retained. Students who drop out typically have a history of absenteeism, grade retention and academic trouble and are more disengaged from school life.

School structure, curriculum and size are factors influential to increased likelihood of a student experiencing academic risk factors. The school curriculum has been found to affect the likelihood of a student to drop out regardless of which courses the individual was taking. Students who attended schools that offered Calculus or fewer courses below the level of Algebra 1 had a reduced risk of dropping out of school by 56%.

School size has a very strong non-linear correlation with dropout rate. A study done by Werblow found that increases in school size can be "associated with a 12% increase in average student dropout rate". However, once a school becomes very large, its size seems to hardly affect dropout rates except for its effect on other factors. Large schools, enrolling between 1,500 and 2,500 students, were found to have the largest proportion of students who dropped out, 12%. Small schools have the lowest dropout rate.

The type or structure of a school was found to be irrelevant in a study done by Lee once other factors, such as demographics and size, were accounted for. The only way school structure affected dropout rates was through teacher-student relationships. Students who attended schools with more positive student-teacher interaction were less likely to drop out. The effect of this relationship was largely determined by the type of school. In small or medium-sized public or Catholic schools, 'positive student-teacher relations led to an 86% decrease in the odds of dropping out". However, student-teacher relations did not significantly affect small or medium private schools.

== Role of relationships ==
As mentioned above, teacher-student interactions can have a large influence on the likelihood of a student dropping out of high school. The better the relationships between students and teachers, the less likely the student is to drop out of school. However, if a teacher identifies a student as on track and having a positive attitude towards school, but does not necessarily have personal interaction with the student, that student has a higher chance of dropping out.

The relationships students have with their peers also play a role in influencing a student's likelihood of dropping out. Building relationships with anti-social peers was found by Battin-Pearson to be a strong and direct predictor of dropout beyond the influence of poor academic achievement. Students who had deviant friends were more likely to drop out of school early regardless of their achievement in school.

Parent-child relationships have also been found to be very influential in whether or not a student decides to stay in school. The better the relationship, as demonstrated through positive interaction and parental involvement, the more likely the student will stay in school. If a student does not have a good relationship with his/her parents, the student is more likely to drop out even if he has good grades and good behavior. This demonstrates that parental support is crucial, as students with good grades and behavior are typically more likely to stay in school. However, parental expectations or degree of education are not as influential. A study by Battin-Pearson found that these two factors did not contribute significantly to dropout beyond what was explained by poor academic achievement.

== Motivation for dropping out ==
While the above factors certainly place a student at risk for dropout, they are not always the reason the student identifies as their motivation for dropping out. However, there is not a large body of research describing the students' personal motivation. One study found that the main reasons students reported for dropping out included uninteresting classes (a lack of engagement with school life and classes), unmotivated (students typically said teachers demanded too much or were not inspirational), personal reasons (had to get a job, became a parent, had to support or care for a family member), and academic challenges (felt like they could not keep up, felt unprepared for high school, had to repeat a grade, or graduation requirements seemed out of reach).

Another motivation for students to dropout of school comes from schools practicing zero tolerance policies. Zero tolerance policies require school officials to give out harsh and consistent punishments for misbehavior, regardless of the students’ background or circumstances. The Zero Tolerance Task Force was commissioned by the American Psychological Association (APA) to thoroughly examine evidence regarding the academics and behavioral outcomes from the use of zero tolerance policies. The task force concluded with recommendations for phasing out zero tolerance policies and implementing more positive alternatives. In a wide lens view of constant use of zero tolerance policies, the rising number of students who have been suspended and expelled correlates to an increased trend of school dropout and lack of students graduating on-time.

These policies also contribute to the school-to-prison pipeline. The school-to-prison pipeline displays students who have been pushed out of their schools and into the criminal justice system. Once students are forced out of school, they may seek alternatives for a sense of acceptance - which may come from negative experiences. A prime example of this is the impact of zero tolerance policies on students of color. A major concern is the use of unreasonable discipline for these students, especially African Americans. Evidence has shown that the inconsistency in discipline does not directly stem from an economic disadvantage or Black students demonstrating significantly higher rates of violence or disorder. Research continues to document that Black students are often disciplined more harshly for minor and subjective reasons relative to their peers. From the growing research literature, this inordinate discipline of Black students may stem from a lack of teacher training in class management and preparation of culturally competent practices. The students' feeling of security from other outside forces may lead to their loss of trust in the school system and ultimately dropping out.

Early parenthood and pregnancy is a motivation to dropout. An article stated that early parenthood was the number one cause for school dropout in teen girls, as thirty percent of teen girls said pregnancy was the reason why they dropped out.

In some cases, social reasons such as bullying, harassment, or an inability to fit into the school community for reasons outside of their control are reasons.

== The effect of standardized tests ==
The No Child Left Behind Act implemented a "standardized, high-stakes, test-based accountability system". The purpose was to increase accountability of schools for measured improvements of students' knowledge. In order to accomplish this, test scores were disaggregated into subgroups to better evaluate if the historically under-served minorities were receiving a good education. Under this system, a school cannot receive a high rating if the scores of the subgroups do not improve. Based on a study done by researchers from Rice University and University of Texas at Austin, the policy inadvertently encourages students to drop out of high school. Teachers and administrators utilize grade retention as a strategy to improve test scores and ensure positive ratings.

== Consequences ==
=== Individual ===
High school dropouts are less likely to be active labor force participants and are more likely to be unemployed than their more educated counterparts. The current unemployment rate for high school dropouts is about 56 percent greater than that for high school completers. Lifetime earnings for this group are estimated to be $260,000 less than those for high school graduates. Female dropouts are much more likely to become single mothers and consequently be more likely to have an income under the poverty threshold or live on welfare. High school dropouts make up 68 percent of the nation's prison population. Nearly 37% of dropouts live in poor/near poor families. Additionally, high school dropouts have a life expectancy that is 3–5 years shorter than high school graduates.

Graduating students from high school who are not prepared for college, however, also generates problems, as the college dropout rate exceeds the high school rate. To pursue their studies, students unprepared for college may accumulate a large amount of debt, which must be paid back regardless.

=== Societal ===
The problems created at an individual level due to the lack of a high school diploma or GED affect society as a whole. Those who cannot find jobs cannot pay taxes, resulting in a loss of revenue for the government. For each cohort of 18-year-olds who never complete high school, the US loses $192 billion in income and tax revenue. Moretti estimates that by increasing the high school completion rate of males by one percent, the US could save up to $1.4 billion annually in reduced costs from crime. A substantial amount of taxpayer money goes toward maintaining the prisons. And, in 2004, each high school dropout was responsible for nearly $100,000 in health-related losses. Because of these factors, an average high school dropout will cost the government over $292,000.

== Measurement of the dropout rate ==
The U.S. Department of Education identifies four different rates to measure high school dropout and completion in the United States. Each rate contributes unique information.

- The event dropout rate estimates the percentage of high school students who left high school between the beginning of one school year and the beginning of the next without earning a high school diploma or its equivalent (e.g., a GED). Event rates can be used to track annual changes in the dropout behavior of students in the U.S. school system.
- The status dropout rate reports the percentage of individuals in a given age range who are not in school and have not earned a high school diploma or equivalent credential. This rate focuses on an overall age group as opposed to individuals in the U.S. school system, so it can be used to study general population issues.
- The status completion rate indicates the percentage of individuals in a given age range who are not in high school and who have earned a high school diploma or equivalent credential, irrespective of when the credential was earned. The rate focuses on an overall age group as opposed to individuals in the U.S. school system, so it can be used to study general population issues.
- The averaged freshman graduation rate estimates the proportion of public high school freshmen who graduate with a regular diploma four years after starting ninth grade. The rate focuses on public high school students as opposed to all high school students or the general population and is designed to provide an estimate of on-time graduation from high school. Thus, it provides a measure of the extent to which public high schools are graduating students within the expected period of four years.

== Notable dropouts ==
- Don Adams (1923–2005), actor; dropped out of DeWitt Clinton High School
- Eminem (born 1972), rapper; dropped out of Lincoln High School
- Jay-Z (born 1969), rapper/entrepreneur; dropped out of Trenton Central High School
- Vincent Palermo (born 1944) mobster; dropped out of school in Brooklyn, New York
- Tim Pool (born 1986) Podcaster; dropped out at 14
- Tiffany Young (born 1989), singer; dropped out of Diamond Bar High School at age 15 to pursue music in South Korea

== See also ==
- Racial achievement gap in the United States § High school
