= List of churches in the Archdiocese of Detroit =

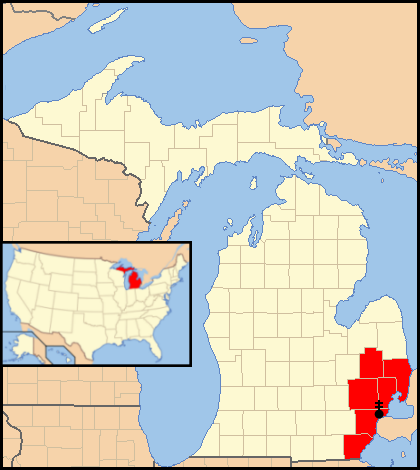
Archdiocese of Detroit in red

This is a list of current and former Roman Catholic churches in the Roman Catholic Archdiocese of Detroit. The archdiocese is divided into four administrative regions:

- Central (including the cities of Detroit and Hamtramck)
- Northeast (including Macomb and St. Clair Counties)
- Northwest (including Oakand and Lapeer Counties)
- South (including Monroe County and southern and western Wayne County)

In 2021, the archdiocese started reorganizing the parishes in each region into families, each consisting of two or more parishes.

== Central Region ==
The Central Region of the archdiocese contains ten families of parishes, all located in Detroit or Hamtramck.

=== D4 Mission Family of Parishes ===
The parishes in this family are in Detroit.

Name	Image	Year	Location	Notes
Christ the King		1962	20800 Grand River Ave., Detroit	Parish founded in 1927.
St. Charles Lwanga			10400 Stoepel St., Detroit	
St. Moses the Black Parish			1125 Oakman Blvd. Detroit	
St. Peter Claver			13305 Grove St, Detroit	Chapel ceiling collapsed in 2018
St. Suzanne - Our Lady Gate of Heaven		1962	19321 W. Chicago Ave., Detroit	St. Suzanne parish was founded in 1946. Our Lady Gate of Heaven was merged into the parish in 2002.

=== Detroit Lower Eastside Family of Parishes ===
This family includes parishes in Detroit.

Name	Image	Year	Location	Style	Architect	Notes
Nativity of Our Lord			5900 McClellan Ave., Detroit			
Sacred Heart			1000 Eliot St., Detroit			
St. Augustine and St. Monica			4151 Seminole St.,Detroit			
St. Charles Borromeo		1918	1491 Baldwin St., Detroit			Parish founded in 1886.
St. Elizabeth		1892	3138 E Canfield St., Detroit			Parish founded in 1884.

=== Genesis Vicariate Family 1 ===
This family includes parishes in Detroit and Hamtramck.

Name	Image	Year	Location	Style	Architect	Notes
Mother of Divine Mercy Parish		1900	St. Josaphat Church, 715 E. Canfield St, Detroit,			Parish founded in 1889
		1901	Sweetest Heart of Mary Church, 4440 Russell St., Detroit			Parish founded in 1889.
Our Lady Queen of Apostles			3851 Prescott St, Hamtramck,			Parish founded in 1917
St. Florian Parish		1909	2626 Poland St. Hamtramck,			Parish founded in 1907
St. Hyacinth			3151 Farnsworth St., Detroit			
St. John Paul II			5830 Simon St, Detroit			

=== Ignatian Family of Parishes ===
This family includes parishes in Detroit.

Name	Image	Year	Location	Style	Architect	Notes
Gesu			17180 Oak Dr., Detroit			Parish founded in 1922.
Sts. Peter and Paul		1959	7685 Grandville Ave, Detroit			Parish founded in 1923, serving workers at Ford's new River Rouge Plant, many of whom were Polish immigrants

=== One in the Spirit Family of Parishes ===
This family includes parishes in Detroit.

Name	Image	Year	Location	Notes
Corpus Christi			19800 Pembroke Ave, Detroit	
Presentation - Our Lady of Victory			8201 W. Outer Dr., Detroit	Parish founded in 1943.
St. Juan Diego			7800 Woodmont Ave., Detroit 5780 Evergreen Ave, Detroit	Parish was merger of St. Christopher and St. Thomas Aquinas Parishes.
St. Mary of Redford		1860	14750 Saint Mary's St., Detroit	Parish founded in 1843.
Sts. Peter and Paul		1959	7685 Grandville Ave, Detroit	Parish founded in 1923, serving workers at Ford's new River Rouge Plant, many of whom were Polish immigrants
St. Scholastica			8201 W. Outer Dr, Detroit	

=== Renaissance Vicariate Family 3 ===
This family includes parishes in Detroit.

Name	Image	Year	Location	Style	Architect	Notes
Assumption of the Blessed Virgin Mary			13770 Gratiot Ave., Detroit			
Holy Family Parish			641 Chrysler Dr., Detroit			Parish founded in 1909
St. Joseph Shrine and Parish		1873	1828 Jay St., Detroit			

=== Resurget Cineribus Family of Parishes ===
This family includes parishes in Detroit.

Name	Image	Year	Location	Style	Architect	Notes
Cathedral of the Most Blessed Sacrament			9844 Woodward Ave., Detroit			Parish established in 1905.
Old St. Mary's		1884	646 Monroe Ave., Detroit			Parish founded in 1834.
St. Aloysius			1234 Washington Blvd., Detroit			Parish founded in 1871

=== SOLT Family of Parishes ===
The families in this parish are in Detroit.

Name	Image	Year	Location	Style	Architect	Notes
Most Holy Redeemer Church		1922	1721 Junction St., Detroit 42°19′2″N 83°6′7″W	Late 19th and 20th Century Revivals, Late Victorian, Romanesque	Donaldson and Meier	Parish was established in 1880. Present church was dedicated April 1, 1923. Part of the West Vernor-Junction Historic District listed on the National Register of Historic Places and as a Michigan Historic Site.
St. Cunegunda			1721 Junction St, Detroit			
St. Gabriel (Mexican)		1916	8118 W. Vernor Hwy. Detroit			

=== Southwest Detroit Family of Parishes ===
This family includes parishes in Detroit.

y	Image	Year	Location	Style	Architect	Notes
Basilica of Sainte Anne de Détroit		1886	1000 Ste. Anne Street, Detroit 42°19′14.83″N 83°4′16.16″W	Classical Revival, Late Gothic Revival	Leon Coquard	Parish founded in 1701. Elevated to minor basilica in 2020. Listed on the National Register of Historic Places and as a Michigan Historic Site.
Holy Cross (Hungarian)		1925	8423 South St., Detroit	Neo-Gothic	Henry Kohner	
Most Holy Trinity Church		1855	1050 Porter St., Detroit	Gothic Revival	Patrick C. Keely	Detroit's second oldest parish, founded in 1834. Church has stained glass windows created by Ignace Schott and Friedrichs & Staffin
Our Lady of Guadalupe			4329 Central Ave, Detroit			
St. Francis D'Assisi - St. Hedwig		1889 and 1903	4500 Wesson St., Detroit 3245 Junction St., Detroit			Parish founded in 2013 from St. Francis Parish (founded in 1889) and St. Hedwig Parish (founded in 1903)

=== Trinity Family of Parishes of Northeast Detroit ===
This family includes parishes in Detroit.

Name	Image	Year	Location	Style	Architect	Notes
Our Lady Queen of Heaven / Good Shepherd			8200 Rolyat St., Detroit			Our Lady Queen of Heaven Parish was founded in 1929
St. Jude		1956	15889 E. Seven Mile, Detroit			Parish founded in 1941
St. Raymond / Our Lady of Good Counsel			20103 Joann Ave., Detroit			

== Northeast Region ==
The Northeast Region of the archdiocese has 13 families of parishes.

=== Blue Water Northern Family of Parishes ===
This family contains parishes in Marysville, Lakeport and Port Huron.

	Image	Year	Location	Notes
Holy Trinity Parish
St. Joseph Church		1922	, 1331 7th St., Port Huron	Combined into Holy Trinity parish.
St. Stephen Church	St. Stephen-Port Huron		325 32nd St., Port Huron	Combined into Holy Trinity parish.
St. Christopher	St. Christopher-Marysville	1980s	1000 Michigan Ave, Marysville	Parish founded in 1936;
St. Edward on the Lake	St. Edward on the Lake-Lakeport	1956	6945 Lakeshore Rd., Lakeport	
St. Mary	St. Mary-Port Huron		1505 Ballentine St, Port Huron	

=== Blue Water Southern Family of Parishes ===
This family contains parishes in Ira Township, St. Clair, New Baltimore and Marine City.

Name	Image	Year	Location	Notes
Immaculate Conception		1918	9764 Dixie Hwy, Ira Township	Parish founded in 1853; original church destroyed by fire 1917
Our Lady on the River Parish		1903	Holy Cross Church, 610 South Water St,, Marine City	Merged to form Our Lady on the River Parish.
			St. Catherine of Alexandria Church, 1103 Washington St,, Algonac	Merged to form Our Lady on the River Parish.
St. Mary's		1865 1886	415 N. Sixth St., St. Clair	Designated as Michigan Historical Marker L1270A
St. Mary Queen of Creation		1962	50931 Maria St., New Baltimore	Parish founded in 1875; original 83-year-old church building destroyed by fire in 1958
			St. Mark Church, Harsens Island	Merged to form Our Lady on the River Parish.

=== Central Macomb Vicariate Family 1 ===
This parish contains families in Clinton Township, Harrison Township and Mount Clemens.

	Image	Year	Location	Notes
San Francesco			22870 S. Nunneley Rd., Clinton Township	Personal parish designed for Italians.
St. Hubert			38775 Prentiss St, Harrison Township	
St. Louis		1958	24415 Crocker Blvd, Clinton Township	Parish founded in 1926
St. Peter		1960	95 Market St, Mount Clemens	Modern English Gothic church with pointed arches, large windows and flying buttresses.

=== Central Macomb Vicariate Family 3 ===
This family contains parishes in Warren.

Name	Image	Year	Location	Notes
Our Lady of Grace (Vietnamese)			26256 Ryan Rd, Warren	
St. Anne		1964	32000 Mound Rd., Warren	Early Italian Renaissance style church designed by Charles M. Valentine and Associates; parish founded in 1946, originally covered 20 square miles
St. Faustina			14025 Twelve Mile Rd., Warren	
St. Louise de Marillac			2500 Twelve Mile Rd., Warren	
St. Mark			4401 Bart Ave, Warren	
St. Mary, Our Lady Queen of Families			12253 Frazho Rd, Warren	

=== Central Macomb Vicariate Family 5 ===
This family contains parishes in Sterling Heights and Clinton Township.

Name	Image	Year	Location	Notes
St. Malachy			14115 E 14 Mile Rd, Sterling Heights	Parish founded in 1947.
St. Paul of Tarsus			41300 Romeo Plank Rd, Clinton Township	
St. Ronald			17701 15 Mile Rd, Clinton Township	
St. Thecla			20740 S. Nunneley Rd, Clinton Township	

=== Disciples Unleashed Family of Parishes ===
This family contains parishes in Macomb, Ray Township and Shelby Township.

Name	Image	Year	Location	Notes
St. Francis St. Maximilian Kolbe			62811 New Haven Rd., Ray Township	
St. Isidore			18201 23 Mile Rd, Macomb	
St. Therese of Lisieux			48115 Schoenherr Rd, Shelby Township	.

=== Family of the Good Shepherd ===
This family contains parishes in Sterling Heights.

Name	Image	Year	Location	Notes
Our Lady of Czestochowa (Polish)			3100 18 Mile Rd., Sterling Heights	
Ss. Cyril and Methodius		1988	41233 Ryan Rd., Sterling Heights	Parish founded in 1918, serving the Slovak community, originally in Detroit; Sterling Heights church opened in 1988
St. Jane Frances de Chantal		1980	38750 Ryan Rd, Sterling Heights	Parish founded in 1977.
St. Rene Goupil			35955 Ryan Rd, Sterling Heights	

=== Gaudium et Spes, Joy and Hope Family of Parishes ===
This family contains parishes in Roseville and St. Clair Shores

Name	Image	Year	Location	Notes
Holy Innocents and Saint Barnabas			16359 Frazho Rd., Roseville	
Our Lady of Hope			28301 Little Mack Ave., Roseville	Parish formed in 2007 with the merger of St. Germaine and St. Gertrude Parishes
St. Isaac Jogues			21100 Madison St., St. Clair Shores	
St. Margaret of Scotland			21201 E. 13 Mile Rd., St Clair Shores	
St. Pio of Pietrelcina			18720 13 Mile Rd, Roseville	

=== Merciful Love of Jesus Family of Parishes ===
This family contains parishes in Memphis, Richmond and Armada.

Name	Image	Year	Location	Notes
Holy Family			79780 Main St, Memphis	Clustered community sharing resources with St. Augustine in Richmond
St. Augustine		1912	68035 S. Main St., Richmond	Established as a mission church in 1880; church built in 1912 using stones gathered from fields on congregants
St. Mary Mystical Rose		1948	24040 Armada Ridge Rd., Armada	

=== Northwest Macomb Family of Parishes ===
This family contains parishes in Washington, Romeo and Shelby Township in Macomb County.

Name	Image	Year	Location	Style	Architect	Notes
SS. John and Paul		1984	7777 28 Mile Rd., Washington			Parish founded in 1980.
St. Clement of Rome		1968	343 S. Main Street, Romeo			Parish founded in 1921
St. John Vianney			54045 Schoenherr Rd., Shelby Township			

=== Saints Among the Saints Family of Parishes ===
This family contains parishes in Sterling Heights and Warren.

Name	Image	Year	Location	Notes
St. Blase		1976	12151 15 Mile Rd, Sterling Heights	Parish established in 1967
St. Ephrem			38900 Dodge Park Rd, Sterling Heights	Parish formed in 1964
St. Martin de Porres			31555 Hoover Rd., Warren	
St. Michael			40501 Hayes Rd, Sterling Heights	

=== Saints of the Lake Family Parishes ===
This family contains parishes in Grosse Pointe Park, Gross Pointe Farms and Detroit.

Name	Image	Year	Location	Notes
St. Ambrose		1927	15020 Hampton Rd., Grosse Pointe Park	Norman Gothic church designed by Donaldson and Meier. Parish established in 1916
St. Clare of Montefalco		1953	1401 Whittier Rd., Grosse Pointe Park	Parish founded in 1923.
St. Matthew		1955	6021 Whittier Ave., Detroit	Parish founded in 1926
St Paul on the Lake		1899	157 Lake Shore Rd., Grosse Pointe Farms 42°23′41″N 82°53′37″W	French Gothic church designed by Harry J. Rill. Listed on the National Register of Historic Places and as a Michigan Historic Site.

=== SERF Vicariate Family 2 ===
This family contains parishes in Grosse Pointe Woods, Eastpointe and St. Clair Shores.

Name	Image	Year	Location	Notes
Our Lady Star of the Sea		1999	467 Fairford Rd., Grosse Pointe Woods	Parish founded in 1954
St. Basil the Great			22851 Lexington Ave., Eastpointe	
St. Joan of Arc			22412 Overlake St., St. Clair Shores	
St. Lucy			23401 E. Jefferson St., St. Clair Shores	
St. Veronica			21440 Universal Ave., Eastpointe	Altar includes relics from six saints

== Northwest Region ==
e Northwest Region of the archdiocese has 14 families of parishes.

=== East Thumb Catholic Family of Parishes ===
This family includes parishes in Emmett, Yale and Allenton

Name	Image	Year	Location	Notes
Our Lady of Mount Carmel	Our Lady of Mt. Carmel-Emmett		10828 Brandon Rd.,Emmett	
Sacred Heart	Sacred Heart-Yale		310 N. Main St, Yale	
St. John the Evangelist	St. John the Evangilist-Allenton		883 Capac Rd., Allenton	

=== Emmaus Family of Parishes ===
This family includes parishes in Troy and Clawson,

Name	Image	Year	Location	Notes
Christ Our Light			3077 Glouchester Dr, Troy	
Guardian Angels			581 E. 14 Mile Rd., Clawson	Parish founded in 1920 as a mission church of Holy Name Parish in Birmingham; became an independent parish in 1923
St. Anastasia			4571 John R Rd., Troy	
St. Elizabeth Ann Seton			280 E. Square Lake Rd., Troy	
St. Lucy Croatian			200 E. Wattles Rd., Troy	

=== Family Sent on Mission ===
This family includes parishes in Southfield, Berkley and Oak Park.

Name	Image	Year	Location	Notes
Divine Providence Lithuanian		1973	25335 W Nine Mile Rd., Southfield	Parish traces its history to Detroit's first Lithuanian church in 1908. The original church was demolished in 1966. Southfield church was dedicated in 1973.
Our Lady of La Salette		1967	2600 Harvard Rd., Berkley	Parish founded in 1921. Original church located at 1799 Coolidge Hwy.
Our Mother of Perpetual Help		1962	13500 Oak Park Blvd, Oak Park	Parish was founded in 2014 with the merger of Our Lady of Fatima and St. James Parishes
Transfiguration			25225 Code Rd.., Southfield	Parish was founded in 2007 with the merger of St. Beatrice, St. Bede, St. Ives, and St. Michael Parishes. It uses the St. Michael's Church; St. Michael's was founded as a parish in 1930

=== Northern Lapeer County Family of Parishes ===
This family includes parishes in Brown City, North Branch and Clifford.

Name	Image	Year	Location	Notes
Sacred Heart Mission	Sacred Heart Mission-Brown City		7090 Cade Rd., Brown City	
St. Mary Burnside			6645 Washington St,, North Branch	
St. Patrick Chapel	St. Patrick Chapel-Clifford		9851 Main Street, Clifford	
Ss. Peter and Paul	Ss. Peter and Paul-North Branch	1979	6645 Washington, North Branch	

=== Northwest Oakland Lakes Vicariate Family of Parishes ===
This family includes parishes in Waterford, Ortonville, Clarkson and Holly.

Name	Image	Year	Location	Notes
Our Lady of the Lakes			5481 Dixie Hwy, Waterford.	
St. Anne		1990	825 S. Ortonville Rd., Ortonville	Parish founded in 1947
St. Daniel			7010 Valley Park Dr., Clarkston	
St. Rita			309 E. Maple St., Holly	Parish founded in 1925

=== Paint Creek Catholic Family of Parishes ===
This family includes parishes in Lake Orion and Auburn Hills.

s	Image	Year	Location	Notes
Christ the Redeemer			2700 Waldon Rd., Lake Orion	
St. John Fisher Chapel			3665 E. Walton Blvd, Auburn Hills	
St. Joseph			715 N. Lapeer Rd., Lake Orion	

=== Rochester Area Catholic Family of Parishes ===
This family includes parishes in Rochester and Rochester Hills.

Name	Image	Year	Location	Notes
St. Andrew			1400 Inglewood Ave, Rochester	
St. Irenaeus			771 Old Perch Rd., Rochester Hills	
St. Mary of the Hills			2675 John Rd., Rochester Hills	

=== South Oakland Vicariate Family 3 ===
This family includes parishes in Auburn Hills, Waterford, Pontiac, Bloomfield Hills and Troy.

oo	Image	Year	Location	Notes
Sacred Heart			3400 S. Adams Rd., Auburn Hills	
St. Benedict			80 S. Lynn St, Waterford.	
St. Michael the Archangel (St. Damien of Molokai Parish)		1953	120 Lewis St, Pontiac	
St. Vincent de Paul (St. Damien of Molokai Parish)			46408 Woodward Ave., Pontiac	
St. Hugo of the Hills		1931	2215 Opdyke Rd., Bloomfield Hills	Norman Gothic church built using Lannon stone, as a tribute to Hugo MacManus. Was designed by Artur Des Rossiers, Harley Ellington Pierce Yee & Associates
St. Thomas More			4580 Adams Rd., Troy	

=== South Oakland Vicariate Family 4 ===
This family includes parishes in Royal Oak, Farmington, Hazel Park and Madison Heights.

Name	Image	Year	Location	Notes
National Shrine of the Little Flower Basilica		1936	1200 W. Twelve Mile Rd., Royal Oak 42°30′14″N 83°9′26″W	Art Deco church constructed by Reverend Charles Coughlin and designed by Henry J. McGill. It was declared a national shrine in 1998 and a minor basilica in 2015.
St. Justin - St. Mary Magdalen			1600 E. Evelyn Ave, Hazel Park	
St. Mary of Royal Oak		1954	730 S. Lafayette Ave, Royal Oak	
St. Vincent Ferrer		1958	28353 Herbert St, Madison Heights	

=== South Oakland Vicariate Family 6 ===
This family contains parishes in Southfield and Rochester Hills.

Name	Image	Year	Location	Notes
Our Lady of Albanians			29350 Lahser Rd, Southfield,	
St. Paul Albanian			525 W Auburn Rd., Rochester Hills	

=== South Oakland Vicariate Family 7 ===
This family includes parishes in Orchard Lake, West Bloomfield, Northville and Farmington.

Name	Image	Year	Location	Notes
Our Lady of Refuge			3750 Commerce Rd., Orchard. Lake	
Our Lady of Sorrows			23815 Power Rd., Farmington	
Prince of Peace		1976	4300 Walnut Lake Rd., West Bloomfield	
St. Andrew Kim (Korean)			21177 Halsted Rd., Northville	
St. Fabian			32200 W.Twelve Mile Rd., Farmington Hills	

=== Thumb Vicariate Family 2 ===
This family contains parishes in Lapeer, Imlay City, Dryden and Capac

Name	Image	Year	Location	Notes
Immaculate Conception of the Blessed Virgin Mary	Immaculate Conception of the Blessed-Lapeer		814 W. Nepessing St., Lapeer	Historic church in Lapeer
Sacred Heart		1972	700 Maple Vista St., Imlay City	Parish founded in early 1850s
St. Cornelius	St. Cornelius-Dryden		3834 N. Mill Rd., Dryden	
St. Nicholas	St. Nicholas-Capac		4331 Capac Rd., Capac	

=== West Maple Family of Parishes ===
This family contains parishes in Birmingham, Beverly Hills and Bloomfield Hills.

Name	Image	Year	Location	Notes
Holy Name		1955	630 Harmon St., Birmingham	Church designed by George Diehl and Associates
Our Lady Queen of Martyrs		1951	32340 Pierce St., Beverly Hills	
St. Owen		1969	6869 Franklin Rd., Bloomfield Hills	Modern architecture
St. Regis		1968	3695 Lincoln Rd., Bloomfield Hills	Modern architecture

=== West Oakland Catholic Family of Parishes ===
This family includes parishes in Highland, Milford, White Lake and Waterford.

Name	Image	Year	Location	Notes
Holy Spirit			3700 Harvey Lake Rd., Highland	
St. Mary, Our Lady of the Snows			1955 E. Commerce Rd., Milford.	
St Patrick			9086 Hutchins Rd., White Lake	
St. Perpetua			134 Airport Rd., Waterford	

== South Region ==
=== Central Downriver Family of Parishes ===
This family includes parishes in Lincoln Park, Wyandotte and Southgate.

Name	Image	Year	Location	Notes
Christ the Good Shepherd		1947	1540 Riverbank St, Lincoln Park	
Our Lady of Scapular		2013	976 Pope John Paul II Ave, Wyandotte	Our Lady of Mt. Carmel Church (1899); Merged in 2013
St. Pius X		1950	14141 Pearl St.,Southgate	
St. Vincent Pallotti		2013	St. Joseph Church 334 Elm St., Wyandotte	St. Joseph Parish (1870) Merged in 2013
			St. Patrick Church 135 Superior Blvd., Wyandotte	St. Charles Borromeo Parish (1857) St. Patrick Parish (1886) Merged in 2013

=== Downriver Missionaries for Christ Family of Parishes ===
This family includes parishes in Woodhaven, Grosse Ile Riverview, Trenton and Flat Rock.

Name	Image	Year	Location	Notes
Our Lady of the Woods			21892 Gudith Rd., Woodhaven	
Sacred Heart		1968	21599 Parke Ln., Grosse Ile	Modern ten-sided structure with center altar; George Diehl, architect
St. Cyprian			13249 Pennsylvania Rd., Riverview	
St. Joseph			2565 3rd. St., Trenton	Parish established in 1849
St. Roch			25022 Gibraltar Rd.,Flat Rock	
St. Timothy			2901 Manning St., Trenton	

=== Emmanual Family of Parishes ===
This family includes parishes in Novi, South Lyon and Walled Lake.

Name	Image	Year	Location	Notes
Holy Family		1977	24505 Meadowbrook Rd., Novi	Parish formed in 1974; church dedicated in 1977
St. James		1993	46325 10 Mile Rd, Novi	Parish founded in 1989
St. Joseph		1966	830 S. Lafayette St., South Lyon	First church dedicated in 1910;
St. William			531 Common St., Walled Lake	

=== Hope Renewed Family of Parishes ===
This family includes parishes in Dearborn and Dearborn Heights

Name	Image	Year	Location	Notes
Divine Child			1055 North Silvery Ln., Dearborn	Parish founded in 1950
Sacred Heart		1937	22430 Michigan Ave., Dearborn	Parish founded in 1848
St. Anselm			17650 W Outer Dr, Dearborn Heights	Founded in 1954
St. Linus			6466 Evangeline St., Dearborn Heights	
St. Sabina			25605 Ann Arbor Tl, Dearborn Heights	

=== Pope Francis Family of Parishes ===
This family includes parishes in Northville, Livonia and Plymouth.

Name	Image	Year	Location	Notes
Our Lady of Victory		1957	133 Orchard. Dr., Northville	Parish dates to 1912
St. Colette			17600 Newburgh Rd, Livonia	
St. Edith			15089 Newburgh Rd, Livonia	
St. Kenneth		1968	14951 N. Haggerty Rd., Plymouth	Parish established in 1967

=== Livonia Area Family of Parishes ===
This family includes parishes in Livonia and Farmington.

Name	Image	Year	Location	Notes
St. Aidan			17500 Farmington Rd., Livonia	
St. Gerald		1964	21300 Farmington Rd., Farmington	Parish founded in 1964
St. Michael the Archangel		1962	11441 Hubbard. St., Livonia	Livonia's first parish, founded in 1931;
St. Priscilla			19120 Purlingbrook St, Livonia	

=== Lumen Christi Family of Parishes ===
This family includes parishes in Temperance and Erie.

Name	Image	Year	Location	Notes
Our Lady of Mount Carmel			8330 Lewis Ave., Temperance	Established as a mission church in 1957; church built in 1958
St. Anthony		1907	4605 St Anthony Rd., Temperance	
St. Joseph			2214 Manhattan St., Erie	

=== Metro Huron Family of Parishes ===
This family includes parishes in Romulus, Belleville and New Boston.

Name	Image	Year	Location	Notes
St. Aloysius Gonzaga			11280 Ozga St, Romulus	
St. Anthony			409 W Columbia Ave, Belleville	
St. Stephen			18858 Huron River Dr, New Boston	

=== Monroe Family of Parishes ===
This family includes parishes in Monroe and Newport.

Name	Image	Year	Location	Notes
St. Anne		1907	2420 N. Dixie Hwy, Monroe	
St. Charles Borromeo		1886	8109 Swan Creek Rd., Newport	Parish dates to 1847; current church completed in 1886
St. John the Baptist			511 S Monroe St., Monroe	
St. Mary		1839	127 N. Monroe St., Monroe	
St. Michael		1867	502 W. Front St., Monroe	Parish founded in 1852.

=== Mother of Divine Love Family of Parishes ===
This family includes parishes in Redford and Livonia.

Name	Image	Year	Location	Notes
Our Lady of Loretto		1954	17116 Olympia, Redford.	Parish established 1953
St. Genevieve - St. Maurice		1967	29015 Jamison St, Livonia	St. Genevieve Parish formed in 1959 and St. Maurice Parish in 1960; the two were merged in 2012
St. John XXIII			12100 Beech Daly Rd, Redford.	
St. Valentine			14841 Beech Daly, Redford	

=== Nankin Family of Parishes ===
This family includes parishes in Wayne, Westland and Garden City.

Name	Image	Year	Location	Notes
St. Mary			34530 W Michigan Ave, Wayne	
St. Mary, Cause of Our Joy			8200 N. Wayne Rd., Westland	
St. Richard			35851 Cherry Hill Rd., Westland	
St. Thomas the Apostle			31530 Beechwood Ave., Garden City	

=== Northwest Wayne Vicariate Family 4 ===
This family includes parishes in Plymouth and Canton.

Name	Image	Year	Location	Notes
Our Lady of Good Counsel			1062 Church St, Plymouth	
Resurrection			48755 Warren Rd.,Canton	
St. John Neumann		1978	44800 Warren Rd., Canton	Parish formed in 1976
St. Thomas a'Beckett			555 S. Lilley Rd., Canton	Parish formed in 1977

=== Rouge Family of Parishes ===
This family includes parishes in Dearborn and Dearborn Heights.

Name	Image	Year	Location	Notes
St. Alphonsus-St. Clement			13540 Gould St., Dearborn	
St. Barbara			13534 Colson Ave, Dearborn	
St Kateri Tekakwitha			16101 Rotunda Dr, Dearborn	
St. Maria Goretti			20710 Colgate St., Dearborn Heights	

=== Quo Vadis Family of Parishes ===
This family includes parishes in Taylor, Detroit, Ecorse, Allen Park and Melvindale.

Name	Image	Year	Location	Notes
Our Lady of the Angels			6442 Pelham Rd., Taylor	
St. Alfred			24175 Baske St, Taylor	
Ss. Andrew & Benedict			2430 S Beatrice St, Detroit	
St. Andre Bessette			4250 W Jefferson Ave, Ecorse	Founded in 2011 through merger of St. Francis Xavier Parish in Ecorse and Our Lady of Lourdes Parish in River Rouge; operates at the former St. Francis Xavier Church
St. Constance			21555 Kinyon St., Taylor	
St. Frances Cabrini			9000 Laurence Ave., Allen Park	
St. Mary Magadalen			19624 Wood St.,Melvindale	

=== Three Rivers Family of Parishes ===
This family includes parishes in Carleton, Ida and Rockwood.

Name	Image	Year	Location	Notes
Divine Grace		1873	2996 W Labo Rd., Carleton	Formed by the 2013 merger of St. Joseph Parish in Maybee and St. Patrick Parish in Carleton. It uses the Victorian Gothic church that was St. Patrick. The building is listed in the Register of Michigan State Historic Sites.
St. Gabriel			8295 Van Aiken St., Ida	
St. Mary, Our Lady of the Annunciation			32477 Church St., Rockwood	

== Former churches and other buildings ==
Name	Image	Year	Location	Style	Architect	Notes
Academy of the Sacred Heart / Grosse Pointe Academy		1928	171 Lake Shore Rd., Grosse Pointe Farms; 42°23′35″N 82°53′37″W	Tudor Revival	William Schickel, Magginnis and Walsh	Listed on the National Register of Historic Places and as a Michigan Historic Site.
Bishop Gallagher Residence		1925	1880 Wellesley Dr., Detroit; 42°26′3″N 83°7′4″W	Tudor Revival	McGinnis and Walsh	Part of the Palmer Woods Historic District on the National Register of Historic Places, and as a Michigan Historic Site. Sold in 1989
Chapel of St. Theresa-the Little Flower/ St. Patrick's		1926	58 Parsons St., Detroit; 42°20′54″N 83°3′36″W	Neo-Romanesque	Donaldson and Meier	Listed on the National Register of Historic Places. Formerly a chapel of St. Patrick's Cathedral; closed in 2015
Sacred Heart Major Seminary		1923	2701 W. Chicago Blvd., Detroit; 42.374919°N 83.111483°W	Classical Revival, Collegiate Gothic	Donaldson and Meier	Listed on the National Register of Historic Places and as a Michigan Historic Site
Cathedral of St. Anthony		1901	5247 Sheridan St, Detroit	Romanesque Revival	Donaldson and Meier	Listed as a Michigan Historic Site. Now part of the Ecumenical Catholic Church of Christ
St. Benedict Church		1915	16299 John R St., Highland Park			Church closed in 2013. Now operated by Soul Harvest Ministries.
St. Bonaventure Monastery		1883	1740 Mt. Elliott St., Detroit; 42°21′4″N 83°0′52″W	Gothic Revival	Peter J. Diederichs	Listed on the National Register of Historic Places and as a Michigan Historic Site.
Saints Peter and Paul Academy/ St. Patrick Senior Center		1892	64 Parsons St., Detroit; 42°20′54″N 83°3′37″W	Gothic Revival	Leon Coquard	Listed on the National Register of Historic Places.
St. Stanislaus Bishop and Martyr Church		1900	5818 Dubois St., Detroit; 42°22′19″N 83°2′49″W	Late Gothic Revival, Beaux-Arts, Renaissance	Kastler & Hunter, Harry J. Rill	Listed on the National Register of Historic Places and as a Michigan Historic Site. Ceased operating as a church in 1989.
St. Theresa of Avila Church		1919	8666 Quincy Ave., Detroit; 42°21′49″N 83°7′11″W	Romanesque Revival	Van Leyen, Schilling & Keough, Edward Schilling	Listed on the National Register of Historic Places and as a Michigan Historic Site. Closed in 1989.
