= Warren Woods Tower High School =

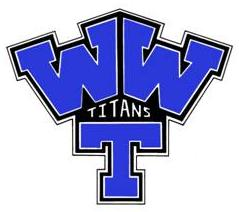

Location
- 27900 Bunert Road; Warren, Michigan 48088; United States; 42°30′03″N 82°58′40″W

Information
- Type: Public
- Established: 1983
- School district: Warren Woods Public Schools
- Principal: Jason Henshaw
- Teaching staff: 54.13 (on FTE basis)
- Grades: 9 to 12
- Enrollment: 1,023 (2023-2024)
- Student to teacher ratio: 18.88
- Colors: Blue and silver
- Athletics conference: Macomb Area Conference
- Nickname: Titans
- Website: www.warrenwoods.misd.net/our-schools/warren-woods-tower-high-school/

Warren Woods Tower High School, commonly referred to as WWT or Tower is a public high school in Warren, Michigan which educates students in grades 9–12. It is a part of the Warren Woods Public Schools school district. Ian Fredlund is the school principal. Its athletic teams are known as the Titans, and the school colors are Honolulu Blue and Silver. The school is the result of the 1983 merger of Robert S. Tower and Warren Woods High Schools. Robert S. Tower was Superintendent of the Warren Woods School District in the 1960s and early 1970s. Tower's athletic teams during the beginning until 1983 were known as the Vikings.

== History ==
Warren Woods High School opened in 1965 and graduated its first group of seniors in 1967. Its athletic teams were nicknamed "Titans" and its school colors were blue and silver. The school won the State Class B football championship in 1978. Due to declining enrollment, the school closed in 1983 and merged with Robert S. Tower High School. The merged school was located on the old Tower High School site, as it was a newer campus. Warren Woods Middle School now sits on the old Warren Woods High School site and Enterprise High School is located on the old Warren Woods Middle School site.

== Demographics ==
The demographic breakdown of the 1,133 students enrolled for the 2012–2013 school year was:

- Male - 46.3%
- Female - 53.7%
- Native American/Alaskan - 0.2%
- Asian/Pacific islander - 6.9%
- Black - 14.0%
- Hispanic - 1.5%
- White - 73.8%
- Multiracial - 3.6%

In addition, 43.9% of the students qualified for free or reduced lunches.
