= Macomb Community College =

Community college in Macomb County, Michigan, U.S.

- Type: Community college
- Established: 1954
- Students: 15,946 (fall 2022)
- Location: Warren, Michigan, U.S.
- Mascot: Monarch
- Website: macomb.edu

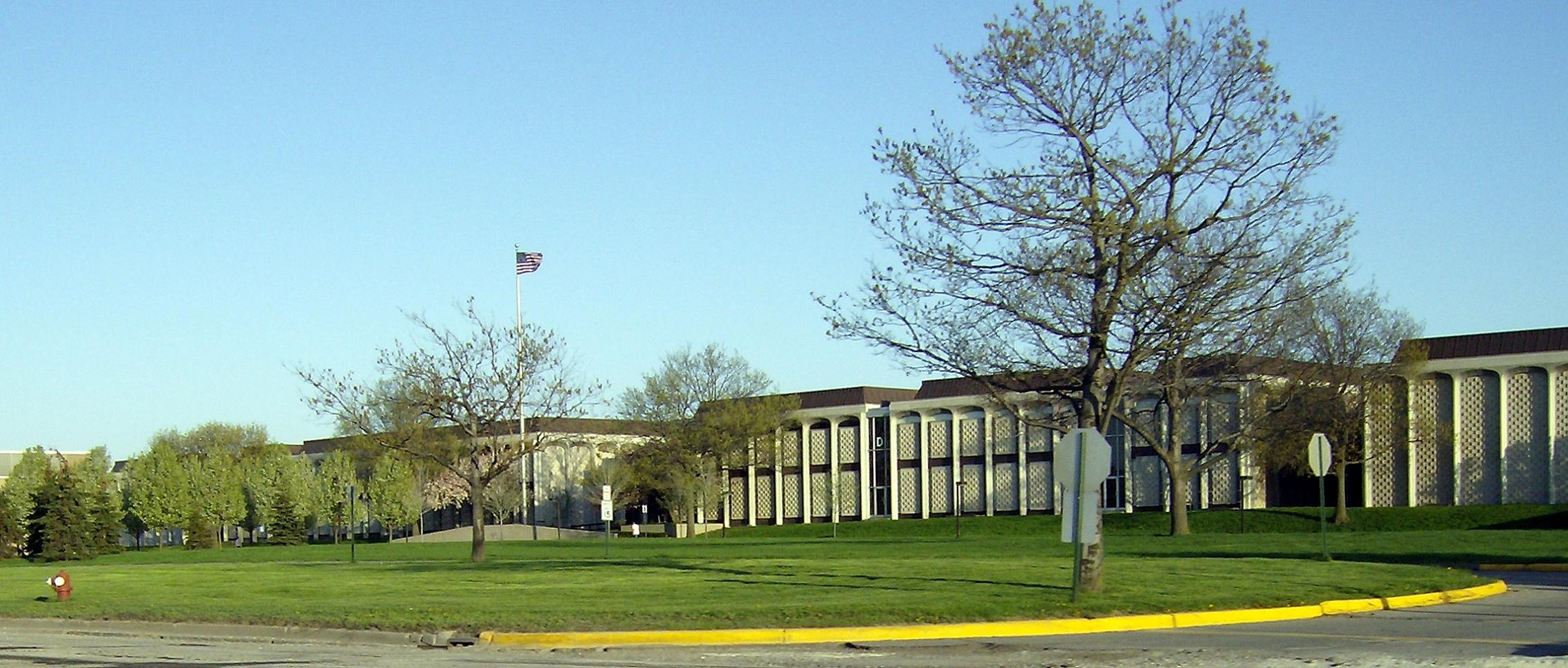

Macomb Community College is a multi-campus community college in Warren, Michigan. The college is accredited by the Higher Learning Commission. The college's offerings include university transfer, early college, professional certification, workforce development, continuing education and enrichment. Through its nationally acclaimed University Center, which opened in 1991, it offers bachelor's degree completion and graduate level programs. Growing steadily from the first 84 students that showed up for class on September 16, 1954 at Lincoln High School in Warren, Michigan, Macomb now serves approximately 59,000 annually.

Because of its location in Macomb County, often cited as a political bellwether, and its reputation for workforce training and retraining, Macomb has been a popular stop for presidents launching new educational initiatives and presidential candidates on the campaign trail. It has hosted every U.S. president since Ronald Reagan at least once, including President Donald Trump twice in 2016.

== History ==
South Macomb Community College, as it was first called, was founded by educators from the Van Dyke School District who believed the lack of access to higher education was greatly impeding the success of the county and its residents. The first classes were held after hours in the district's Lincoln High School, with a transfer curriculum developed in collaboration with educators from the University of Michigan, Michigan State University and Wayne State University.

Enrollment at Macomb reached 3,000 by 1962. With the college rapidly outgrowing the space allotted to it by the school district, its founders developed a plan to expand its size and scope. The go-ahead was given in 1962 when Macomb County voters approved an operating millage to support the Community College District of Macomb, autonomous of the Van Dyke School District. The 20-year operating millage has been reauthorized twice by voters.

After passage of the first millage, an ambitious construction program ensued for the newly named Macomb County Community College. South Campus in Warren opened in 1965, and Center Campus in Clinton Township opened in 1968. East Campus, which houses a training center for police, fire and emergency services personnel, opened in 1996, and M-TEC, dedicated to workforce development, opened in 2002. The college purchased (and later sold) property in Ray Township for a North Campus that never materialized and previously operated a campus and a satellite in Fraser and Washington Township, respectively.

The school shortened its name to Macomb Community College in 1981.

== Funding ==
The college offers nearly 200 degree and certificate programs, including those in high-tech and high-demand fields.

Because of the generosity of donors to the Macomb Community College Foundation, there are more than 100 private scholarships for Macomb students. In 2009, Macomb became one of the first community colleges to join Achieving the Dream, a national initiative aimed at helping community college students succeed. The Dreamkeepers Emergency Assistance Fund and the Mall at Partridge Creek Student Assistance Fund, coordinated by the College's Student Options for Success office, provide financial assistance to eligible students in the event of a one-time financial emergency that hinders their ability to continue college.

== Other college initiatives ==
- Center for Advanced Automotive Technology (CAAT): a regional resource and Macomb/Wayne State University partnership funded by the National Science Foundation
- Center for Innovation and Entrepreneurship: a free resource for entrepreneurs – both Macomb students and community residents
- Conference and event services, including the Macomb Sports and Expo Center: home to the College's men's and women's athletic teams (Monarchs - Michigan Community College Athletic Association members)
- Innovation Fund Macomb Community College, Powered by JPMorgan Chase & Co., awarding seed funding to startups in an effort to stimulate regional economical development and job growth
- Albert L. Lorenzo Cultural Center: providing an ever-changing slate of free cultural programming
- Macomb Center for the Performing Arts: hosting national recording artists and touring companies as well as local arts organizations
- Procurement Technical Assistance Center (inside MTEC): assisting local companies in securing government contracts

== Notable alumni ==
- Matt Busch, artist and filmmaker
- Mark Hackel, Macomb County Executive
- Steve Kardynal, YouTube personality
- Thomas Ligotti, author
- Steve McCatty, former MLB pitcher
- Candice Miller, Macomb County Public Works Commissioner
- Cynthia Watros, actress and Daytime Emmy winner
- Ernie Whitt, former MLB catcher

== Campus locations ==
- South Campus: 14500 12 Mile Road, Warren, MI 48088 (42°30′16.7″N 82°58′24.8″W)
- Center Campus: 44575 Garfield Road, Clinton Township, MI 48038 (42°37′20.2″N 82°57′28.5″W)
- East Campus: 21901 Dunham Road, Clinton Township, MI 48036 (42°37′18.0″N 82°53′25.2″W)
- MTEC: 7900 Tank Ave., Warren, MI 48092 (42°29′54.5″N 83°01′44.4″W)

== See also ==
- Motor City Nine: a part of the Weather Underground at the school
- Category:Macomb Community College alumni
