= Warren Woods Public Schools =

School district in Michigan

Address
- 12900 Frazho Road Warren, Macomb, Michigan, 48089; United States

District information
- Grades: Pre-Kindergarten-12
- Superintendent: Stacey Denewith
- Schools: 7
- Budget: $56,293,000 2022-2023 expenditures
- NCES District ID: 2635220

Students and staff
- Students: 3,035 (2024-2025)
- Teachers: 179.83 (on an FTE basis) (2024-2025)
- Staff: 423.32 FTE (2024-2025)
- Student–teacher ratio: 16.88 (2024-2025)

Other information
- Website: www.warrenwoods.misd.net

Warren Woods Public Schools is a public school district in Metro Detroit. It serves about six square miles of Warren in Macomb County, Michigan.

== History ==
By 1959, the district was established and voters approved a $980,000 bond issue ($10.9 million in 2025 dollars) to build three elementary schools.

The district's first high school, Warren Woods High School, opened in 1965. Currently it is the site of the district's middle school. Robert Tower High School was dedicated in 1973. The schools combined in the fall of 1983 at the Tower High School site, forming Warren Woods Tower High School.

In 2005 the school district began a three-year program intended to update and renovate its school buildings. In 2017 The district proposed a $20 Million bond issue. The money was to be allocated to infrastructure and technology improvements. It would also be used to replace some buses. The bond issue was approved later that year.

== Schools ==
Schools in Warren Woods Public Schools district
School	Address	Notes
Warren Woods Tower High School	27900 Bunert Rd.	Grades 9–12. Built 1973.
Enterprise High School	28600 Suburban	Alternative high school. Grades 9–12.
Warren Woods Middle School	13400 East 12 Mile	Grades 6–8. Mascot: Wolverines. Built 1965.
Westwood Elementary	11999 Martin Rd.	Grades K-5
Pinewood Elementary	14411 Bade Dr.	Grades K-5
Briarwood Elementary	14100 Leisure	Grades K-5
Early Childhood Center	12900 Frazho Rd.	Preschool
