= Lincoln High School (Warren, Michigan) =

Location
- 22900 Federal Avenue; Warren, Michigan 48089; United States; 42°27′44″N 83°01′14″W

Information
- Type: Public
- Motto: "LHS - Setting New Standards"
- School district: Van Dyke Public Schools
- Principal: Billie Szcepaniak
- Teaching staff: 33.65 (on an FTE basis)
- Grades: 9 -12
- Enrollment: 516 (2023-2024)
- Student to teacher ratio: 15.33
- Colors: Red; Black; White
- Team name: Abes
- Rivals: Center Line High School
- Website: www.vdps.net/o/lhs

Lincoln High School is a public high school located in Warren, Michigan, United States. It is the only high school in Van Dyke Public Schools, which serves portions of Warren and a small section of Center Line. In 2023–2024, Lincoln High School had 575 students in grades 9–12. It has a current teacher/student ration of 13.3 to 1.

== History ==
In 1951, the cornerstone was laid for the new high school building, and it was completed in 1953. It was named in memory of Mr. James L. Truax. Truax served 20 years as a teacher, principal, district superintendent, and was killed in an automobile accident.

The district started in 1879. The VanDyke School, called simply "the school house" was the first one-room school in Warren Township, District #5. It was sited where the Washington School now stands. The building housed grades 1-8. In 1921-22 Growth in the township led to construiction of a new three story, six room brick building on the corner of Studebaker and Federal Streets. It housed grades 1–9. In 1925 the cornerstone was laid for a new addition to Lincoln School. Three students were in its first 4-year graduating class in 1927. That year was the advent of sports competition. In 1930, the girls basketball team won their first championship. 1933 was a big year: (a) first year book published; (b) School competed in for boys sports: Baseball, Basketball, Football and Track and field; and(c) Basketball for girls, the Lincoln "Lassies" 1934- who shared the football championship with Berkley. The organized band started in 1934. The girls basketball team shared the 1935 championship with Berkley. They won the championship in 1936, as did the boys basketball, which won the district championship. In 1938, the boys baseball team won the league championship.

In 1939 a vocational wing was added. In 1940, a Homemaking curriculaum was developed and the student council started. 1941 saw it become a designated “Defense building” which the U.S.O. dedicated. Used initially for dances and recreation and dances, it was transformed into an administration building and demolished in 1973. 1941 saw the Cross Country team become regional champions class B. In 1942 a Counseling Service inaugurated in high school and an Orthopedic room for handicapped children was equipped.

Macomb Community College spent a decade in the building, from 1954 to 1964, when it became a separate school per a county wide referendum.

The pool was added in 1958, being "one of the first in the county." A new school library opened in 1964. An auditorium, stadium and Fine Arts were completed in 1972.

== Trivia ==
The Brown Jug rivalry football game between Center Line High School and Lincoln High School began in 1947 and remains one of the oldest high school football rivalries in the state of Michigan.

== Notable students ==
- Eminem, rapper, dropped out
- Danhausen, professional wrestler
