= St. Theresa of Avila Roman Catholic Church =

Historic church in Michigan, United States

- St. Theresa of Avila Roman Catholic Parish Complex
- U.S. National Register of Historic Places
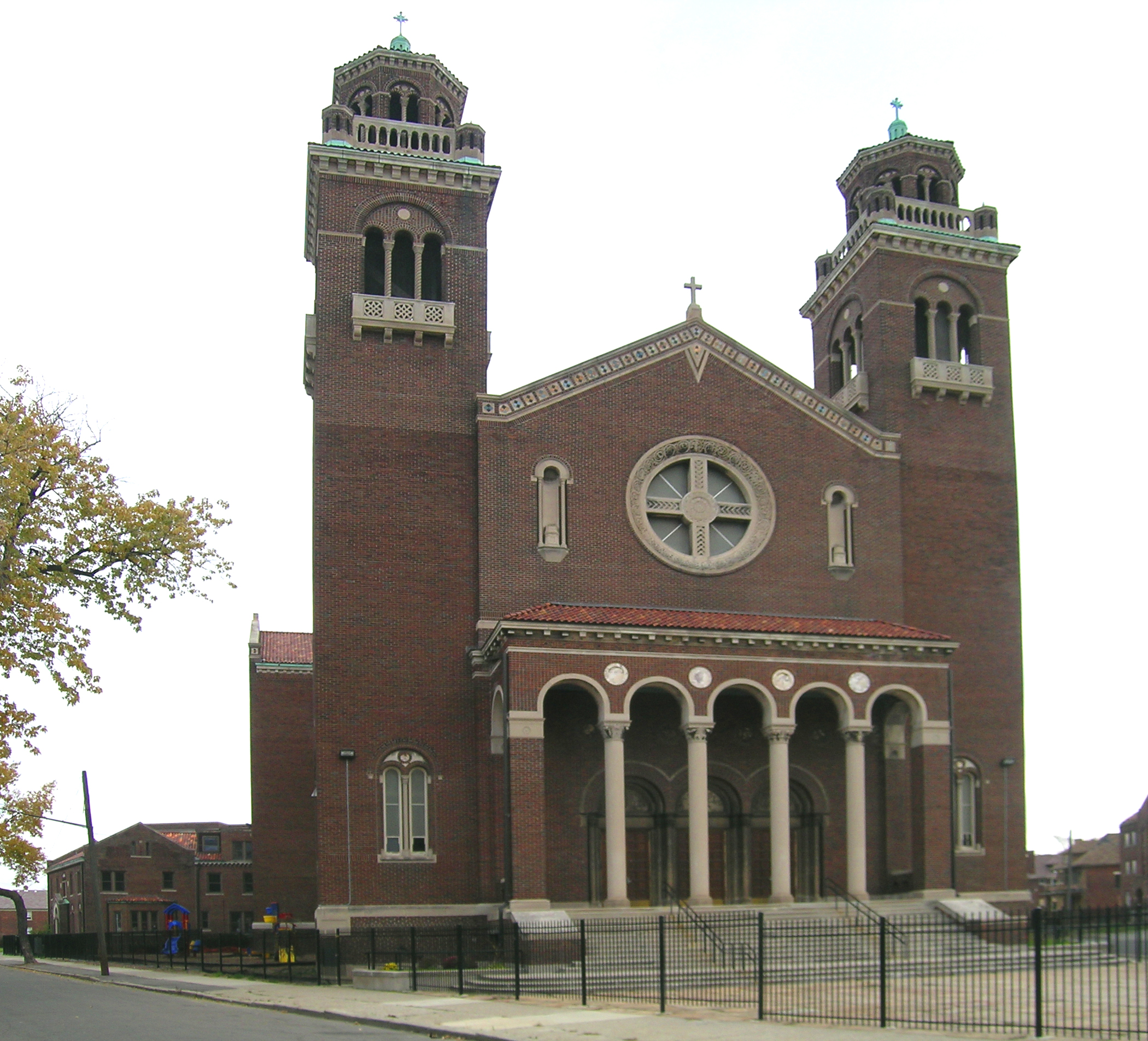
- Interactive map
- Location: 8666 Quincy Street; Detroit, Michigan
- Coordinates: 42°21′49″N 83°7′11″W
- Built: 1919
- Architect: Van Leyen, Schilling & Keough, Edward Schilling
- Architectural style: Late 19th And 20th century Revivals, Romanesque Revival
- NRHP reference No.: 89000786
- Added to NRHP: July 14, 1989

The St. Theresa of Avila Roman Catholic Church is a church located at 8666 Quincy Street in Detroit, Michigan. It was listed on the National Register of Historic Places in 1989.

== Description ==
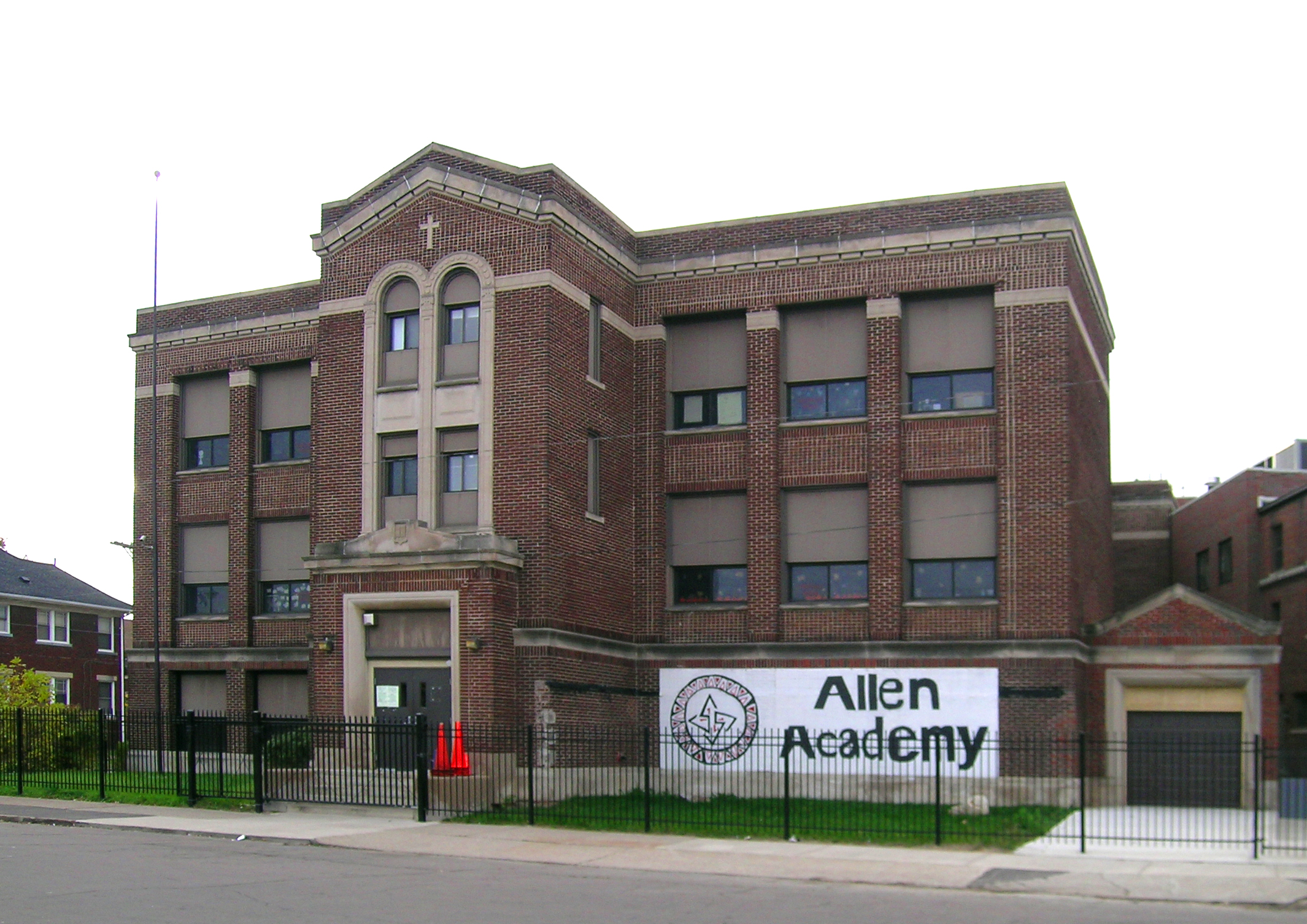
School (Allen Academy)

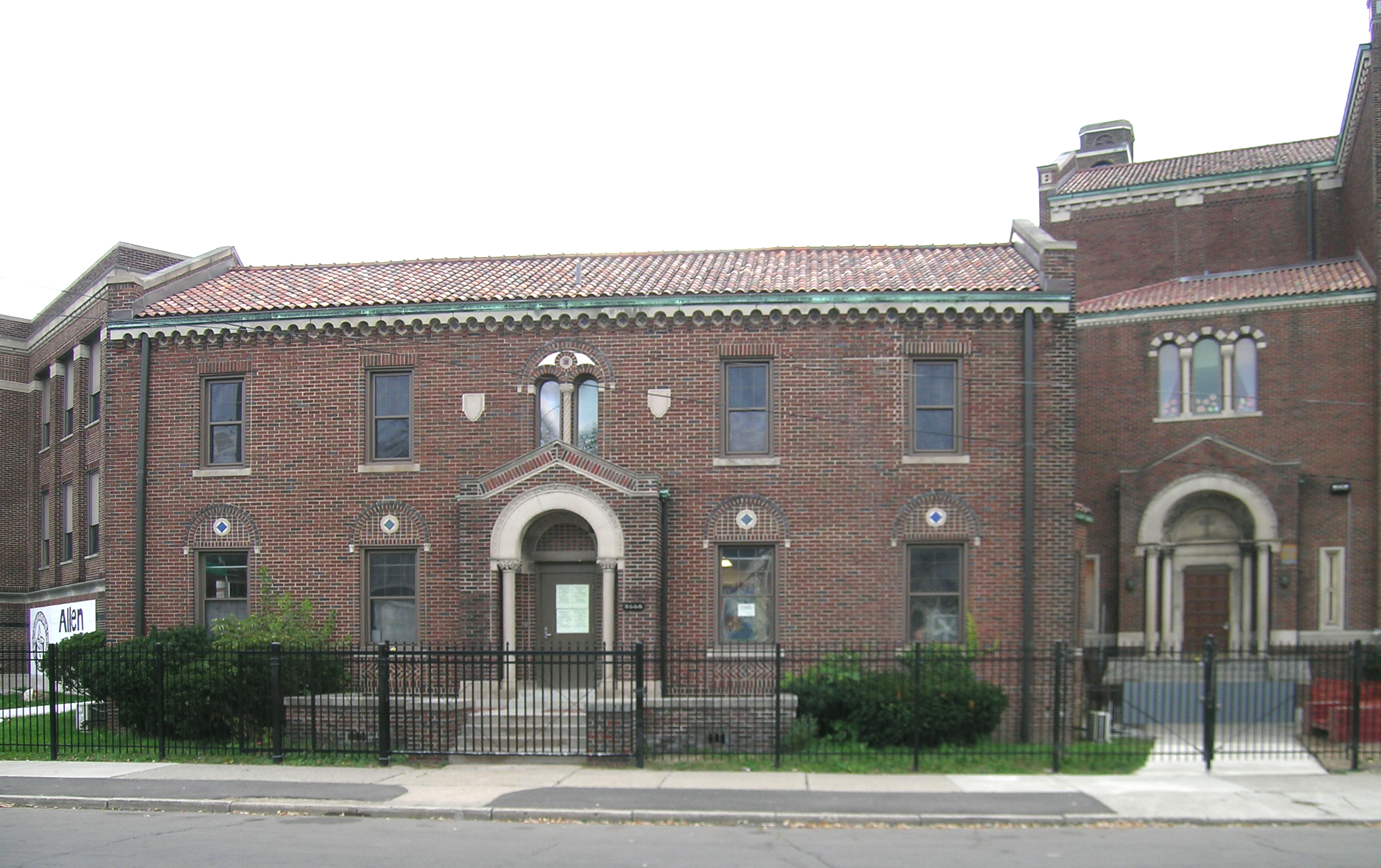
Rectory

The St. Theresa of Avila Roman Catholic Parish Complex consists of the church, rectory, school, and convent. All of the buildings are essentially Neo-Romanesque in character, and are constructed of dark red brick trimmed with Indiana limestone.

The church is in the Italian Romanesque style, with Byzantine and Art Deco influences. It has a gable front facade with towers at the sides. The entrance is through a five-arched, two-story Romanesque arcaded portico. Above the entrance is a round window flanked with arched niches.

The school is a three-story I-shaped building; the rectory is a five-bay center entrance house with Romanesque Revival details. The three-story convent building, which was built during the Great Depression, features more modest ornamentation. A central pavilion containing the entrance divides the building into three elements.

== Significance ==
The St. Theresa of Avila Parish was built as an Irish-American parish, built at a time when the prosperity of the community was such that this magnificent complex could be afforded. The need for this building reflects the population boom in the city brought about by the automobile industry.

The parish was closed in 1989; the Allen Academy, a K-12 charter school, used the school building from 1999 to 2016.

From 1990 to 1998 the school was operated as Martyrs of a Uganda Catholic Academy with over 400 students at its highest enrollment. The adjacent parish remained closed during this time and mass was held at Martyrs of Uganda Catholic Church on 12th Street within the former property of St. Agnes.
