= Van Dyke Public Schools =

School district in Michigan

Address
- 23500 Mac Arthur Blvd. Warren, Macomb, Michigan, 48089; United States

District information
- Grades: Pre-Kindergarten-12
- Superintendent: Piper Bognar
- Schools: 6
- Budget: $47,864,000 2022-2023 expenditures
- NCES District ID: 2634680

Students and staff
- Students: 2,085 (2024-2025)
- Teachers: 150.05 (on an FTE basis) (2024-2025)
- Staff: 351.85 FTE (2024-2025)
- Student–teacher ratio: 13.9 (2024-2025)

Other information
- Website: www.vdps.net

Van Dyke Public Schools is a public school district in Metro Detroit. It is one of the six school districts in Warren, serving the southeast part of the city. It also serves part of Center Line.

== History ==
The first school in Warren Township District No. 5 (which would become Van Dyke Public Schools) was built in 1879. In 1921, a school was built at the corner of Washington and Federal Streets that would become the first high school in the district. In 1927, the first high school class graduated.

Lincoln Junior High was located between the former high school (what would become Lincoln Elementary) and the present high school. It was torn down during the 1972-1973 school year and a new middle school constructed it its place.

Earl G. Meyer was the architect hired by the district to design its schools in the 1950s, such as Lincoln High School, McKinley Elementary, and Wolcott Junior High School. Wolcott Junior High built was in 1955 but was put up for sale in 1978.

The current Lincoln High School was completed in 1953. Additions to the high school include a pool in 1958, a library in 1964, auditorium and a fine arts wing in 1972. Several improvements, designed by architecture firm Partners in Architecture, were also made to district facilities as a result of the 2008 bond issue.

In 1954, the district established South Macomb Community College and operated it at Lincoln High School. In 1963, operation of the college became independent of the school district.

== Schools ==
Schools in Van Dyke Public Schools district
School	Address	Notes
Lincoln High School	22900 Federal, Warren	Grades 9-12
Lincoln Middle School	22500 Federal, Warren	Grades 6-8
Lincoln Elementary	22100 Federal, Warren	Grades K-5
Carlson Elementary	12355 Mruk Avenue, Warren	Grades K-5. Opened 1961.
McKinley Elementary	13173 Toepfer Rd., Warren	Grades K-5
Kennedy Early Childhood Center	11333 Kaltz Ave, Warren	Preschool. Built 1964.
Success Academy	23500 Mac Arthur, Warren	Alternative school

=== Former schools ===
- Washington Elementary School
- John F. Kennedy Elementary School, built 1964, now Early Childhood Center
- Harding Elementary School, built 1925
- Elizabeth Little Elementary School, built 1953
- Wolcott Junior High School, built 1955
- Thompson Elementary School, built 1965
- Kramer Elementary School, built 1940, reconstructed 1970
- Macomb Park Elementary
