= Center Line Public Schools =

School district in Michigan, United States

Address
- 26400 Arsenal Center Line, Macomb, Michigan, 48015; United States

District information
- Grades: Pre-Kindergarten-12
- Superintendent: Joseph Haynes
- Schools: 6
- Budget: $50,223,000 2022-2023 expenditures
- NCES District ID: 2608580

Students and staff
- Students: 2,524 (2024-2025)
- Teachers: 163.77 (on an FTE basis) (2024-2025)
- Staff: 382.27 FTE (2024-2025)
- Student–teacher ratio: 15.41 (2024-2025)

Other information
- Website: www.clps.org

Center Line Public Schools is a public school district in Metro Detroit. It serves most of Center Line and parts of Warren.

== History ==
The first school within the present district's boundaries was built around 1875 at the corner of Sherwood and Ten Mile Road. The district officially states that the district was founded in 1899.

Busch High School was built in 1922 at 6761 East Ten Mile Road. It served as the district's high school prior to 1954, when the current high school was built.

During World War II, the district’s population grew as industrial jobs supporting the war effort—including those at the Detroit Arsenal—drew new workers to the area. With a grant from the federal government, Victory Elementary was built in 1942. It was demolished in 2024 and, with the assistance of the Macomb County government and Michigan State University, the site became the Victory Garden, an agricultural teaching lab.

In 1944, the district stopped providing full-day high school instruction. In 1951, Center Line superintendents Russell Isbister and Clarance Crothers advocated for a dedicated high school building and comprehensive instruction. It opened in fall of 1954.

== Schools ==
Schools in Center Line Public Schools district
| School | Address | Notes |
|---|---|---|
| Center Line High School | 26300 Arsenal, Center Line | Grades 9-12. Built 1954. |
| Wolfe Middle School | 8640 McKinley, Center Line | Grades 6-8. Built 1961. |
| Academy 21 Virtual School | 11300 Engleman, Warren | Grades 6-12. Hybrid in-person and online school. Shares a building with Early Childhood Center. Built 1963. |
| Crothers Elementary School | 27401 Campbell, Warren | Grades K-5. Built 1966. |
| Peck Elementary School | 26201 Lorraine, Center Line | Grades K-5. Built 2020. |
| Roose Elementary School | 4701 Marcy, Warren | Grades K-5. Built 1941, renovated 2022. |
| Early Childhood Center | 11300 Engleman, Warren | Preschool. Built 1963. |

=== Former Schools ===
- Busch High School, built 1922
- Ellis School, built 1926
- Miller Elementary. Built 1950, closed June 2010. Leased to Rising Stars Academy starting in 2012.
- Sherwood Elementary, 26091 Sherwood. Built 1950, closed in 1974.
