= List of New England Conservatory people =

This is a partial listing of alumni and professors and teachers of the New England Conservatory, Boston.

== Alumni ==
_{More former students can be found at Category:New England Conservatory alumni.}

- Eunice Alberts, contralto
- Charlie Albright, pianist and composer
- Kenneth Amis, composer, tuba player, educator, and conductor
- Ted Atkatz, percussionist
- Martha Atwell, radio director
- Ross Bauer, composer
- Rick Beato, musician, YouTuber, music educator
- Lauren Bernofsky, composer
- Adam Birnbaum, pianist, composer, music educator
- Herbert Blomstedt, conductor
- Neal E. Boyd, pop and "opera" singer
- Cindy Bradley, jazz trumpet player and composer
- George Brooks, saxophonist
- Alex Brown, pianist
- Nellie Moyer Budd, music teacher
- Percy Jewett Burrell, dramatist and playwright
- Don Byron, jazz clarinetist and composer
- Sarah Caldwell, conductor
- Sean Callery, composer
- Colin Carr, cellist
- Regina Carter, violinist
- Young-Chang Cho, cellist
- John Clark, jazz horn player and composer
- Lora Haines Cook, 12th president general of the Daughters of the American Revolution
- Becca Conviser, operatic soprano
- Marilyn Crispell, jazz pianist
- Tan Crone, pianist
- Phyllis Curtin, soprano
- Rob Dehlinger, trumpeter, singer/songwriter
- Roberto Diaz, violist
- Mary A. G. Dight, physician
- Dave Douglas, jazz trumpet
- Marion Davison Duffie, classical singer and voice teacher
- David Dusing, tenor, composer, arranger, and conductor
- Marty Ehrlich, jazz saxophonist
- Halim El-Dabh, composer
- Ehud Ettun, bassist and composer
- Mohammed Fairouz, composer
- Melissa Ferlaak, soprano
- Everett "Vic" Firth, percussionist
- Ann Davison Duffie Fleck, percussionist
- Jason Forbach, actor, singer, playwright and filmmaker
- David Frank, pianist, producer, composer
- Satoko Fujii, avant garde jazz pianist
- Michael Gandolfi, composer
- Bianca Garcia, flute, politician
- Marilinda Garcia, harp, politician
- Anthony Glise, classical guitarist, composer, author
- Judith Gordon, pianist
- Denyce Graves, mezzo-soprano
- Marva Griffin Carter, musicologist, author, and professor of music at Georgia State University
- Zona Maie Griswold, soprano
- D. Antoinette Handy, flautist
- Fred Hersch, jazz pianist
- Bud Herseth, trumpet
- Randall Hodgkinson, pianist
- Dave Holland, jazz bassist
- Winifred Horan, fiddler
- Alan Hovhaness, composer
- Marie Jansen, musical theatre actress
- Sarah Jarosz, singer/songwriter, mandolin, banjo, guitar
- Rebecca Richardson Joslin (1846–1934), author, lecturer, benefactor, clubwoman
- Rose Fitzgerald Kennedy, Kennedy family matriarch
- Sunny Kim, jazz vocals
- Coretta Scott King, voice, civil rights leader
- Nobu Kōda, Japanese violinist, educator, and composer
- Mátti Kovler, composer
- Louis Krasner, violinist
- Vuk Kulenovic, classical composer
- Eugene Edward Lacritz, conductor, clarinetist, executive
- Brian Landrus, saxophonist, flutist, clarinetist, composer
- Thomas Oboe Lee, composer
- Duke Levine, guitarist, composer
- Yunchan Lim, pianist
- Ruth Lomon, Canadian composer and pianist
- Larry Marshall, actor and singer
- Heather Masse, singer
- Andy McGhee, jazz saxophonist, educator
- John Medeski, jazz pianist
- Nellie Brown Mitchell, 19th-century African-American soprano
- Dorothea Rhodes Lummis Moore, physician, writer, newspaper editor, activist
- John Moriarty, conductor, stage director, pianist
- Dorothy Morton, soprano and actress
- Aoife O'Donovan, singer/songwriter
- Takae Ohnishi, harpsichordist
- Christopher O'Riley, pianist
- Gladys Pitcher, composer
- Conrad Pope, composer, arranger, and film orchestrator
- Cora Scott Pond Pope, teacher, pageant writer, real estate developer
- Florence Price, composer
- Rachael Price, jazz vocalist
- Ann Ritonia, U.S. marine and priest
- Pete Robbins, jazz saxophonist
- Matana Roberts, jazz saxophonist, composer and visual artist
- Marcus Rojas, tubist
- Lisa Saffer, soprano and teacher
- Jamie Saft, pianist/multi-instrumentalist
- Nick Sanders, jazz pianist and composer
- David Sanford, composer and jazz bandleader
- Byron Schenkman, harpsichordist, pianist
- Sergey Schepkin, pianist
- Andrew Scott, jazz guitarist and professor
- Deke Sharon, a cappella vocalist, arranger, producer
- Luciana Souza, jazz vocals
- David Spelman, guitarist, producer, curator
- Isabele Taliaferro Spiller, musician, music educator, and school co-founder
- Lara St. John, violinist
- Eleanor Steber, soprano
- Robert Strassburg, composer, conductor, musicologist, professor
- Cecil Taylor, jazz pianist
- Nestor Torres, Latin jazz flutist
- Nicholas Urie, jazz composer, arranger
- Monir Vakili, singer
- Burr Van Nostrand, composer
- Tom Varner, jazz French hornist, composer
- VenetianPrincess, soprano
- Cuong Vu, trumpeter
- Linda Watson , dramatic soprano and academic voice teacher
- Chou Wen-chung, composer
- Mildred Weston, author, composer
- Elise Fellows White, composer, violinist
- Raymond Wilding-White, composer
- Henry F. Williams, composer
- Bruce Wolosoff, composer
- Bernie Worrell, pianist, rock musician
- Yitzhak Yedid, composer & pianist
- Rachel Z, jazz performer
- Nancy Zhou, violinist
- Zhu Xiao-Mei, pianist
- Zitkala-Sa

_{More former students can be found at Category:New England Conservatory alumni.}

== Notable past and present teachers ==
_{More former and present teachers can be found at Category:New England Conservatory faculty.}

- Timothee Adamowski
- Kati Agócs
- Katja Andy
- Trevor Barnard
- Jeanne Baxtresser
- Jerry Bergonzi
- Ran Blake
- Bob Brookmeyer
- Bruce Brubaker
- Richard Burgin
- Ferruccio Busoni
- Jaki Byard
- Simon Carrington
- Gabriel Chodos
- Robert Cogan
- Vinson Cole
- Francis Judd Cooke
- Patricia Craig
- Dorothy DeLay
- Lorna Cooke deVaron
- Stephen Drury
- Doriot Anthony Dwyer
- Dominique Eade
- Pozzi Escot
- Robin Eubanks
- John Ferrillo
- Vic Firth
- Eliot Fisk
- Alan Fletcher
- D'Anna Fortunato
- Michael Gandolfi
- George Garzone
- Boris Goldovsky
- Bernard Greenhouse
- Billy Hart
- Fred Hersch
- Randall Hodgkinson
- Dave Holland
- Karen Holvik
- Lee Hyla
- Paul Kantor
- Kim Kashkashian
- Eyran Katsenelenbogen
- Paul Katz
- Harrison Keller
- Rudolf Kolisch
- Louis Krasner
- Eugene Lehner
- Theodore Lettvin
- Joe Maneri
- Donald Martino
- Cecil McBee
- John McNeil
- Gladys Childs Miller
- Ossian Everett Mills
- Jason Moran
- Hankus Netsky
- Donald Palma
- Maurice W. Parker, Sr.
- Danilo Perez
- Ann Hobson Pilot
- Cora Scott Pond Pope
- Quincy Porter
- Paula Robison
- Carol Rodland
- Eric Rosenblith
- George Russell
- Lisa Saffer
- Ken Schaphorst
- Gunther Schuller
- Russell Sherman
- Joseph Silverstein
- Nicolas Slonimsky
- Fenwick Smith
- Richard Stoltzman
- Antoinette Szumowska
- Bertha Tapper
- Miroslav Vitouš
- Beveridge Webster
- Blanche Winogron
- Felix Wolfes
- Hugh Wolff
- Douglas Yeo
- Edward Zambara
- Benjamin Zander

_{More former and present teachers can be found at Category:New England Conservatory faculty.}
