= Dehlinger =

Dehlinger is a surname. Notable people with the surname include:

- Quinn Dehlinger (born 2002), American freestyle skier
- Rob Dehlinger, American singer-songwriter
