= Gladys Childs Miller =

Gladys Childs Miller (married Demeter Zachareff; May 5, 1902 – March 3, 1979) was a highly influential voice teacher at the New England Conservatory of Music in Boston for over fifty years. She helped launch the careers of several international opera stars in the 20th century, including Rosalind Elias, D'Anna Fortunato, Janice Meyerson, Florence Louise Pettitt, Lucy Shelton and Maria Spacagna.

== Alumnae ==
- Rosalind Elias joined the Metropolitan Opera in 1958, and sang at the Paris and Vienna operas.
- D'Anna Fortunato sang at Lincoln Center, and performed with the Opera Company of Boston, as well as the New York City Opera. She teaches at New England Conservatory.
- Florence Louise Pettitt became founder and conductor of an opera company in Massachusetts, and sang in Boston for many years.
- Maria Spacagna made her debut at the Metropolitan Opera opposite Luciano Pavarotti singing the title role in Verdi's Luisa Miller. Other notable theaters are Teatro alla Scala, where she was the first American to have performed the role of Madama Butterfly. She also performed at La Fenice (Venice), Arena di Verona (Verona), the Festival Pucciniana (Torre del Lago, summer home of Giacomo Puccini), the Deutsche Opera (Berlin), New York City Opera (Manhattan, New York), the Dallas Opera, the San Francisco Opera, the Opera Theater of Montreal, the Canadian Opera in Toronto as well as other venues.

== Legacy ==
- Gladys Childs Miller Scholarship

== Sources ==
- New England Conservatory's "Measure by Measure", an institutional history published in 1995 by the New England Conservatory, Boston, Massachusetts.
- See also pages 40–41 of "Indeed Music" by Chester Williams, published in 1989 by the New England Conservatory, Boston.
