= London Bridgez =

American poet

Jamara Mychelle Wakefield
- Born: January 25, 1982 (age 44); Boston, MA
- Occupation: Poet/Theatre Artist
- Writing career
- Subjects: Jazz, Blues, African-American and Black Diaspora History, Gender and Sexuality, Theatrical Jazz Aesthetic
- Notable works: Love Words Soft Spoken, SHE

Jamara Mychelle Wakefield (born January 25, 1982, in Boston, Massachusetts) is an American spoken word poet, community organizer and writer, previously known by her stage name London Bridgez. She founded Neo.logic Beatnik Assembly, an idea shop and creative arts production company, and organized the TEDxRoxburyWomen event featured on Basic Black, a TEDTalks event in Boston.

Wakefield was born at home on 19 Mt. Ida Road in the Uphams Corner Dorchester neighborhood of Boston, Massachusetts.

She has released two EPs, Love Words Soft Spoken and SHE. In 2014 she released her third studio album Children of the Night In 2018, she released the EP titled Unplugged In 2020, she released the album MARY

Although she started as a solo poet, she sometimes has an entire band or performs with a live scratch DJ.

== Performances ==
She has appeared throughout New England and across the US. Performances include Bayard Rustin Community Breakfast sponsored by the Aids Action Committee, a YWCA fundraiser to support the production of VDAY Lawrence, Queer Women of Color Week Provincetown Women of Color Weekend, the Hispanic & Black Gay Coalition Panel Series, the Milwaukee Pridefest, Fresh Fruit Festival, National Day of Silence, NYC Pridefest Stage, Sister's Talk Radio and the Aids Walk Boston Opening Ceremonies. She performed as "Lady in Green" in Pariah Theatre's June 2014 rendition of For Colored Girls Who Have Considered Suicide When the Rainbow is Enuf, originally written by Ntozake Shange.

Other performance credits include the Nuyorican, Tutuma Social Club, Williamsburg Jazz Center Brooklyn, The Indigo Lounge Los Angeles, Manhattan Neighborhood Network TV One Different Community Voices Show, Nashville based BB KING's Restaurant & Lounge, Boston Greenfest, The Strand Theater- Boston, Acoustic Soul Lounge- Manhattan, MIT, Northeastern University, Emerson College, Anna Deveare Smith's Mattering Forum, and BAM Fischer. In 2016, she was a short list finalist for the 2016 Leslie Scalapino Award for Innovative Women Playwrights. Her piece Why I Love Being Black: Reaching Deep Into the Earth was published in The Indypendent, a New York City-based free newspaper and online news site. On March 8, 2017, she performed at the Washington Square Rally A Day Without Women Strike performing two long form protest poems. In 2017, her play The Great Dismal Swamp was short listed for the Leslie Scalapino Prize for Innovative Women Writers. That work was then Directed by Imani in the 2017 LadyFest at The Tank. In 2018, her one-woman show play Jubilee! (Women's Debt, Women's Revolution) premiered at THE TANK NYC.

In addition to writing for the performance stage, she is an arts and culture author for Shondaland (Shonda Rhime's media platform), Playboy, Broadway World, Broadway Black, Very Smart Brothers, CUNY Center for Humanities and B-Word Magazine.
