= Strand Theatre (Boston) =

Theater in Dorchester, Boston, Massachusetts, US

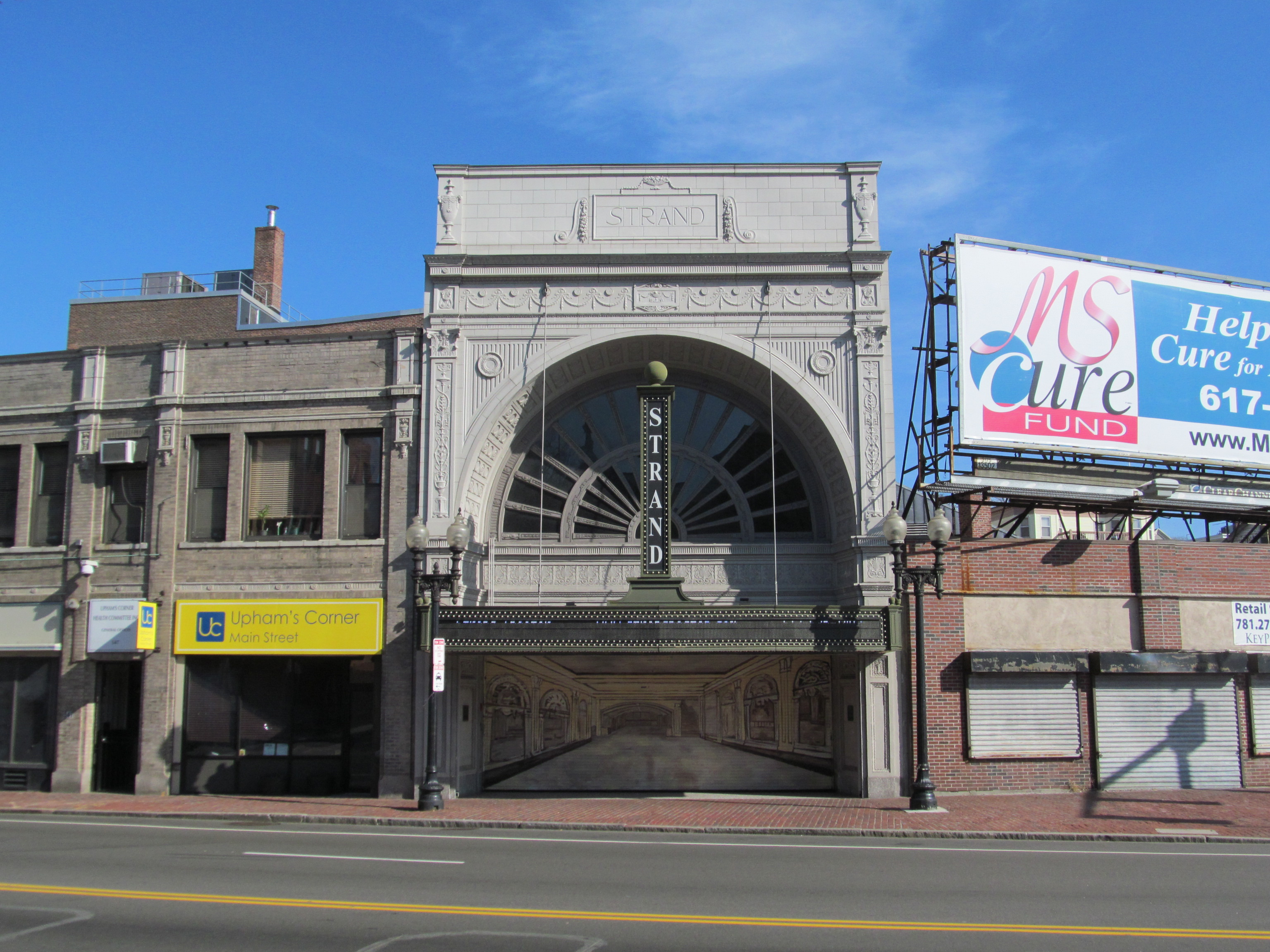
- Interactive map of Strand Theatre
- Address: 543 Columbia Road; Boston, Massachusetts
- Coordinates: 42°18′57″N 71°03′57″W
- Capacity: 1,381
- Type: Theatre

Construction
- Opened: November 11, 1918; 107 years ago

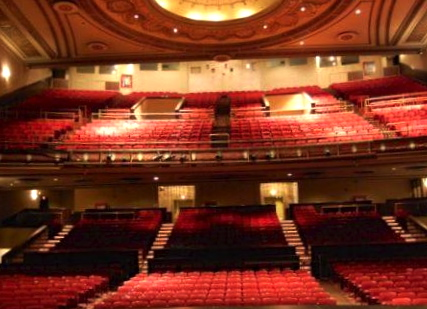
The restored interior

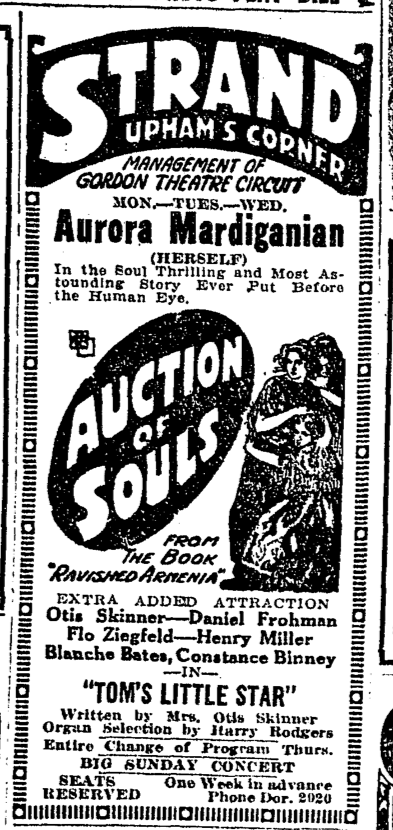
Advertisement, 1919, for Aurora Mardiganian's Ravished Armenia

Strand Theatre is a restored vaudeville house located in Uphams Corner in Dorchester, Boston, Massachusetts. It is owned by the City of Boston and managed by the Mayor's Office of Arts and Culture.

== History ==
The Strand was built in 1918 as a movie and vaudeville house. It opened on the evening of Armistice Day (November 11, 1918), billed as Dorchester's million-dollar movie palace, with a double feature: Queen of the Sea, starring Annette Kellermann, and Out of a Clear Sky, starring Marguerite Clark, with extra added attraction Miss Emilie Earle, the songstress. The theater was designed by Funk and Wilcox in Boston and built by McGahey and O'Connor. It boasted the first theater organ in New England, which reportedly cost $75,000.

It closed in 1974 due to disrepair, only to be reopened again in 1979 after the city of Boston made extensive renovations. The Strand was re-christened the M. Harriet McCormack Center for the Arts, named after the wife of Massachusetts Senator John W. McCormack. Both McCormack and his wife were ardent supporters of the arts. The McCormack Center opened with a series of jazz concerts, including the Duke Ellington Orchestra, Count Basie and His Orchestra, and Dizzie Gillespie. In the early 1980s, it featured a series of dance concerts, including regular performances by North Atlantic Ballet. It hosted Chaminade Opera Group in 1990 under the direction of Florence Louise Pettitt.

In 2005, the Strand closed for six months for repairs, including upgrading the electrical switch gear, replacing 300 seats in the orchestra section, and cleaning and repairing the remaining 1,100 seats. These repairs were made in part by a $6 million, four-year capital investment from the city of Boston.

In March 2006, the Strand closed its doors again for more improvements, including upgrading the safety and fire systems and renovating the box office and dressing rooms.

In July 2008, the Strand's stage floor and orchestra pit were replaced and repairs were made to the facade and marquee.

On January 9, 2007, Mayor Thomas Menino gave his State of the City Address from the stage of the Strand Theatre to help bring attention to restoration efforts and help revive the Strand's prominence in the city of Boston.

In August 2014, "a newly renovated visual arts gallery" opened with an exhibit honoring black veterans.
