= Takae Ohnishi =

- Born: Japan
- Occupation: Harpsichordist
- Instrument: Harpsichord
- Website: takaeohnishi.com

Takae Ohnishi is a Japanese harpsichordist who has performed extensively in the United States and Japan as a soloist, chamber musician and basso continuo player. She has appeared with numerous orchestras and at various venues in the United States and Japan, being a featured performer with the Atlantic Symphony Orchestra, Ishihara Hall 10th Anniversary Concert series and the Festival Internacional Cervantino in Mexico. She is also a music teacher and since 2007 has been an adjunct with the University of California, San Diego.

== Life and education ==
Ohnishi is a graduate of the Toho Gakuen School of Music. She went on to earn a masters in Music from the New England Conservatory of Music and a doctorate in Musical Arts from Stony Brook University, learning from teachers such as Arthur Haas, Peter Sykes, John Gibbons and Chiyoko Arita. She currently resides in San Diego.

== Career ==
Ohnishi has been the principal harpsichordist at the Atlantic Symphony Orchestra and in 2004, was the featured soloist at the Ishihara Hall 10th Anniversary Concert series. Her 2006 recital tour in Japan was broadcast nationally on NHK TV program Classic Ku-ra-bu. In 2015 she was featured in the Art of Music Concert Series at the San Diego Museum of Art, and in 2014 represented Japan as a soloist at the Festival Internacional Cervantino in Mexico.

Ohnishi has also performed as a soloist with the Berlin Philharmonic Scharoun Ensemble, the Gardner Chamber Orchestra (directed by Paula Robinson) the MIT Chapel, Swedenborg Chapel, the Boston Early Music Festival, Summer Institute for Contemporary Piano Performance and at the New England Conservatory of Music.

She has been a basso continuo player with Pro Arte Chamber Orchestra, Atlantic Symphony Orchestra and the Gardner Chamber Orchestra and the Boston University Baroque Orchestra. She has also performed with the Harvard Group for New Music and the Callithumpian Consort.

Ohnishi has also taught or lectured in Yantai, China, at the Toho Gakuen School of Music in Tokyo, as well as at the Early Music Festival in Fukuoka, Japan. She participated in the lecture series Historical Performance Practice, recorded and published by the Muramatsu Gakki Company in Tokyo. Since 2007 she has been an adjunct at the University of California, San Diego, teaching harpsichord and Baroque chamber music, and has also taught classes at the University of San Diego.

== Recognition ==
Ohnishi won her first major award at the International Early Music Harpsichord Competition in Japan, and her debut CD A Harpsichord Recital was chosen as an International Special Prized CD by Japanese music magazine Record Gei-jyu-tsu, in 2002. Ohnishi was also chosen to be a visiting artist from 2011 to 2012 at the American Academy in Rome.

== Repertoire and artistry ==
Ohnishi is a specialist in Baroque chamber music, but she also plays contemporary compositions as well, including ones from Asia. Her playing may use the inside of the harpsichord as much as the keyboard, by rubbing the strings with her palms or plucking them directly with her fingernails.

Referring to the Goldberg Variations recording, critic Benjamin Katz writes:

Ohnishi performs on a harpsichord built by Marc Ducomet, based on a Ruckers harpsichord that underwent a grand ravalment (a 17th Century instrument rebuilt to suit 18th Century tastes and repertoire). This fine instrument may have been the inspiration for some of Ohnishi's very French-sounding playing. She casts the 13th variation as a sensual French dance, complete with ports de voix (an appoggiatura-like ornament). Her 7th variation is played as a true canarie-gigue, a French dance with a snappy rhythm. Ohnishi's performance is admirably balanced. She communicates a great many of the varied affects in Bach's magnificent and justly popular Goldberg Variations.

== Recordings ==
Her performances has appeared on discs released by Mode and New World Records including her debut on A Harpsichord Recital (2004) . Ohnishi released her own album in 2012 on Bridge Records called Bach: Goldberg Variations.
