= Florence Louise Pettitt =

American opera singer

Florence Louise Staples
- Born: 1918; Massachusetts, U.S.
- Died: March 25, 2006 (aged 87–88)
- Education: New England Conservatory
- Occupation: Conductor
- Father: Charles Albert Staples

Louise Pettitt (1918 – March 25, 2006), born Florence Louise Staples, was one of the first American female opera conductors. For over forty years, she simultaneously served as orchestral conductor, dramatic director, and vocal director for the Chaminade Opera Group, which she founded in 1959. She promoted the growth of opera, and the advancement of many performers, ranging from amateur enthusiasts to internationally known professionals.

== Biography ==
Florence Louise Staples Pettitt was born in Massachusetts in 1918.

Her father—Charles Albert Staples—was a classical cellist who played in various New England orchestras. He took Louise to countless rehearsals during her childhood. The two also performed in local theaters.

She was a high school valedictorian and mastered the cello, like her father.

Pettitt came from a school with a prominent music program. Opera star Robert Rounseville and BSO violinist Sheldon Rotenberg and composer Ray Coniff were taught by her music teacher, who was a graduate of the New England Conservatory. Rounseville came back to honor and commemorate this teacher years later, in 1953, after making the internationally renowned film version of the "Tales of Hoffmann".

Even in high school, Louise Pettitt was promoting opera. She and her close friend, violinist Sheldon Rotenberg, tried to create an opera club at their school.

This enthusiasm for opera never left her.

As a young woman she shifted from cello to classical singing, and sought the best training available in Boston, New York City, and Providence, Rhode Island.

She trained with Gladys Childs Miller in Boston, Massachusetts, at the New England Conservatory from 1939 to 1941. Several of Miller's students went on to sing for the Vienna, Paris, and New York Metropolitan opera companies. One of them, Lillian Johnson, also came to sing for Louise in the Chaminade Opera Group. Louise also received instruction from Margaret Armstrong Gow of the Harvard Musical Association, Gertrude Erhardt, and others. She gradually became a leading soprano in the Boston area.

She sang professionally for many of Greater Boston's better known churches. One of her most prominent recurring performances was the regular weekly recital at the Isabella Stewart Gardner Museum. She later also sang at Tanglewood in the summers. And eventually, she became a member of the National Association of Teachers of Singing.

Although she devoted more hours over her long life to the production of opera than to her own singing career, and though she was eventually better known as a teacher and director, she always considered herself to be a singer, and continued to give solo vocal performances into the 1970s. During her many years of opera work, she devoted time in every week to her voice students, and she continued to sing, generally in support of Chaminade.

She also gradually gained some stage and drama experience in small local theatrical productions, and Gilbert and Sullivan; but in Massachusetts in the thirties and forties, there were few opportunities for young performers to try their hand at serious, fully staged opera.

The only fully staged operas in Boston then were generally done by New York's Met on tour at the Huntington Avenue site. Opera "scenes" were done at NEC by Goldovsky and others in Jordan Hall. There were very few opera companies in existence then, compared to the 1970s.

When Louise was finishing her studies at New England Conservatory in 1941, "..opera was then in eclipse...".

Goldovsky, when he arrived in 1942, found the opera situation in Boston "dormant". At Tanglewood, "the war shut down opera and nearly everything else..," though Goldovsky predicted "a growth in operatic productions similar to the great recent growth in symphonic performances and numbers of orchestras."

Louise performed in small theatre, opera scenes, and light opera nonetheless.

One of her earliest acting credits was a minor local production called Aunt Emma Sees It Through ( performed January 24, 1936 ).

When the faculty of Wheaton College ( Norton, Massachusetts ) formed its own Gilbert and Sullivan troupe in 1945, she became a perennial female lead for about 15 years, and never left the group.

Her later ability to conduct opera was most likely complemented and improved by her concurrent responsibility as conductor/director for that group, beginning in 1961.

She played soprano roles in other Gilbert and Sullivan productions in eastern Massachusetts in the 1940s and 1950s. She and her husband performed a consistent repertoire of G & S scenes professionally for various civic women's clubs (Foxboro, Framingham, Boston, etc ) under contract to "Flora Frame" of Boston in the 1950s and early 1960s.

She gave regular solo performances of arias in Boston and elsewhere. She performed in many area churches and other venues as a classical soloist in oratorios, light opera, and mixed programs. She sang at Old South Church, Trinity, St Paul's and many others.

This experience, along with her classical musicianship and vocal training prepared her for her eventual role as opera conductor.

When interest in opera grew in the late 1950s, her experience enabled her to make a vital, pioneering contribution.

== Boston Opera at a low point: 1933–1958 ==
In the depths of the great depression, the Chicago opera company stopped touring in Boston. This cancellation and the creation of new companies in the late 1950s form the bookends of a difficult period for opera in Boston.

The New England Conservatory had always been the backbone of local Boston opera companies in the twentieth century. But in the 1930s, the conservatory had great difficulty even maintaining a teaching schedule in opera. Wallace Goodrich tried in 1936 to create a school of opera there without success.

When Louise was in attendance at NEC ( 1939–1941 ), Goodrich was still trying to put together a program. Goodrich won approval to hire a conductor from London's famous Covent Garden in 1940, but this was a far cry from the robust opera department that he conceived. When Goldovsky was hired there in 1942 he was only paid $2,500 for the entire year and told to work part time. Fortunately for him, he was able to supplement his income as of 1946 by becoming "Mr. Opera," the voice that was broadcast every Saturday afternoon nationwide from New York by Texaco.

By hiring Goldovsky in 1942, upon the recommendation of Koussevitsky, Goodrich laid the foundations for the renaissance that bore fruit over the next 50 years. But the 1940s and 1950s were still lean years compared to the 1960s and onward.

The gas rationing of 1943 reduced Tanglewood to a simple red cross benefit concert in the Lennox public library, but this wasn't the entire reason for the leanness of opera in those years.

The fact that the axis of Germany, Austria, and Italy ( the native home of opera ) became America's foremost enemy in WWII may have been a factor. Jazz was seen as a more American style.

Public demand for opera seems to have been historically low in Boston in this period. The Metropolitan Opera cancelled its 1947 tour of Boston completely, and Goldovsky's company was the only local replacement available. During the war, NEC's "Popular Music Program" ( which focussed on the composition and arrangement of big band swing music ) garnered far more tuition revenue than opera instruction.

Opera was expensive, and money was tight in the 1930s and 1940s.

The Boston Opera House that had been built by Parkman Haven and Eben Jordan (who also built nearby NEC's Jordan Hall, Symphony Hall, and other great Boston buildings) on Boston's celebrated Culture Way was gradually lost to Boston's opera lovers over the years.

By the time Goldovsky and Koussevitsky were reinvigorating Boston high culture in the forties, the building had fallen into the hands of a theatre chain who saw no profit in its original purpose.

"The first spark of revival of interest in a potential resident company was kindled by the protean Boris Goldovsky with his New England Opera Company..."

He made an earnest effort at grand opera in the old hall with his Les Troyens, but he ultimately focussed on teaching and touring.

Goldovsky and the New England Conservatory's Opera aficionados were allowed some use of the hall, but it ultimately fell to the wrecking ball in 1958.

It stood at 343 Huntington Avenue, between Symphony Hall and the Museum of Fine Arts, near to New England Conservatory, Boston Conservatory, and the Handel and Haydn Society from 1908 to 1958.

One of the Boston Globe critics claimed that "Operapathy" had taken hold of Boston's citizens.

"Since the 1957 demolition [sic] of the old opera house, there had been talk of a new performing arts complex....All this had come to nothing."

"With the demise of the opera house, Boston was left with fading vaudeville houses and movie palaces, all with shallow stages and small orchestra pits- none ideal for opera."

The loss of the Opera House was a great blow to the Boston Opera scene, and put the efforts of Goldovsky and the others at great disadvantage. For about forty years afterward, the perennial fulfillment of Boston's operatic aspirations was accomplished by under-financed, under-accommodated devotees in shifting and uncertain circumstances.

After the demolition, "Goldovsky struggled on at Harvard's Loeb Theatre. There he staged his last three Boston productions...". After those few performances, Goldovsky then "retired to the relative leisure of his NEC visiting lectureship. The Conservatory began to fret about opera and 'its need for improvement'."

Chicago also had an "opera drought" of about eight years beginning in 1946.

Women were very important in overcoming these setbacks, but they faced some challenges.

When Caldwell successfully created and staged a new production of La Finta Giardiniera in Goldovsky's shop, she believed she was left out of the tour because she was a woman. By 1955, she had decided that in some departments, she could do a better job than her mentor.

The New York Times—long after Fritz Reiner helped Margaret Hillis become a conductor in Chicago—remarked that Hillis "established herself as a choral conductor ... because there were virtually no orchestral conducting opportunities for women when she began her career in the 1950s" ( Margaret Hillis' New York Times obituary ).

Hillis was a choral conductor with the New York City Opera prior to becoming the founder and conductor of the Chicago Symphony Chorus in 1957.

Carol Fox founded the new Chicago Lyric Opera in 1954.

At about this time (c. 1958), Sarah Caldwell started the Opera Company of Boston. The first indoor performance of the company was in 1959. She claimed—in her memoir—that Goldovsky's "New England Opera Theatre" had been reduced to one sad production of Don Giovanni.

Louise Pettitt started the Chaminade Opera Group at the same time, and the first performance was in the fall of 1959. The Chaminade goals were similar to those of Santa Fe. They established a scholarship to promote young talent.

The Santa Fe opera was started in 1956/57 with the explicit goal of promoting the genre and developing a large pool of experienced performers.

For some of these women, Tanglewood was a common thread. This summer institution of the arts was created by wealthy women of the Berkshires who invited Koussevitsky in. The famous 'shed' was established when a woman leading the organization called for donations during a rain-drenched concert. The land was donated by women. People who supported the development of women as conductors found opportunities there to foster that development.

Caldwell had been a protégé of Boris Goldovsky for several years prior, and of course their efforts were under the shadow of BSO's great Serge Koussevitsky, the European impresario who created Tanglewood, and who attracted so many great artists and performers to both Tanglewood and Boston. Louise sang many times at Tanglewood over the years, and sent her daughter to study under Goldovsky in 1961.

Tanglewood allowed women who sought to become leaders in the field of music, and men who respected them, to work together in a non commercial setting where artistic development was the primary concern.

Margaret Hillis established a Tanglewood Alumni chorus in 1950, and her conducting career was furthered by Fritz Reiner in Chicago.

Aaron Copland, who was a student of Nadia Boulanger in the 1920s, helped Caldwell develop at Tanglewood in the 1950s. Copland chose Boulanger to be his composition instructor, and he became leader of the composition department at Tanglewood. Leonard Bernstein, who worked closely with Caldwell at Tanglewood in the 1950s, and became a close friend of Copland's in the 1930s, became a mentor to JoAnn Falletta.

It was at Tanglewood that Goldovsky let Caldwell substitute conduct for him when he was hospitalized for an illness in the early postwar era. He ran the opera department at Tanglewood from the war years until Leinsdorf took over as BSO conductor in about 1961.

Pettitt's family was sympathetic to the idea of women directors. Her son in law studied under Boulanger in Boston in the early sixties, and her husband and brother in law ( a music professor at Boston's Emerson College ) were very supportive. Her brother in law was for many years a keyboardist at Tanglewood. He was also Caldwell's assistant in the opera department, 1950–52, and helped Alice Taylor create the Oakland Opera in the 1970s.

Pettitt's hometown friend, Robert Rounseville, who also studied at Tanglewood, was a lifelong friend and supporter of Mrs Pettitt. He starred in the world premiere of Stravinsky's "Rake's Progress" in Europe, before Caldwell brought Stravinsky to BU to conduct the US premiere. Another male advocate in the Boston Symphony Orchestra / Tanglewood community was Pettitt's lifelong friend, violinist Sheldon Rotenberg, who was hired by Koussevitsky in 1948, and stayed with the BSO until 1991. He was brought to Tanglewood from Leopold Stokowski's National Youth Orchestra.

One other factor to mention is the cold war. The launching of Sputnik epitomized a new cold war rivalry that extended to culture and even to classical music. Van Cliburn's 1958 victory in the first quadrennial Tchaikovsky piano competition in Moscow won him a ticker tape parade in Manhattan, among other things. The American impulse to excel in the arts was stimulated in the late 1950s in part by Soviet triumphalism. This was part of the backdrop to the founding of the Chaminade Opera Group, but the very few women who conducted opera in America in the 1950s faced other challenges that were more immediate, and more cumbersome.

== Founding of Chaminade Opera Group ==
In 1958, a year before the founding of the company, Mrs Pettitt directed a limited production of Mozart's "Cosi Fan Tutte" at a small venue, with double piano accompaniment instead of orchestra. The following year she commenced the first official season of the new company with Humperdinck's Hänsel und Gretel.

During her long tenure Mrs Pettitt served in three roles: orchestra conductor, vocal director and dramatic director. She probably did so for a longer, unbroken period than any other American woman. The difficulty of this challenge was illustrated by Boris Goldovsky, who pursued a career as a conductor before becoming an opera lover. In his first conducting class with Fritz Reiner, he was confronted with the notion that an art form he despised (Goldovsky as a student loathed opera) comprised the most difficult and demanding form of conducting.

Reiner reportedly said to Goldovsky in his conducting class at the Curtis Institute: "Anybody can beat time evenly and it's nothing to be proud of...I'm not going to waste your time and mine teaching you easy things. What I'm going to do first is teach you how to conduct operatic recitatives. Because until you've conducted opera, you don't know what conducting really is" (see page 155 "My Road to Opera" by Goldovsky).

Reiner forced Goldovsky to coach the opera singers at Curtis in operatic repertoire, the better to prepare him to be a great conductor. And Goldovsky dedicated his book to three men: Fritz Reiner, Ernst Lert, and Serge Koussevitzky.

For Mrs Pettitt to have discharged all three responsibilities (orchestra director, dramatic director, singing director) for any extended period is an achievement.

Thirty two years after the founding of Chaminade, the Taunton Daily Gazette wrote that "Long before Sarah Caldwell in Boston or New York's Beverly Sills directed opera companies, there was Louise Pettitt in Attleboro" (Taunton Daily Gazette, Sat Feb 23, 1991, by Nancy C Doyle ). This praise was half right.

Louise Pettitt preceded Beverly Sills by many years. Sills took over as General Director of the NYCO in 1980.

But Louise was a contemporary of Caldwell.

In Chicago, beginning in 1954, Fox was running the Lyric Opera and engaging artists like Maria Callas. Few women in the US were running opera companies when Mrs Pettitt took the helm of Chaminade, performing both as conductor and director. Caldwell herself often did not conduct the orchestra in her independent productions.

There were few opera companies at all in the United States in 1958. Of those, there were few founded by women, and of those, there were fewer still with a woman serving as both conductor and dramatic director. She was certainly a leader, and a pioneer.

The New England Conservatory's alumni notes claim that Caldwell was "the second woman ever to conduct the New York Philharmonic (1974), and the third woman ever to lead an American opera company" (see Caldwell alumni profile). Certainly the foundation of a successful opera company in the 1950s by an American woman would have been highly unusual.

The works chosen by Mrs Pettitt for her first four seasons did not stray from the standard canon of favorites. After Hänsel und Gretel, a well-known piece then—with which she and her audience were familiar—the next three seasons were devoted to Mozart's Cosi Fan Tutte, Magic Flute, and Marriage of Figaro.

Her choices later become more daring and ambitious.

== 1964–1990: innovation and exploration ==
By 1964, Mrs Pettitt was able to incorporate members of the Boston Ballet company into her production of Song Of Norway, an opera about the famous European composer, Edvard Grieg (Providence Journal, November 8, 1964). Her daughter sang that same year with Joan Sutherland in Caldwell's production of "I Puritani" in Boston. At this point, international stars started coming to Boston, including Renata Tebaldi, Plácido Domingo, and Sutherland.

Her later productions still included works by Mozart, Puccini, Verdi, Donizetti, Johann Strauss, in addition to Offenbach, Bizet, Lehár, and Britten. She gradually opened the repertoire to less familiar composers, like Boito, Smetana, Massenet, Gounod and others.

After more than a dozen years of experience, the Chaminade Opera Group was reaching new heights in the 1970s, recruiting well established professionals and receiving praise in the press. Turnout was often standing room only, and the group was forced to add extra performances to accommodate the rising interest (Attleboro Sun Chronicle, December 7, 1973). The frequent participation of a photogenic young Miss Massachusetts named Deborah O'Brien may have also drawn some of the additional interest.

In 1977, Greater Boston's Patriot Ledger newspaper compared Mrs Pettitt's production of Mephistopheles favorably to those of Sarah Caldwell (The Patriot Ledger, Wednesday December 14, 1977). Critic Sue Cromwell wrote that "Sarah Caldwell fans, presumably waiting patiently for the Opera Company of Boston's new season to begin, missed the kind of performance that is their meat and drink", adding that "Sarah's seasoned fans would have torn the house down." John Bates, of Caldwell's "Opera Company of Boston" served as Pettitt's young "Wagner" in the Chaminade effort. Cromwell noted that "...the same kinds of strengths and weaknesses appear to prevail with both the professional Caldwell company and the semi-pro Chaminade."

Over the years, several people who sang for her company also sang for the Caldwell company.

Mrs Pettitt's own daughter Pamela sang with both the Caldwell Company and Chaminade Opera Group.

Peter Feldman, who had toured six times with the Goldovsky Institute (see Boris Goldovsky), played the title role in Chaminade's Mephistopheles, and personally translated his entire role from the original Italian libretto for the Chaminade production. Mr Bates served in several Caldwell and Pettitt productions.

In 1985 and 1987, Louise directed baritone Donald Wilkinson, who now teaches at Harvard and MIT. His experience clearly shows the value of her company regionally as a promoter of opera.

These achievements were valuable to the opera community at large, but many of the early promoters of opera, like Goldovsky and Pettitt, gradually found themselves surrounded by well financed competitors.

By the late 1970s, the number of opera companies in the country had vastly increased, to the point that the Metropolitan Opera Guild tried to conduct a sort of census. The opera 'drought' of the 1940s was clearly long gone. The Chaminade Opera Group was now one of many companies.

== Boston Opera in crisis of 1990: Pettitt temporarily takes mantle from the faltering Caldwell ==
Sarah Caldwell's Boston company gradually fell apart, and by 1990, Tanglewood's opera department had long since been pared back by the BSO trustees. Eric Leinsdorf had fired Goldovsky from Tanglewood in the early 1960s, and abolished the opera department there. It wasn't until the mid-1990s that Seiji Ozawa re-introduced opera at Tanglewood on an equal basis with the other genres.

"Sarah's 1989 production of Leonard Bernstein's Mass was her last effort that could be ranked as a piece of innovative theater,...".

"Although buoyed by the success of Mass, by the time 1990 rolled around, Sarah was on the cusp of her last Boston season, her company tottering on the edge of financial ruin with little hope of rescue."

See an explanation of her difficulties in "Sarah Caldwell, Indomitable Director of the Opera Company of Boston, Dies at 82" article by Anthony Tommasini, New York Times March 25, 2006.

The last performance of her company in its own theater was June 17, 1990. Her theatre was shuttered for building code violations in December 1990.

By this point Mrs Pettitt's company—a more enduring institution—found itself thriving in Boston. In January of that year, the Boston Opera Company (not Caldwell's "Opera Company of Boston") featured Mrs Pettitt's production of Bizet's Pearl Fishers in the Strand Theater in Boston.

With the support of the City of Boston, the federal Economic Development Administration, and Community Development Block Grant money, the Strand was saved and renovated in the late 1970s. While Boston City Hall backed revitalization of the Strand, with help from community groups, it has not been primarily used as an opera house since the re-opening. But when the Caldwell organization faltered, it provided shelter to the Chaminade group.

Richard Dyer, the eminent Globe columnist who presided at New England Conservatory's 2008 centennial of Boris Goldovsky (recounting tales of Boston Opera from the 1940s, 1950s and 1960s along with stars Phyllis Curtin, George Shirley, Sherrill Milnes, Rosalind Elias, Justino Diaz and John Moriarty) lionized Mrs. Pettitt and her company for their efforts in the 1990 production.

Among the professional performers onstage in the 1990 Pettitt production was Deborah Sasson (ibid). Deborah was born in Boston and having worked with Mrs. Pettitt and Seiji Ozawa, she has moved on to become a celebrated European performer.

Pettitt's collaborators that year included Randall J. Kulunis, who at the time saw the failure of the Caldwell efforts and the loss of Caldwell's venue as an opportunity to resurrect the original plans of the original Huntington Street Boston Opera House (1909) and put fully staged opera once again in a proper Boston hall. Pettitt's company cooperated in this noble venture, although no resurrection occurred. Dyer hailed the effort.

In the narrative of Boston Opera history, she continued using Boston singers in her productions for many more years and thus continued to draw on the Boston Opera community for talent, ticket sales, inspiration, and collaboration.

She and her Chaminade Opera Group continue staging operas long after the folding of Caldwell's company, but they also established a broad repertoire of oratorio works, including Mendelssohn's Elijah, Carl Orff's Carmina Burana, and many famous and lesser known requiems and masses. Her favorite requiem was Brahms' German Requiem and Chaminade Opera Group singers performed it several times as an oratorio piece under the direction of Mrs Pettitt. During this time, they also maintained Chaminade's opera scholarship.

Anthony Tommasini, a critic from the New York Times, reviewed a production of hers in the 1990s and found it "charming, but riddled with weakness". The semi-professional tenor had a weak high range. The woodwinds seemed "under-rehearsed."[Source needed] Mr. Tommasini did not recommend that particular show to his readers.

By the time Mrs. Pettitt was in her late seventies, American opera had shifted; the catalogues of companies, stars, venues and repertoires had become lengthy. She had always provided probative opportunity on evidence of good faith where she witnessed promising talent in league with high enthusiasm. In the case of Sasson and others, the opportunity was well requited. She worked for a nonprofit, in the interest of promoting unproven ability; the results of her efforts differing form the standards of the Metropolitan Opera, or La Scala. Having pioneered the introduction of fully staged opera into the mainstream of civic life in America without supportive academic incubation (like by Boston University for Caldwell) or prolonged mentoring (like Goldovsky for Caldwell) during a time when American women were effectively barred from leadership, Mrs. Pettitt found herself among competitors she sought to engender (much like Goldovsky who made such a case in his memoir), refusing to deny opportunity to the unproven, and the unfinished. Mr. Tommasini sought to judge her within the facile intellectual confines of technical skill.

Although age and illness (particularly that of her lifelong love George Arthur Pettitt) gradually began to affect her productiveness in the new millennium, she maintained an incontrovertible optimism and resolve. Her teaching and rehearsal schedules exhibited the same relentless diligence as previously. On the day she died, she was awaiting several voice students, and was three weeks into a six-week schedule for an upcoming choral concert (supporting Chaminade).

She died on March 25, 2006, at her home in Massachusetts, about ten weeks after her partner of 65 years. She outlived Sarah Caldwell—a very similar woman—by exactly two days. An archive of her work and that of the Chaminade Opera Group is being assembled under the auspices of Wheaton College, Norton Massachusetts.

== Her conducting credits with Chaminade include the following ==
- The Marriage of Figaro by Mozart
- The Magic Flute by Mozart
- Così Fan Tutte by Mozart
- Die Fledermaus by Strauss
- Eine Nacht in Venedig (A Night in Venice) by Strauss
- The Tales of Hoffmann by Offenbach
- La Périchole by Offenbach
- La Traviata by Verdi
- Otello by Verdi
- The Pearl Fishers by Bizet
- Carmen by Bizet
- The Gondoliers by Gilbert & Sullivan
- The Mikado by Gilbert & Sullivan
- Turandot by Puccini
- L'Elisir D'Amore by Donizetti
- The Merry Widow by Lehár
- The Bartered Bride by Smetana
- Manon by Massenet
- Mephistopheles by Boito
- Faust by Gounod
- The Ballad of Baby Doe by Moore
- The Merry Wives of Windsor by Nicolai
- The Song of Norway by Robert Wright and George Forrest (see Grieg)
- Hansel and Gretel by Humperdinck

== Chaminade actors include ==
Deborah Sasson. Deborah was born in Boston and studied at Oberlin Conservatory. She sang with the New York Metropolitan Opera early in her career. She had her Broadway debut in Show Boat. She was introduced to the Hamburg Staatsoper by Leonard Bernstein, and as her website says: "Das war der Beginn ihrer deutsche Karriere." She has sung at Vienna, in Rio de Janeiro, Los Angeles and Venice, inter alia; She sang with the London Symphony Orchestra.

She has appeared in numerous European television specials, alongside José Carreras and others. Among the highlights of her career, she mentions performing in Japan with Seiji Ozawa, and performing Mahler's 8th Symphony under his direction with the Boston Symphony Orchestra at Carnegie Hall in New York.

Donald Wilkinson performed for the Chaminade Opera Group in 1985 and 1987, early in his opera career. He has performed under the direction of Seiji Ozawa with the Boston Symphony Orchestra. He was awarded a Tanglewood fellowship. He teaches voice at Harvard and MIT. He has sung across Europe.

Benjamin Cox, Jeanine Kelley, and Jack Bates were all from Caldwell's Opera Company of Boston;

William "Bill" Cashman performed professionally in Caldwell's Opera Company of Boston (January 1973 – May 1979) and in Pettitt's Chaminade Opera Group. He also performed at the Louise Pettitt memorial concert.

Jon Berberian trained with the New York City Opera.

Peter Feldman. Peter toured six seasons with Boris Goldovsky of Goldovsky Institute; He studied at Boston University's opera program 1957–1961. He performed under stage direction by Sarah Caldwell and Boris Goldovsky. He performed at the New York City Opera, among others.

James Van Der Post, who has sung opera in companies across the United States and in Europe;

Randall Kulunis. Randall studied at the Boston Conservatory Opera Department under legendary mentor John Moriarty, and at New England Conservatory under Boris Goldovsky. He and his brother at one point recovered the plans of the old Boston Opera House (1909), intending to rebuild it.

Deborah O'Brien (the 1971 Miss Massachusetts, and an associate of the Opera Company of Boston);

Michael Popowich of the Santa Fe Opera.

Michael Duarte, a longtime friend and collaborator of Mrs Pettitt's, and a lead in several of her productions, is expected to take her place within Chaminade Opera as director.
