= Eric Rosenblith =

Classical violinist

- Born: December 11, 1920
- Died: December 16, 2010 (aged 90)
- Education: Ecole Normale de Musique de Paris
- Occupation: Violinist

Eric Rosenblith (December 11, 1920 – December 16, 2010) was an Austrian-born American violinist. He was the former concertmaster of the Indianapolis and San Antonio Symphony Orchestras, and had performed as a soloist and chamber musician throughout North America, Europe, and Asia. Rosenblith served as chairman of the New England Conservatory's string department for more than twenty-five years and was a faculty member of the Hartt School as well as the Longy School of Music in Cambridge, Massachusetts. He was a visiting professor at the University of Kansas.

Rosenblith received the Licence de Concert from the Ecole Normale de Musique de Paris. He was awarded an honorary D.Mus. from the New England Conservatory. His violin teachers included: Jacques Thibaud and José Figueroa in Paris, Carl Flesch in London, and Bronislaw Huberman in New York.

Rosenblith premiered and recorded many new works by American composers including David Stock, George Crumb, Alan Lighty, and Lucia Dlugachevsky. Rosenblith edited and translated the newly revised Art of Violin Playing by Carl Flesch. He founded and served as the artistic director of the International Musical Arts Institute of Fryeburg, Maine. Rosenblith regularly gave master classes in the United States, the United Kingdom, Korea, Taiwan, and the People's Republic of China.

Among Rosenblith's students are world-renowned composer Lauren Bernofsky, Xin Ding of the Boston Symphony Orchestra, Chiun-Teng Cheng of the Cincinnati Symphony Orchestra, and Janice Tucker Rhoda, author of The ABCs of Strings.

== Recordings ==
Rosenblith released recordings on Columbia, CRI, Crest, and Parjo. Among his releases was Complete Works for Violin and Piano by Johannes Brahms with pianist Heng-Jin Park.

His violin interpretation of Lucia Dlugachevsky’s Chiaroscuro (which premiered at the Tanglewood festival in 1992) has been included in several university recital programs.

== Bibliography ==
- Carl Flesch (1873–1944), The Art Of Violin Playing, Books 1 & 2 Translated & Edited by Eric Rosenblith. New York: Carl Fischer Music, ISBN 0-8258-2822-8
- Eric Rosenblith (1920-2010), "‘Ah, You Play the Violin…': Thoughts Along the Path to Musical Artistry," New York: Carl Fischer Music, ISBN 0825882842

ISBN 978-0825882845

- "Violinist and pedagogue Eric Rosenblith dies," The Strad, May 23, 2010, https://web.archive.org/web/20150915054553/http://www.thestrad.com/cpt-latests/violinist-and-pedagogue-eric-rosenblith-dies/
