= Cora Scott Pope =

American activist, professor, writer and real estate developer

Cora Scott Pond Pope
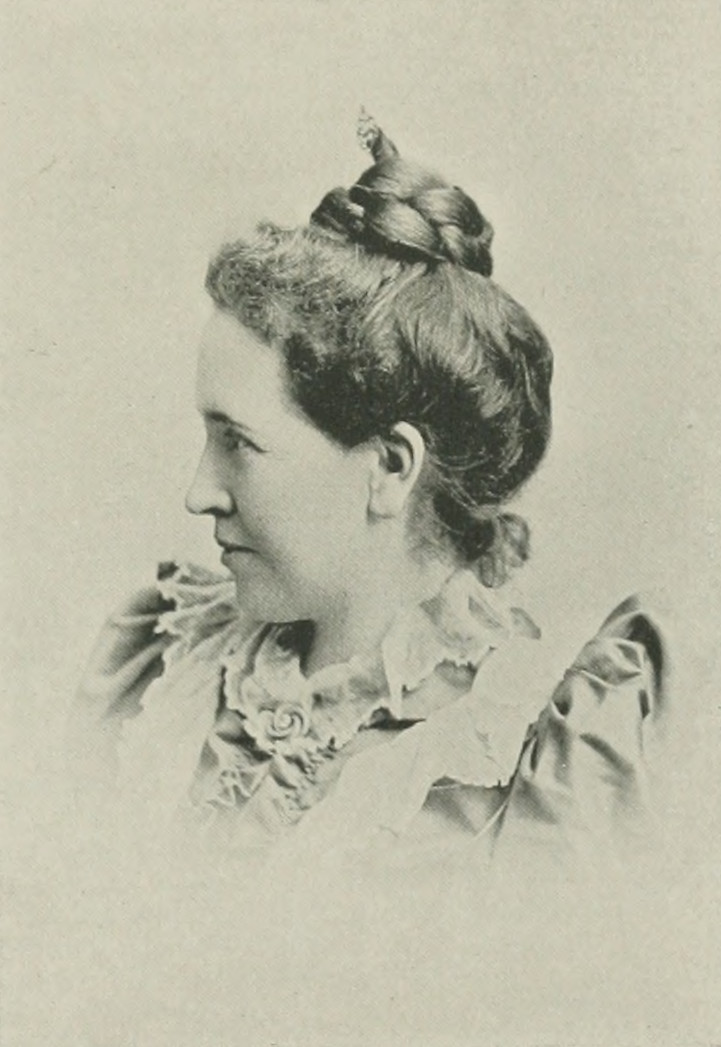
- "A Woman of the Century"
- Born: Cora Scott Pond; March 2, 1856; Sheboygan, Wisconsin
- Died: Unknown; POD: unknown
- Education: University of Wisconsin
- Occupations: professor; playwright; real estate developer; women's right activist; suffragist; prohibitionist
- Spouse: John T. Pope (m. 1891; div. 1924)
- Children: 3 stepsons
- Relatives: Winfield Scott (second cousin)
- Writing career
- Language: English
- Notable work: "The National Pageant"

Cora Scott Pope (née Pond; March 2, 1856 – unknown) was an American professor, a scenario writer, and a real estate developer. She was also a women’s rights activist, suffragist, and militant prohibitionist.

Trained in oratory, she taught in the New England Conservatory of Music in Boston, before taking on suffrage work. In Massachusetts, she organized 87 woman's suffrage leagues, speaking in public and raising money to carry on the work in that state. As a fundraiser, she originated a dramatic entertainment called "The National Pageant", which she gave with great success for the benefit of the various societies of women. With Charlotte Harris Allen and Aimee Stanwood Bigelow, Pond was also editor and publisher of the children's monthly magazine, The Young Idea.

== Early life and education ==
Cora Scott Pond was born in Sheboygan, Wisconsin, March 2, 1856. She was a second cousin on her father's side of General Winfield Scott. Her father, Levi Wesley Pond (1827–1908) born in Calais, Maine, was a successful inventor of machinery and booms for milling and logging purposes, and one of the early pioneers in Wisconsin. Her mother, Mary Ann (McGowan) pond (1835–1913), was born in Saint John, New Brunswick. After they married, they went immediately to the West, settling first in Sheboygan, in 1850, and then moved to Two Rivers, Wabasha County, Minnesota, Chippewa Falls, Wisconsin, and finally settled in Eau Claire, Wisconsin, Cora had many siblings including, Mary Jane, Charles, Emeline, Edward E., Edward W., George W., Eugene L., Gilbert A., Katherine, and Gilbert A. II.

She attended the public schools regularly and added to her already robust constitution by outdoor games. There were no books or libraries in the town, and from 15 to 21 years of age, she devoted herself to music and social Interests. She desired above all things to finish her education in the University of Wisconsin. The question of expense was a crucial one, with so large a family to support, but at the age of 22, Pond was able to enter the state university. She lacked particular interest in mathematics or foreign languages, but whatever related to English and to history, literature, rhetoric and oratory did interest her.

She decided to fit herself as a teacher of oratory and, not wishing to finish any prescribed course in the university, after studying there three years, she set out for Boston alone in 1880, one of the first young women in her city, in those days, to go away from home, and adopt a profession. She entered the department of oratory of the New England Conservatory of Music. In 1883, she was graduated first in her class.

== Career ==
For one year after graduation, she taught with her professor in the conservatory. While there, she was interested in woman's work at the polls, in woman suffrage and temperance, and because of special work done alone in the hardest ward of the city, where no woman had ever labored before, she was invited by Lucy Stone to help them organize the State of Massachusetts for woman suffrage. Pond had intended to teach for ten years and then go West and take up the work for women, but she decided to accept the proposition. She continued the work and organized 87 woman suffrage leagues in Massachusetts, more than had ever been organized before, arranged lectures, spoke in the meetings and raised money to carry on the State work for six years.

Although engaged in that work, she was interested in every reform. Pond's first great effort in raising money was in 1887, when she organized a woman suffrage bazaar. It was held in Music Hall, Boston, for one week. Over US$6,000 were cleared. After that, most of her time was spent in raising money for State work.

While teaching in the conservatory, Pond arranged five-minute sketches from Charles Dickens, William Shakespeare, and other authors, and presented them with her scholars to the public in the conservatory.

In 1886, Pond began investing in real estate in Los Angeles, California. She was traveling in that state in 1897 and also went to Portland, Oregon, Tacoma, Washington, and Seattle, Washington.

In 1889, she arranged national historical events in the same as her conservatory oratory work to raise money for the State suffrage work. The inventive mind of her father showed itself in that. The pictures for dramatic expression arranged themselves, in one evening, spontaneously in her mind. She called it "The National Pageant Tableaux of American History" and copyrighted her programme. The idea did not initially have an enthusiastic reception by some of the prominent women of Boston. Two only stood by her and said "Go on". The National Pageant was given in Hollis Street Theatre, May 9, 1889. The house was crowded at US$2 per ticket. It was a grand success. Over US$1,000 were cleared at one matinee performance.

In 1890, at the urging of Mary A. Livermore, who had always been to Pond as a godmother in her Boston work, and by Amanda Melvina Lougee, a prominent business woman of Boston, Pond gave up her State work, and devoted herself to "The National Pageant", giving it for various charities and societies of women to help them raise money to carry on their work. Pond made her venture and carried it into the large cities of the country, and gave one performance each month for local societies, and raised many thousands of dollars for charitable purposes. She gave it in Chicago, in the Auditorium, the first historical work given after the decision by U.S. Congress to hold the Columbian Exposition in that city. In one night US$6,250 were cleared. For 15 years, she gave these entertainments in most of the large cities of the United States.

While in Chicago, Pond met a businessman, John T. Pope, who assisted her in the pageant for over a year. They were married December 20, 1891, and made their home in Chicago. He had three young sons, (Lester, b. 1883; Marshall, b. 1885; Clarence, b. 1889), who lived with Pond's mother for 12 years, while Mr. and Mrs. Pope continued the work that Cora had begun.

In 1905, the Popes removed to Los Angeles where she continued her real estate work. In what is now the Highland Park neighborhood, she purchased land from the Garvanza Land Co., named it Mt. Angelus, subdivided it, and sold lots to individuals. She also owned a home nearby in the Garvanza neighborhood with Anna Howard Shaw before they joined Susan B. Anthony in Los Angeles's suffrage movement.

In 1924, Pond-Pope divorced her husband on the grounds that she maintained a home for him and his three minor children by a former marriage until August, 1917, paying all the expenses from an income she received from her labors.

== Death ==
Her year of death is unknown, but occurred in 1932 or later.
