= Maria Spacagna =

American soprano

Maria Spacagna (born 1946) is an American soprano; Born in Providence, Rhode Island, Spacagna trained at the New England Conservatory of Music in Boston, Massachusetts, where she earned both her bachelor's and master's degrees. Spacagna had her Metropolitan Opera House debut as Luisa Miller in Luisa Miller opposite Luciano Pavarotti in 1991, and performed in 13 productions there. She played the title role in Madame Butterfly on the 1995 Vox Records recording, the first-ever full recording of the opera. In 1997, Spacagna won the top prize at the Verdi Competition in Bussetto, Italy. She was inducted to the Rhode Island Heritage Hall of Fame that year.

Spacagna went on to teach, and she is now a professor of voice at Carnegie Mellon.
