= Lauren Bernofsky =

American composer

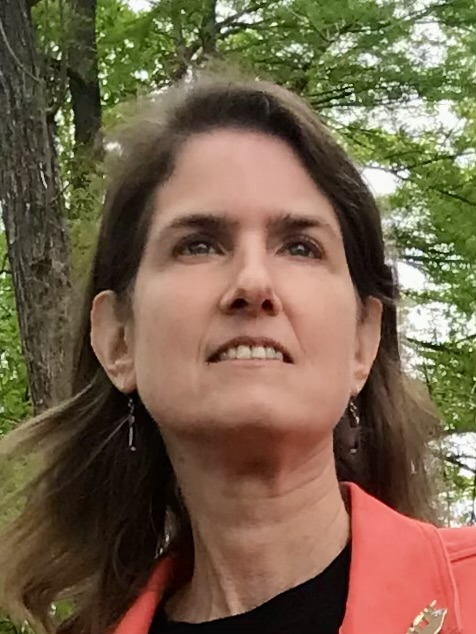
- Bernofsky (circa 2021)
- Born: September 25, 1967 (age 58); Rochester, Minnesota, U.S.
- Education: The Hartt School; New England Conservatory of Music; Boston University (DMA)
- Website: laurenbernofsky.com

Lauren Bernofsky is an American composer of solo, chamber and choral music as well as larger-scale works for orchestra, film, musical, opera, and ballet. Trained as a violinist, she is particularly known for her writing for brass and winds. Her Concerto for Trumpet and Orchestra is frequently performed as audition and recital repertoire and has been featured in the journal of the International Trumpet Guild; it was also the subject of a doctoral dissertation. Her piece "Sonatine" for flute and piano won the National Flute Association's Newly Published Music Competition. She has taught at the Peabody Institute.

== Life and career ==
Bernofsky studied at the New Orleans Center for Creative Arts (NOCCA), The Hartt School, where she was a student of Eric Rosenblith, New England Conservatory of Music, and at Boston University, where she studied under Lukas Foss. While at NOCCA, she met and took lessons from Ellis Marsalis.

Bernofsky's music is generally tonal/modal, showing influences of Shostakovich, Ravel, Prokofiev, klezmer, and other Eastern European folk music, and often features soaring melodic lines set over syncopation-fueled rhythms and contemporary/experimental approaches to chord structure. Her Trio for Brass has been described as having "poignant harmonies and infectious rhythms." Some of her pieces are environmentally-themed, such as the string quartet Anacostia Journal, written during a residency with the Earth Conservation Corps as part of a project to protect and restore the Anacostia River. Her choral work Prayer of Shantideva was performed for the Dalai Lama of Tibet, who was said to be "enchanted" by the work. Her Haubrich Suite for brass sextet, commissioned by the International Women’s Brass Conference, responds to works of visual art condemned as "degenerate" under National Socialism in Germany.

Bernofsky's ecological-futuristic chamber opera for children, Mooch the Magnificent, with a libretto by Scott Russell Sanders based on his novel The Engineer of Beasts, won the Opera Puppets Award at Boston Metro Opera. The opera had its orchestral premiere (in Spanish translation) as part of the Festival Internacional de Artes Vivas in Loja, Ecuador, in 2022. It is set to be performed at Vanderbilt University's Blair School of Music in 2026.

In 2023, the first act of her new opera The Mensch, about unsung Holocaust hero Anton Schmid, was premiered at Indiana University.

== Selected works ==
=== Orchestral ===
- Concerto for Trumpet and Orchestra (1998)
- Five Songs on Poems of Robert Herrick (1999)
- Three Portraits of a Witch (2005)
  - commissioned by the Harford Ballet

=== Opera ===
- The Mensch (2026)
- Mooch the Magnificent (2012)
- Rufus and Rita (2018)

=== Choral ===
- The Tiger (2002)
- Hope Is the Thing with Feathers (2017)
- O Cosmos (from The Vonnegut Requiem) (2018)
  - commissioned by Voces Novae

=== Chamber ===
- The Devil’s Dermish (trombone and piano, 1994)
- Trio for Brass (2002)
- Anacostia Journal (string quartet, 2003)
  - commissioned by American Composers Forum
- Two Latin Dances (various instrumentation, 2015)
