= Robert Rounseville =

American opera singer (1914–1974)

Robert Rounseville (25 March 1914 – 6 August 1974) was an American actor and tenor, who appeared in opera, operetta, Broadway musicals, and motion pictures.

== Career ==
Rounseville was born in Attleboro, Massachusetts. He made his Broadway debut in a small role in the Richard Rodgers and Lorenz Hart musical Babes in Arms, then appeared in other musicals in the chorus. Between 1943 and 1945, Rounseville was billed as Robert Field, using his middle name as a surname. He again played small roles on Broadway, in a revival of The Merry Widow and in Up in Central Park. Rounseville appeared several times on television, as well as in two films.

In 1949, he was a soloist with the Naumburg Orchestral Concerts, in the Naumburg Bandshell, Central Park, in the summer series.

Yet, he is perhaps best known to opera buffs for starring in the role of Hoffmann in Michael Powell and Emeric Pressburger's film of Jacques Offenbach's The Tales of Hoffmann (1951), the first color film of an opera to use genuinely cinematic techniques (as opposed to filming a performance on stage). That same year, he was also the first Tom Rakewell, in the world premiere of Igor Stravinsky's opera The Rake's Progress, at La Fenice; his co-stars were Elisabeth Schwarzkopf and Jennie Tourel. In October 1951 he portrayed Channon in the world premiere of David Tamkin's The Dybbuk at the New York City Opera with Patricia Neway portraying his love interest.

In 1956, Rounseville played both his best-remembered screen role and one of his most memorable stage roles. In the film Carousel, an adaptation of the Rodgers and Hammerstein stage musical, he portrayed the snobbish fisherman Mr. Snow, opposite Barbara Ruick as Carrie Pipperidge. In December of that year, he opened on Broadway in the original production of Leonard Bernstein's Candide, playing the title role opposite Barbara Cook as Cunegonde.

In 1960, he appeared in the role of Nanki-Poo in a "Bell Telephone Hour" television abridgement of Gilbert and Sullivan's opera The Mikado, starring Groucho Marx as Ko-Ko, the executioner.

He was also an occasional guest star on the TV version of the musical series "The Voice of Firestone".

On television's NBC Opera Theatre, he sang the role of Don José in an English-language version of Carmen (1953) and the Chevalier de la Force in the first American television production (also in English) of Dialogues of the Carmelites (1957). Soprano Leontyne Price made an early television appearance in the latter work.

In 1969, he starred on National Educational Television in the American premiere of Leoš Janáček's last opera From the House of the Dead, based on Fyodor Dostoyevsky's novel.

Rounseville also made a few studio cast recordings of Broadway shows. Among them was a 1952 mono LP - the most complete one made up to that time - of Sigmund Romberg's operetta The Student Prince, in which he starred with Dorothy Kirsten. It was long out of print, but has since been reissued on CD.

Most frequently, Rounseville appeared in modest revivals of operettas and musicals at the New York City Center, in shows such as Brigadoon (as Charlie Dalrymple) and Show Boat (as Gaylord Ravenal). But in 1965, he returned in a major Broadway production, when he appeared as The Padre in the original stage version of Man of La Mancha, a role he reprised in the 1972 revival at the Vivian Beaumont Theater.

During the last years of his life, Rounseville attended meetings of the NYC founding chapter of "The Sons of the Desert", where he performed for the club's members and enjoyed watching the film comedies of Laurel & Hardy. He was a lifelong friend of Florence Louise Pettitt, an opera conductor from his home town in Massachusetts.

Rounseville died suddenly in 1974. Theatre World reported that he collapsed from a heart attack while teaching a singing class in his Carnegie Hall studio.
