= Uphams Corner =

Commercial center in Massachusetts, US

Coordinates: 42°19′1.2″N 71°3′54.8″W

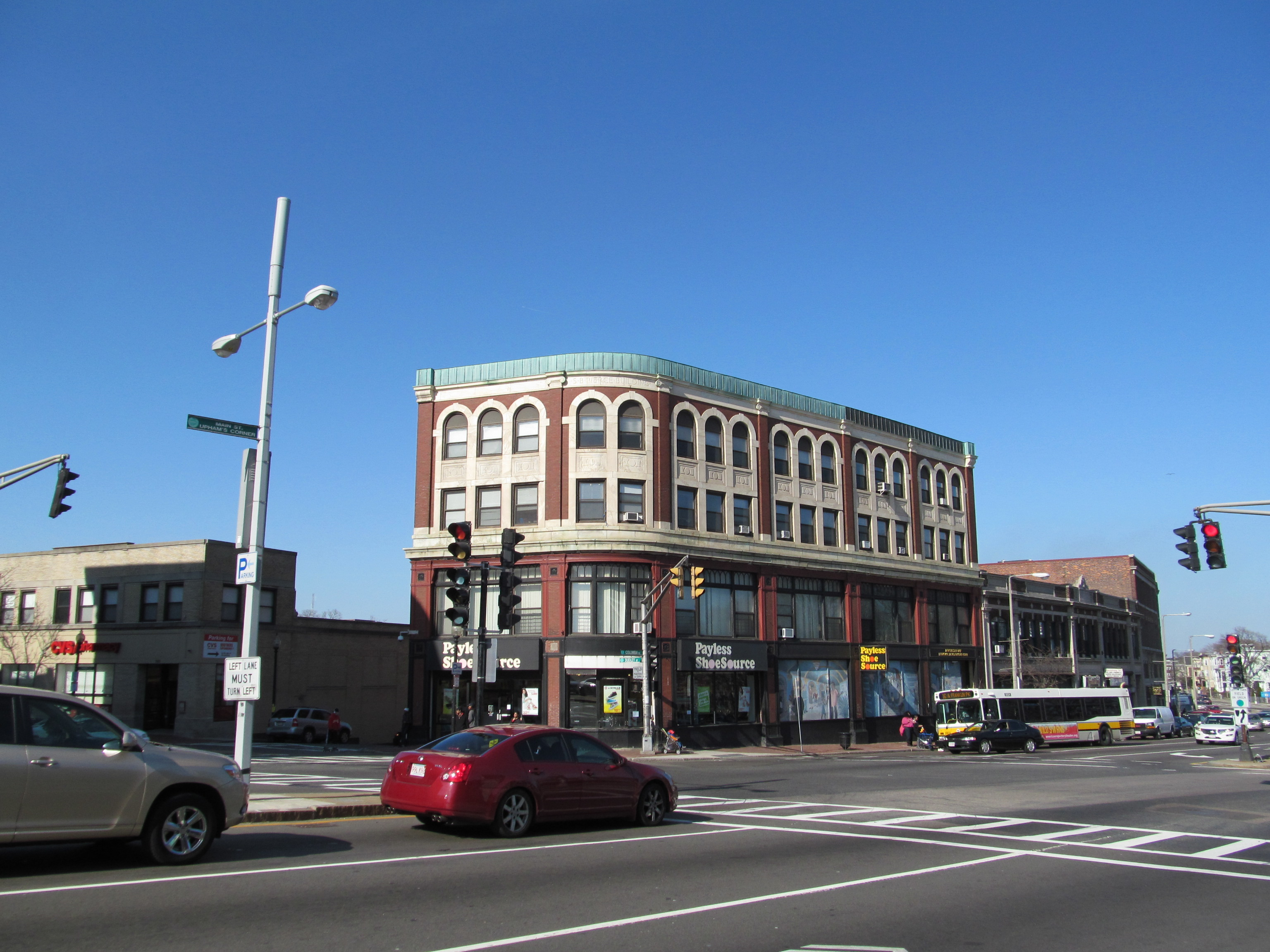
S. B. Pierce Building in Uphams Corner

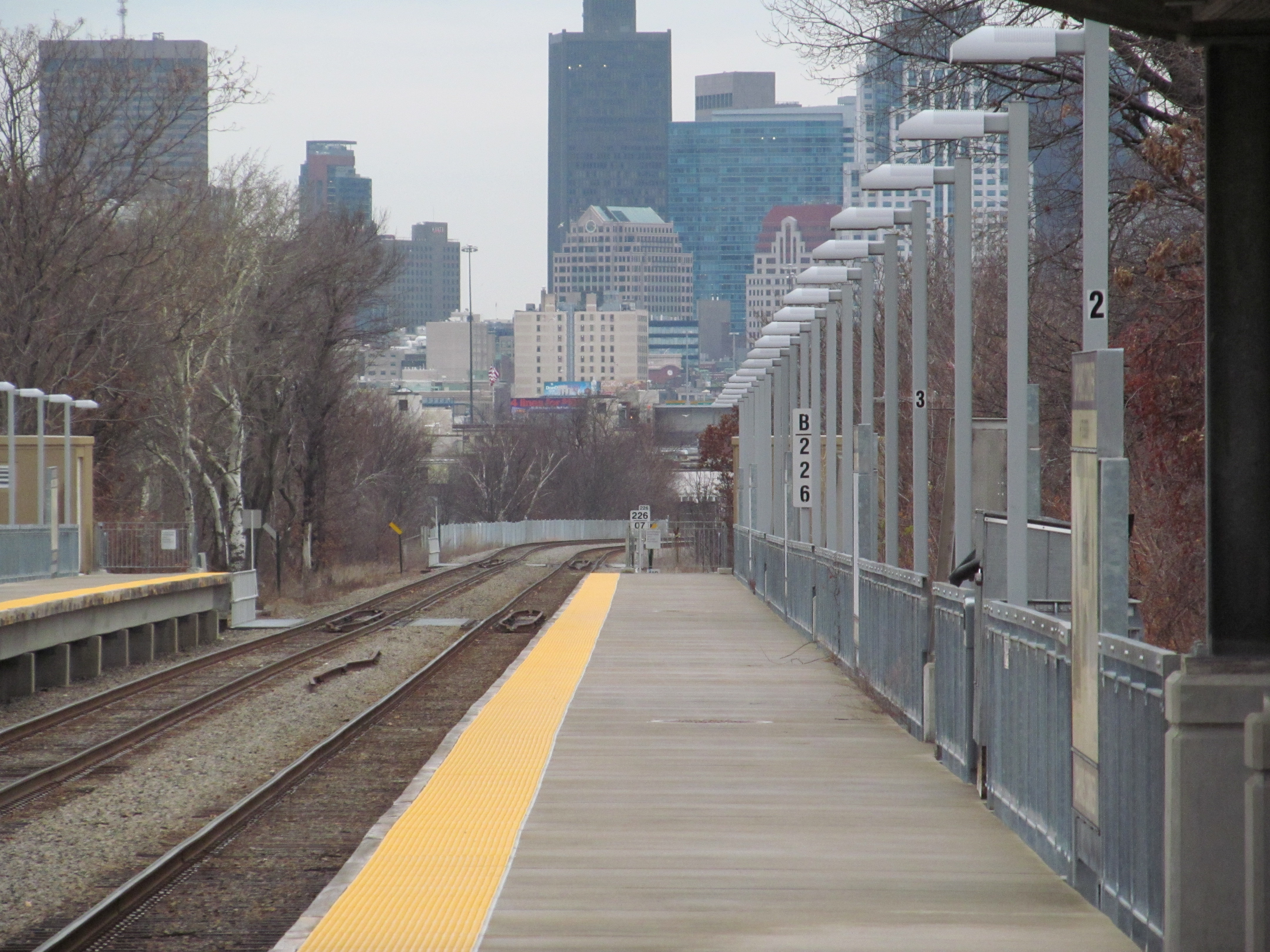
Looking inbound at the Upham's Corner station

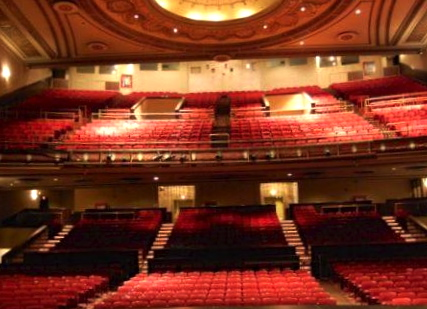
Renovated Strand Theatre in Uphams Corner

Uphams Corner, or Upham's Corner, is a commercial center in Dorchester, the largest neighborhood of Boston, Massachusetts. The intersection of Dudley Street/Stoughton Street and Columbia Road is the heart of Uphams Corner, and one of Dorchester's main business districts.

It is served by the MBTA Commuter Rail's Fairmount Line (at the Upham's Corner stop), as well as several MBTA bus lines.

The district has several historical sites, including the Strand Theatre, the Columbia Square Masonic Hall Building (1895), and Dorchester North Burying Ground (1634), one of the nation's oldest and one of seven seventeenth-century burying grounds in Boston.

The Uphams Corner business district is part of the North Dorchester section of Boston, home to a diverse mix of people, including Black, Cape Verdean, Haitian, Hispanic, white, and Asian populations. Of the residents living within a mile of Uphams Corner, about 43% are Black, 22% white, and 19% Hispanic. Dining options in the area include Southern soul food as well as restaurants serving food from around the world, including Cape Verdean, Caribbean, Chinese, Greek, and Italian.

== History ==
Upham's Corner is named for Amos Upham (1789-1872), born in Weston and trained as a baker, who opened a grocery store around 1820 likely on the site of the present Columbia Square building. This store was run by three generations of the Upham family, into the mid-1890s. Later on, in the 1920s, the Upham's Corner Market was established as one of the world's first supermarkets. In 1990, it was added to the National Register of Historic Places.

== Education ==
The Edward Everett Elementary School, Boston Collegiate Charter Middle and High Schools, the William E. Russell Elementary School, the Roger Clap Innovation School, the John W. McCormack School, the Lilla G. Frederick Pilot School, and Conservatory Lab Charter School are located near Upham's Corner.

== Creative economic development ==
In 2015, Artmorpheus, a Boston-based nonprofit, launched the Fairmount Innovation Lab, a partnership initiative with the Fairmount Cultural Corridor. The Lab is an interdisciplinary space designed to support innovative, local entrepreneurs and artists launching enterprises. Created as a hub and launchpad for accelerating creative and social enterprise in the Fairmount Indigo corridor, the Lab encourages collaboration across disciplines and sectors.

The Fairmount Innovation Lab runs Launchpad, a startup accelerator, a selective four-month program that offers creative and social entrepreneurs with coworking space, lean business model training, expert mentors, shared resources and community with an evolving roster of thinkers and doers.

== Public art ==
In 2014, Boston Mayor Marty Walsh announced a major municipal investment in the Uphams Corner Main Street area's infrastructure. The $3.1 million investment was put in place to help finance a number of neighborhood initiatives, including revamping local storefronts, adding street and sidewalk lights and improving the Strand Theatre. The monetary move also had positive implications in the realm of public art. Walsh's transition focused on fostering public art and injecting culture into each of Boston's various neighborhoods, along with bringing Boston to the forefront of global innovation and technology. As per Walsh's announcement, new arts and culture programs through the Uphams Corner ArtPlace initiative will help to boost the commercial district's aesthetics, including a $500,000 public art commission from the Boston Foundation and Dudley Street Neighborhood Initiative.

== Strand Theatre ==
In 2005, the city of Boston made a $6 million, four-year capital investment to rejuvenate the historic Strand Theatre in Upham's Corner. On January 9, 2007, Mayor Thomas Menino gave his State of the City Address from the stage of the Strand Theatre to help bring attention to restoration efforts and help revive the venue's historic prominence in the city of Boston. Advertised as Dorchester's New Million Dollar Photoplay Palace, the Strand Theatre originally opened in 1918 as one of the first theaters designed specifically for motion pictures.

== Popular culture ==
Some of the exteriors and interiors in the film Gone Baby Gone, directed by Ben Affleck, were shot in Uphams Corner.
