= Becca Conviser =

American opera singer

- Born: Rebecca Conviser; Chicago, IL
- Occupation: Operatic soprano
- Years active: 2010 –
- Website: beccaconviser.com

Becca Conviser is an American operatic Soprano. She was the first American in history to reprise the role of Cizí kněžna in Dvorak’s Rusalka in the Czech Republic.

== Biography ==
Becca Conviser moved to Glencoe, IL from Chicago, where she attended New Trier High School and began her vocal and instrumental and theory training at the Music Institute of Chicago.

In 2020, she was grant recipient from the Grammy's producer, The Recording Academy, and was deemed an essential artist by the Czech Ministry of Culture, allowing her to perform during the Czech National State of Emergency in response to the COVID-19 pandemic.

She is founder and director of the non-profit young artist program Opernfest Prague which provides education and training to young artists transitioning from conservatory to international careers.
