= Rob Dehlinger =

American singer-songwriter

Rob Dehlinger is a singer, trumpet player, and composer living in the San Francisco Bay Area. He is the frontman for “Rob Dehlinger and His Alpha Rhythm Kings”.

Rob and his Alpha Rhythm Kings have been called "swaggering" by the Washington Post (December 21, 2023), and is "an exhilarating, charismatic trumpet player" and "magnetic" singer, according to Jazz Corner (March 28, 2018).

Dehlinger's music, jingles, and other audio productions are featured heavily in the world of podcasts, especially in those which focus on topics related to Disney properties (Star Wars in particular). He is referred to as the "John Williams of Podcasting" by hosts and fans of shows such as "Skywalking Through Neverland", "The Neverland Podcast", "Talking Apes TV", "Rebel Force Radio", "Disney Vault Talk", "Fangirls Going Rogue", "Almost Famous", and others.

Rob composed the musical score for the film “Portable Storage”, which enjoyed a screening at Lucasfilm/ILM in San Francisco, and was released in 2016.

Rob has appeared on the nationally televised PBS specials "A Taste of Chanukah" and "A Taste of Passover", as well as an Emmy-award-winning episode of the Bay Area PBS arts show "Spark". Rob works routinely in the Bay Area venues, including Slim's, Great American Music Hall, Yoshi's, Bimbo's, Yerba Buena Center for the Arts, Bill Graham Civic Auditorium, the Regency Ballroom, and George Lucas' Skywalker Sound studios. He performs regularly at Disneyland in Anaheim, California, and has toured Europe and Australia.

Dehlinger's orchestral arrangement of Iggy Pop's "Lust For Life" was recorded by San Francisco's Punk Rock Orchestra with Grammy winning engineer Leslie Ann Jones, and was featured on NPR's Weekend Edition.

Rob's band, the Alpha Rhythm Kings, performed for the 2018 Grammy Awards Nominee Celebration, San Francisco Chapter. In 2025, Rob Dehlinger and His Alpha Rhythm Kings were invited to Osaka, Japan, to represent the United States as performers at the World Expo.

Dehlinger a master's degree from the New England Conservatory in Boston, MA and is a prominent music educator in the San Francisco Bay Area.

== Discography ==
With “Rob Dehlinger and His Alpha Rhythm Kings”

- Party Time, 11-song album, Dehlinger Productions (2026)
- Party Man, single, Dehlinger Productions (2026)
- Rag Doll, single, Dehlinger Productions (2024)
- Baciagaloop, single, Dehlinger Productions (2023)
- Vaccinate Me, Baby, single, Dehlinger Productions (2022)
- Choo Choo Ch’Boogie (Feat. Tammi Savoy), single, Dehlinger Productions (2021)
- Sharp Dressed Men, 10-song album, (Dehlinger Productions) (2020)
- California Boogie, 4-song E.P., Dehlinger Productions (2017)

As a Side Man

- In a Silent Way, on the album "Launch Fever", The Space Rangers, Mars Czar Records. Trumpet (2026)
- The Goon, single, Chris Lujan, Macro-Tone Records. Trumpet (2025)
- Hey Love, single, Andre Cruz, Chris Lujan, Industry Music Group. Trumpet (2025)
- The Real Thing, album, Chris Lujan, Lugnut Brand Records. Trumpet, tracks 1 "My Back Hurts (From Picking Up the Pieces of My Broken Heart)", 4 "Guilty As Charged", & 7 "I Think I'm In Love With You" (2022)
- Total Nonstop Action, album, The M-Tet, Funk Night Records. Trumpet, track 7 "Pinch Hitter" & 8 "Recollecting" (2020)
- Greater Things, The Harmalators. Trumpet, track 1 "Greater Things" & track 4 "I Want You to Know" (2015)
- Rise & Shine, Scott Gagner. Trumpet & Flugelhorn (2014)
- Find Shelter Here, Beckah Barnett, Cry Love Records. Trumpet, track 3 "Saint Valentine" & track 8 "To Whom it May Concern" (2012)
- Listening to the Light, Verlin Chalmers, Wax Light Music. Trumpet (2012)
- Kit and the Branded Men. Trumpet, track 10 "I Don't Wanna Drink Every Night" (2011)
- Strugglin', single 45 rpm, The Lugknuckles, Lugnut Brand Records (2011)
- All Night Party, Phil Berkowitz, Dirty Cat Records. Trumpet, track 5 "Always a First Time" & track 14 "The Party's Over" (2009)
- Life After 339, Panthelion, Dvorzak Publishing. Trumpet, track 1 "Blue at Midnight" & track 4 "Ink" (2006)
- Long Way From Tomorrow, Small Change Romeos, Milk Jug Music. Trumpet (2004)

As a Band Member

- A Taste of Passover, Rounder Records. Trumpet (1998)
- A Taste of Chanukah, Rounder Records. Trumpet (1999)
- Avocado Igloo, The Circadians, Papa Cosmo Music. Vocals, Trumpet, Keyboard, Co-Songwriter (2001)
- That's Alright, Stompy Jones, Harp Records. Trumpet, Backing Vocals (2007)
- Santa Claus, single, Whack Magic, Dehlinger Productions. Vocals, Trumpet, Co-Songwriter (2008)
- Built to Last, single, Whack Magic, Dehlinger Productions. Vocals, Trumpet, Co-Songwriter (2012)
- Sock it to Me, Stompy Jones, Harp Records. Trumpet, Backing Vocals. (2012)

As a Solo Artist

- Life as a Joy Ride, single, Dehlinger Productions (2012)
- Raul, single, Dehlinger Productions (2012)
- Psychological Archeology, single, Dehlinger Productions (2013)
- Songs For My Friends, Volume 1, Dehlinger Productions (2014)
- Skywalking Through Neverland: Awesome Jingle Mix, Vol. 1, Dehlinger Productions (2016)
