= New England Conservatory of Music =

Music school in Boston, Massachusetts

New England Conservatory
- Type: Private music school
- Established: February 18, 1867; 159 years ago
- Endowment: $164.5 million
- President: Andrea Kalyn
- Dean: Richard Giarusso (Academic) and Hank Mou (Artistic)
- Students: 750
- Location: Boston, Massachusetts, United States
- Campus: Urban
- Website: necmusic.edu
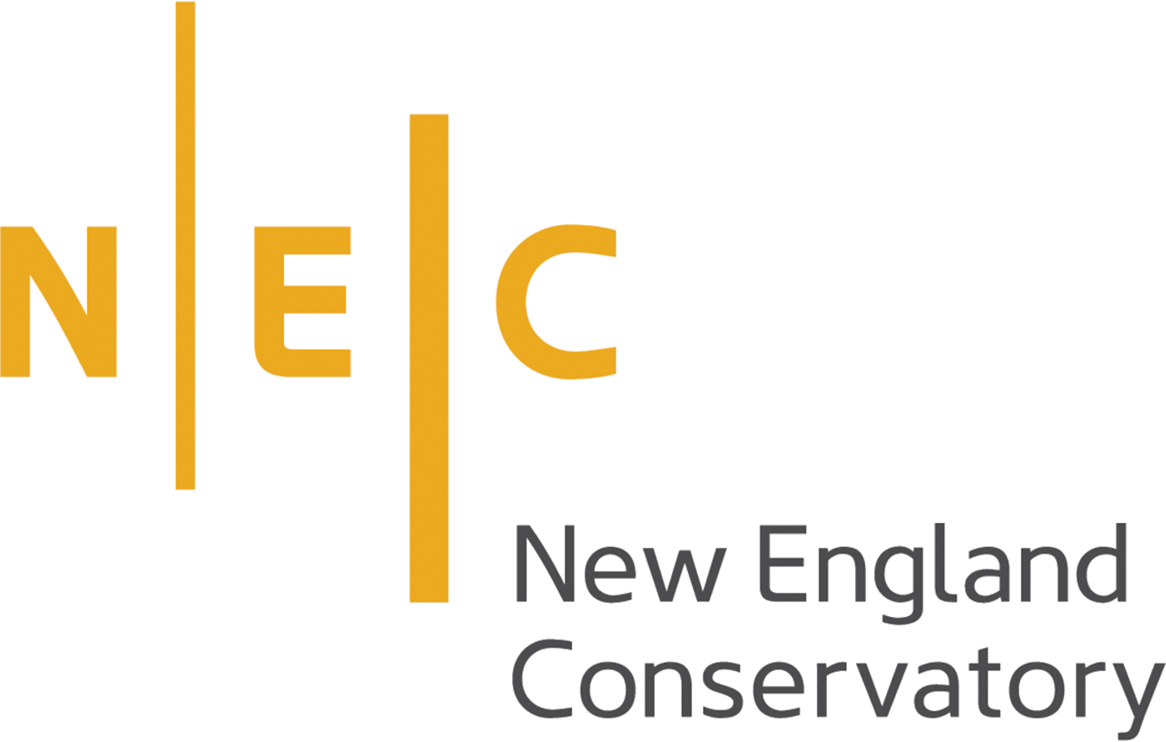
- New England Conservatory of Music
- U.S. National Register of Historic Places
- U.S. National Historic Landmark
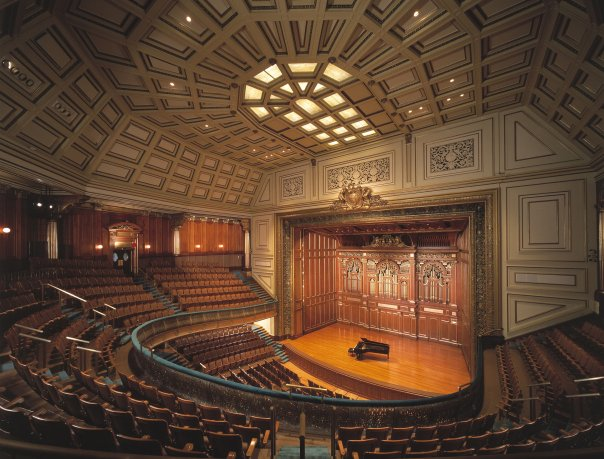
- Jordan Hall; NEC's principal performance space

- Location within Massachusetts Location within the United States
- Location: 290 Huntington Ave. Boston, Massachusetts
- Coordinates: 42°20′28″N 71°05′11″W
- Area: 1 acre (0.4 ha)
- Built: 1903
- Architects: Wheelwright & Haven
- Architectural style: Renaissance
- NRHP reference No.: 80000672
- Added to NRHP: May 14, 1980

The New England Conservatory of Music (NEC) is a private music school in Boston, Massachusetts, United States. The conservatory is located on Huntington Avenue along the Avenue of the Arts near Boston Symphony Hall, and is home to approximately 750 students pursuing undergraduate and graduate studies, and 1,500 more in its Preparatory School and School of Continuing Education. NEC offers bachelor's degrees in instrumental and vocal classical music performance, contemporary musical arts, composition, jazz studies, music history, and music theory, as well as graduate degrees in collaborative piano, conducting, and musicology. The conservatory has also partnered with Harvard University and Tufts University to create joint double-degree, five-year programs.

== History and leadership ==
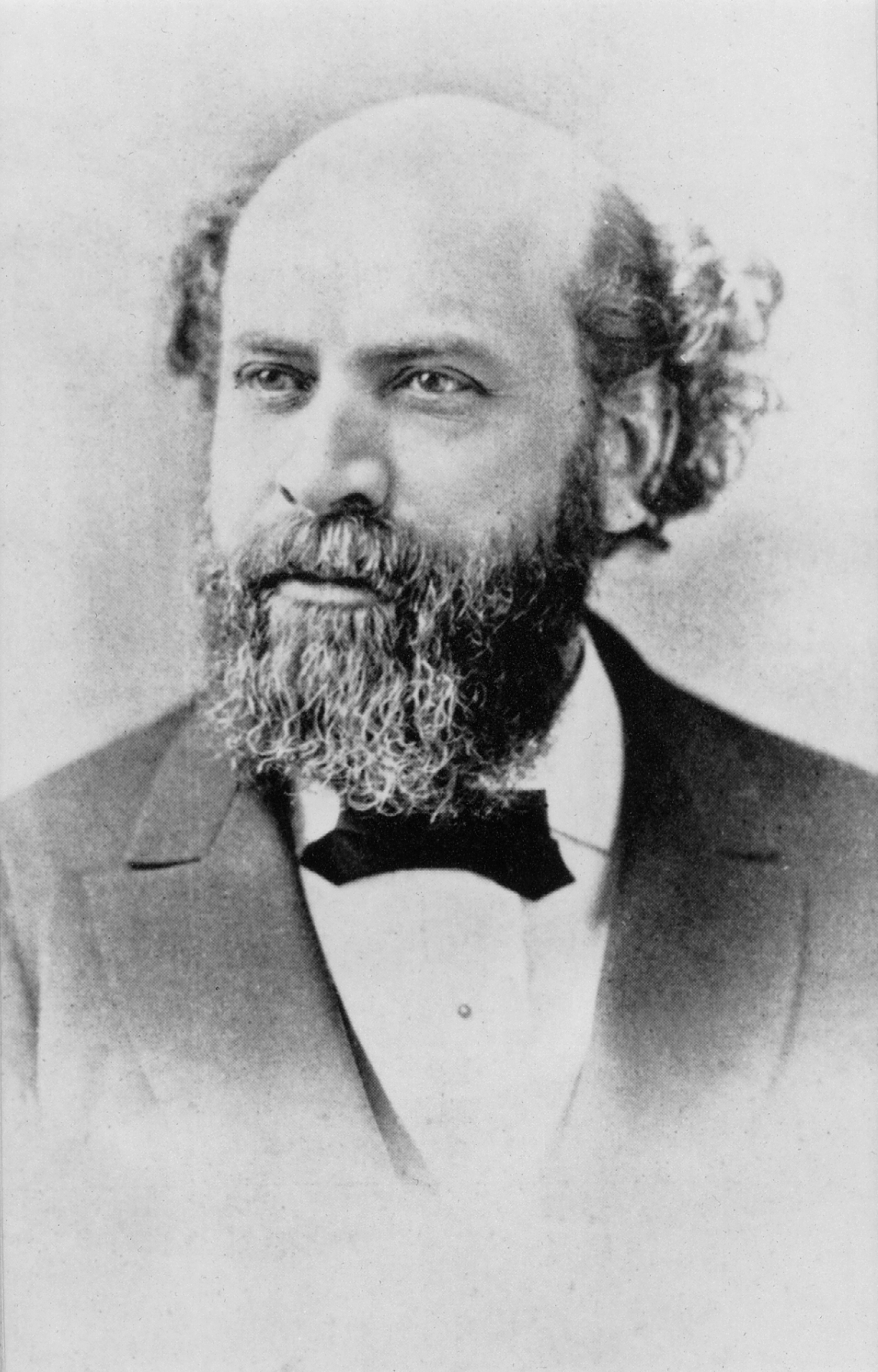
Eben Tourjée, founder of New England Conservatory of Music

=== Founding an American conservatory (1867) ===
In June 1853, a nineteen-year-old music teacher from Providence, Rhode Island named Eben Tourjée made his first attempt to found a music conservatory in Boston, Massachusetts. He met with a group of Boston's most influential musical leaders to discuss the foundation of a school based on popular and well-established European conservatories. Among the voices in the discussion were John Sullivan Dwight, an influential music critic; Dr. J. Baxter Upham, president of the Harvard Musical Association; and Oliver Ditson, a prominent music publisher. The group initially rejected Tourjée's plans, arguing that it was a poor idea to open a conservatory amidst the nation's current political and economic uncertainty, which would ultimately lead to the American Civil War.

It was not until the Civil War subsided that Tourjée made his next attempt to establish a school in Boston. In December 1866, he again met with a group of Boston's top musicians and music patrons. Joining the former attendees Upham, Dwight, and Ditson were Carl Zerrahn and Charles Perkins. In the thirteen-year interim, Tourjée had gained both experience and success in founding three music schools in Rhode Island, and this time was able to convince his audience of the persisting need and demand for such institutions. The men agreed to support Tourjée, and The New England Conservatory—then consisting of just seven rented rooms above the Boston Music Hall off Tremont Street—officially opened on February 18, 1867. At the turn of the century, the original building was converted into a vaudeville theater called the Orpheum Theater, which still stands today.

=== Early history (1868–1900) ===
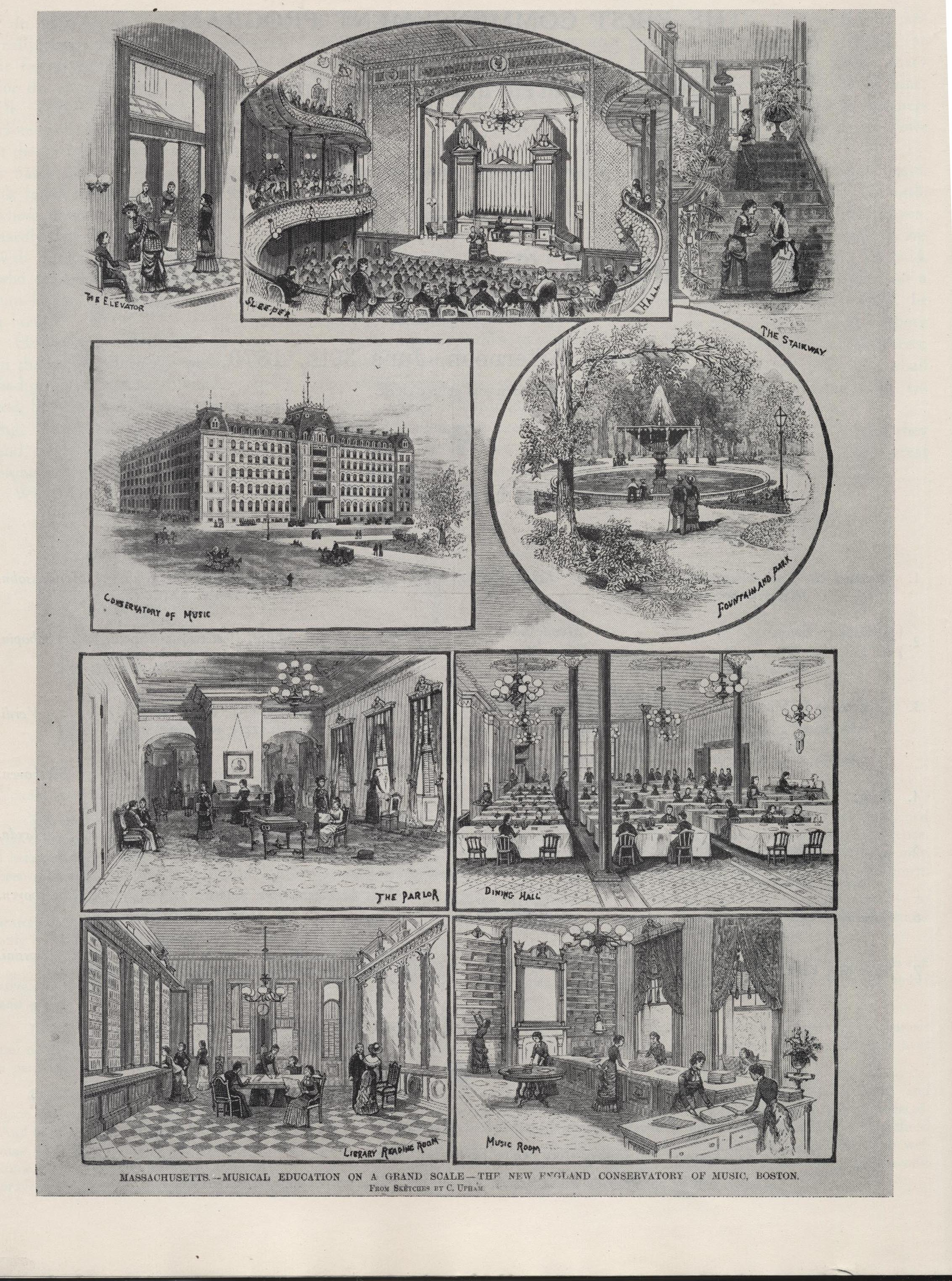
Illustrations from NEC's second home at the former St. James Hotel in Franklin Square. NEC was located there from 1882 to 1902.

Tourjée continued establishing his public presence within the musical community in Boston by initiating the first national conference of music teachers, which met in Boston as the National Music Congress in 1869. Under the direction of Patrick Gilmore, he was also selected as one of the organizers behind Boston's National Peace Jubilee. That same year, he assembled and rehearsed a chorus of over 10,000 that performed in present-day Copley Square to celebrate the end of the Civil War. Three years later at the World's Peace Jubilee, which he also co-organized under Gilmore, the size of his chorus was doubled.

Similarly, New England Conservatory was also establishing itself as a pioneering institution even in its infancy. It was the first school in the United States to offer a course in public school music, and one of the faculty members who taught that course, Luther Whiting Mason, was the first to introduce music into Boston Public Schools. At the request of the Japanese government, Mason traveled to the country from 1879 to 1882 to introduce western music education to Japanese schools. In Japan, this system came to be known as the "Mason-song" system.

By the end of 1868, the conservatory had grown from its original seven rooms to twenty-five, with 1,212 students enrolled. Meanwhile, Tourjée established an affiliation with Boston University in hopes of providing a more comprehensive collegiate education for musicians. He eventually took on the role of Dean at the university, holding the position until his death in 1891.

By 1882, NEC had outgrown the rooms in the Boston Music Hall and moved operations to the St. James Hotel in Franklin Square in Boston's South End. The large building functioned as both an academic facility and a residence hall for female students. Even though St. James Hotel provided many amenities the Music Hall had been lacking, it still desperately needed a recital hall. So in 1884, the conservatory purchased land adjacent to the hotel and, almost immediately, construction began on a new recital hall. Through substantial contributions from wealthy trustees, including Jacob Sleeper, the new hall was rushed to completion and Sleeper Hall opened on January 13, 1886. The hall was rapidly put to heavy use, with 109 classical music concerts and hundreds of student recitals performed in the first year.

As the conservatory grew, so did its ties to musical life in Boston. When Henry Higginson founded the Boston Symphony Orchestra in 1881, he called on 19 members of NEC faculty to serve as section leaders. The close ties between these historic institutions continue today.

=== 20th century ===
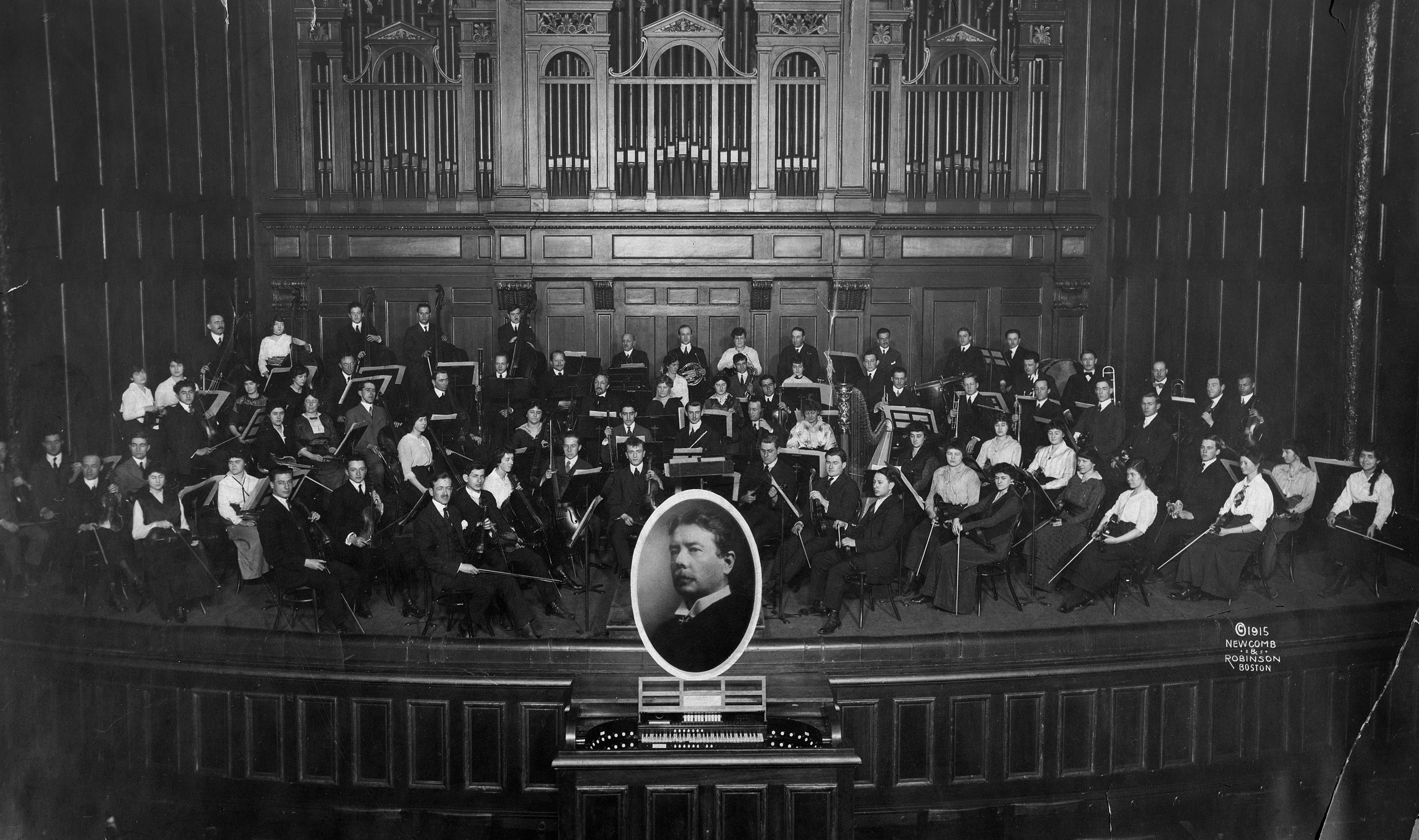
NEC Symphony Orchestra, 1915 with George Whitefield Chadwick

By the turn of the century, NEC had come under the leadership of George W. Chadwick, a well-known composer who had been on the faculty since 1882. During his tenure, the foundation was laid that shaped NEC's identity for the whole of the 20th century. Chadwick again recognized the need for a new facility and selected a location on Huntington Ave, which was quickly becoming a cultural center of Boston with the recently built Symphony Hall one block away. Once again through the generosity of its trustees, namely Eben Dryer Jordan Jr., another plot of land was purchased and, in 1901, construction began on a new concert hall at 290 Huntington Ave. The Jordan Hall building opened for students beginning in 1902, but the official inauguration of the concert hall took place on October 20, 1903, with a grand performance by the Boston Symphony Orchestra.

In addition, Chadwick assembled the first complete orchestral ensemble and established the first opera program at NEC. Chadwick ultimately shifted the focus of NEC's curriculum from casual music students interested in occasional lessons or courses to prioritizing students who wished to earn college diplomas and, beginning in 1926, baccalaureate degrees.

Like most academic institutions in the 1930s and early 1940s, NEC saw a decline in enrollment throughout the Great Depression and the closely following events of World War II. But by 1946, enrollment had doubled to over 2,300 students, with fifty percent of those degree candidates enrolled through the G.I. Bill to earn their college degrees following service in WWII.

Through the 1950s, the school once again began redefining itself under the leadership of president Harrison Keller. He minimized the original diploma program by encouraging students to enroll into degree programs instead—which, by this time, had also expanded to include master's degree programs. Keller also established an academic studies department and developed a full four-year theory curriculum. In addition, the Artist Diploma program was initiated for a small number of highly gifted performers. Keller later founded the Department of Music for Young People, the precursor to NEC's present-day Preparatory School, and also oversaw construction of a new dormitory which opened in 1960.

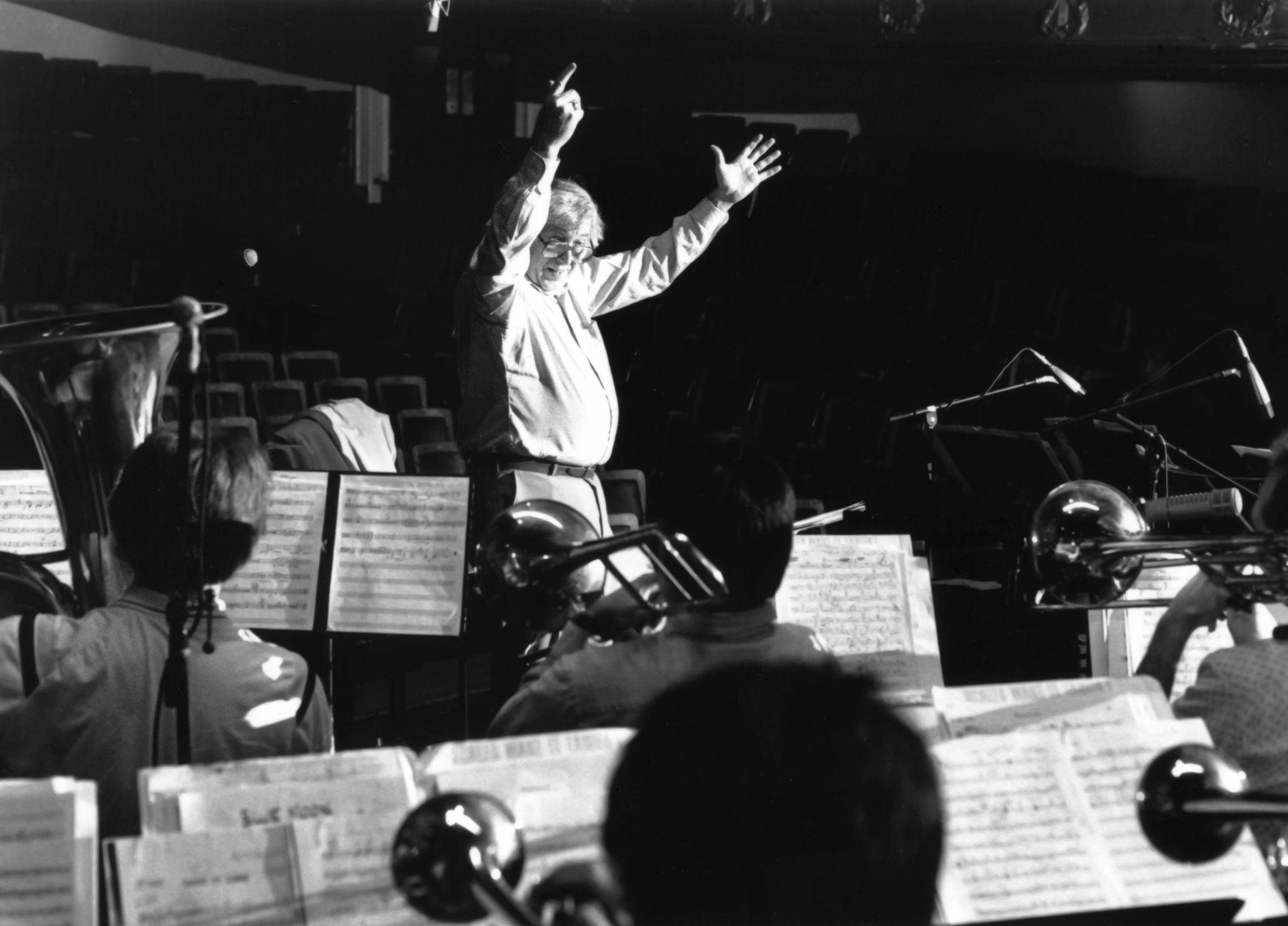
Gunther Schuller leads NEC Jazz Orchestra, 1990.

In 1967, composer, conductor, and author Gunther Schuller was selected President of NEC, just as the school was celebrating its centennial. Like Chadwick, Schuller was a transformational leader for the conservatory. In 1969, he established the first fully-accredited jazz degree program in the United States and, a few years later, introduced "Third Stream" studies into the curriculum. "Third Stream" was the term coined by Schuller to describe the synthesis of jazz and classical music. Eventually, it gained its own department and degree program, first renamed Contemporary Improvisation, and renamed again in 2022 to Contemporary Musical Arts (CMA). The CMA department incorporates a wide variety of global and ethnic musical traditions, aural traditions, and improvisation into the conservatory's traditionally classical roots. Schuller also helped to renew interest in another style of American music: ragtime. He formed the New England Conservatory Ragtime Ensemble in 1971. Additional changes to the curriculum included a new program in early musical performance, as well as an overhaul of the music education department. Finally, Schuller expanded local outreach into the community by creating the Community Services department, known today as the Community Performances and Partnerships department.

From 1983 to 1996, NEC was headed by renowned cellist and longtime faculty member Laurence Lesser. During his tenure, the campus expanded with the purchase of two additional buildings for classrooms and administrative offices. Lesser shepherded a major capital campaign to fund the 1994–95 restoration of Jordan Hall, and instituted the Doctorate of Musical Arts (DMA) degree along with a considerable number of additional graduate school offerings.

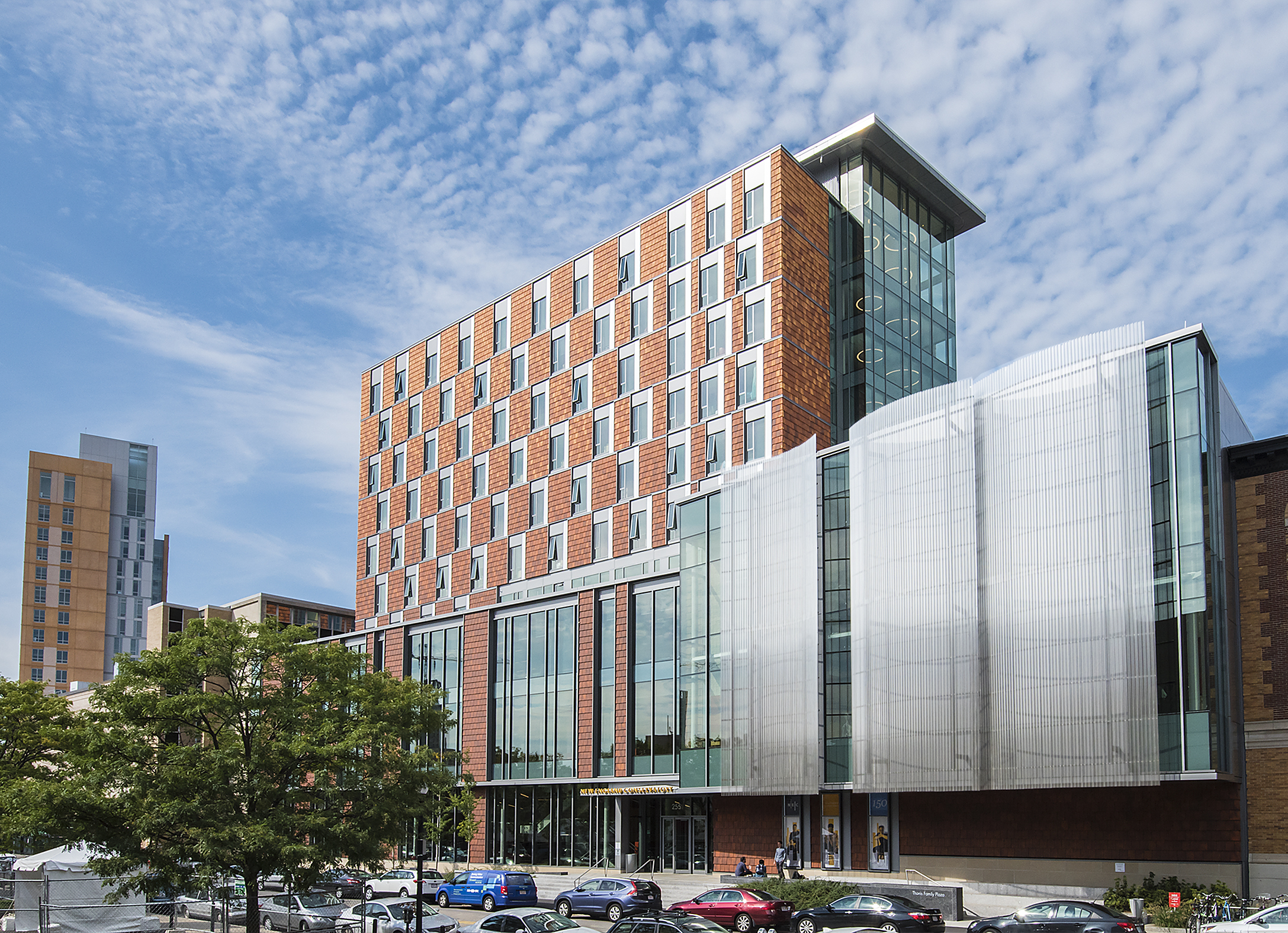
NEC's Student Life and Performance Center (SLPC), 2017

=== 21st century ===
Daniel Steiner, a former member of the board of trustees, served as the conservatory's only president who was not also a musician. During his tenure from 1999 to 2006, his goal was to "make NEC a top school in its field like MIT and Harvard." Toward that end, Steiner established a joint-degree program with Harvard and a chamber music training program, boosted financial aid resources, and hired prominent faculty members to attract more applicants. Both the size and reputation of NEC saw a substantial increase, and Steiner raised $72 million over the last three years of his presidency.

In 2007, Tony Woodcock took the helm and served as NEC's president until 2015. He instituted both of the programs for Sistema Fellows and Entrepreneurial Musicianship, and ended his tenure with the groundbreaking for the Student Life and Performance Center (SLPC), the school's first new building since 1960.

In January 2019, Andrea Kalyn became NEC's 17th and first female president. Demonstrating an immediate commitment to expanding diversity initiatives, Kalyn "founded the Center for Cultural Equity and Belonging (CEB) to shape, support, and advance institutional practices relative to equity, diversity, inclusion, and belonging."

== Campus ==
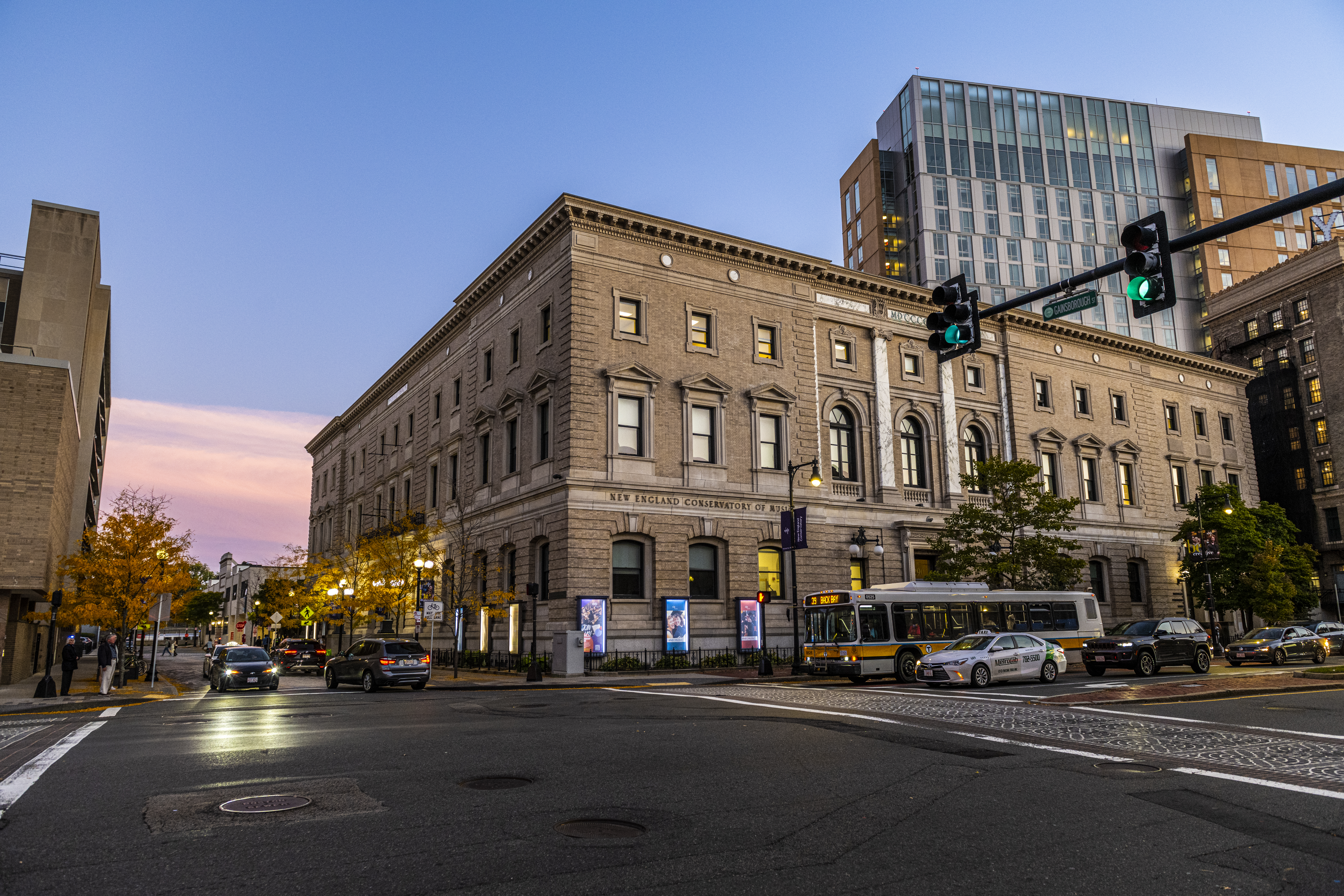
NEC's main building at 290–94 Huntington Avenue was built in 1901, designed by Wheelwright and Haven, and is the location of Jordan Hall.

Today, the NEC campus consists of four buildings along both sides of Gainsborough Street, between St. Botolph Street and Huntington Avenue.

Unofficially called "the Jordan Hall Building," NEC's main building is home to Jordan Hall and three smaller performance spaces: Williams Hall, Brown Hall, and the Keller Room; the Performance Library; faculty offices and teaching studios; and student practice rooms. At 33 Gainsborough sits the former Residence Hall, which is now commonly known as "33 G" for its location on Gainsborough Street. This building primarily houses administrative departments, the copy/mail center, and additional practice rooms; it also housed the on-campus store Music Espresso until the store ceased operations and was converted into offices. The "St. Botolph Building" at 241 St. Botolph Street contains Pierce Hall, along with the majority of the school's classrooms and administrative offices. NEC's newest building, the Student Life and Performance Center (SLPC), opened in 2017 and now serves as the NEC Residence Hall. It is also home to the Green Room Café and Speed Dining Commons; the Blumenthal Family Library; the Burnes Hall and Eben Jordan Ensemble Room rehearsal spaces; the Elfers Commons; and the Plimpton Shattuck Black Box Theater, designed specifically for opera performances.

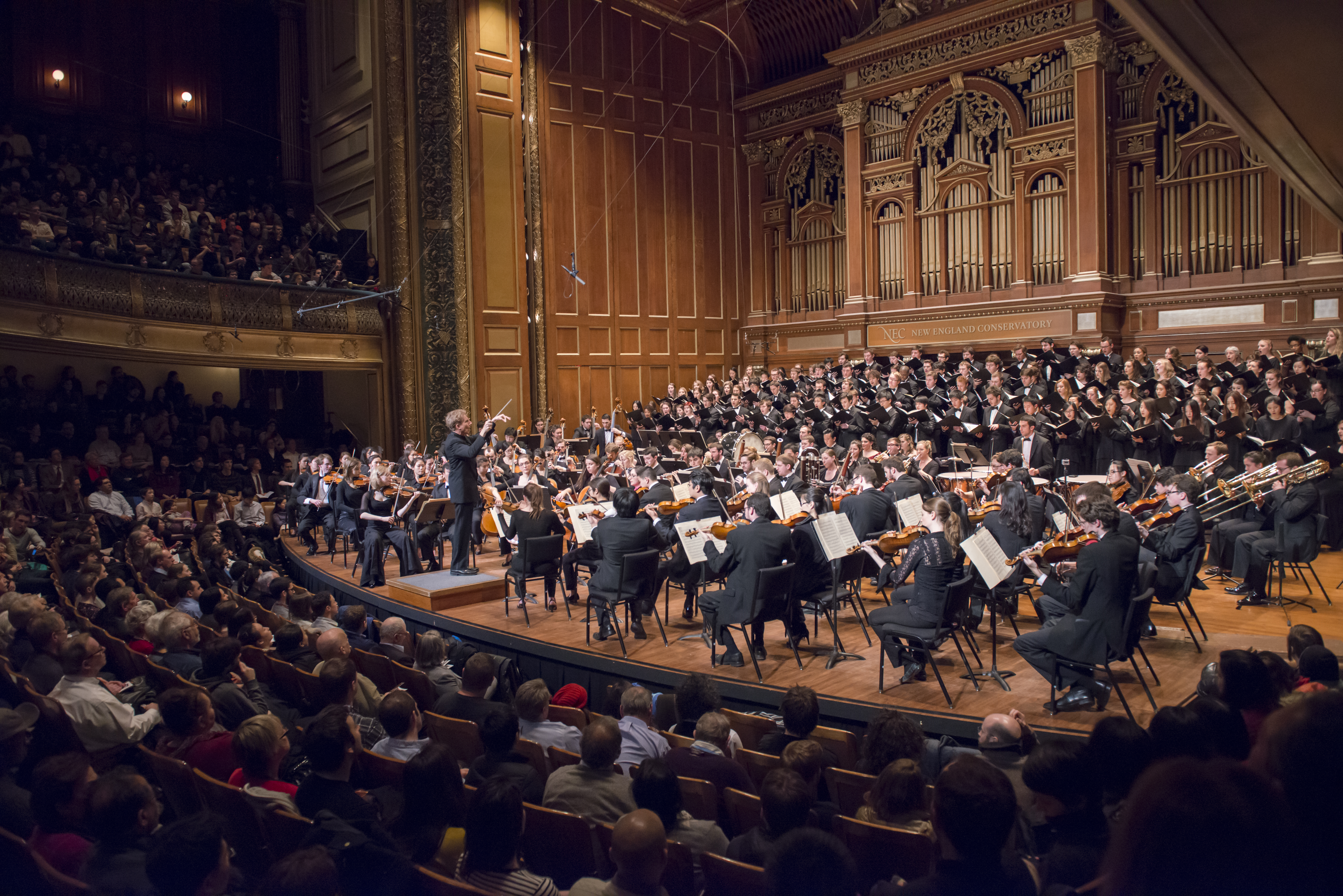
NEC Philharmonia, Concert Choir and conductor Hugh Wolff performing in Jordan Hall

=== Jordan Hall ===
Jordan Hall is NEC's central and most famous performing space. Officially opened in 1903, Jordan Hall was the gift of trustee Eben D. Jordan Jr., son of the co-founder of the Jordan Marsh retail stores and himself an amateur musician.

The dedication concert of Jordan Hall, performed by the Boston Symphony Orchestra, took place on October 20, 1903. Newspaper accounts deemed the hall "unequaled the world over," and The Boston Globe reported that it was "a place of entertainment that European musicians who were present that evening say excels in beauty anything of the kind they ever saw."

A major renovation to the performance space was completed in 1995.

== Academics ==
Admission to NEC can be rigorous and is based primarily on a pre-screening recorded video audition followed by a competitive live audition. The conservatory offers degrees in orchestral instruments, conducting, piano, jazz studies, contemporary musical arts, opera and vocal performance and pedagogy, composition, music history, and music theory. NEC also offers minors in Liberal Arts and Music Theory, as well as a concentration in Music Technology.

=== Artist diploma ===
The artist diploma (AD) is the highest-level performance designation offered at NEC. The program is extremely selective with only a small number of applicants admitted to the program each year. The AD program typically lasts two years, and students are awarded a full-tuition scholarship and a living stipend for both years of the program, and they are often featured in special performances and events.

=== Doctoral programs ===
The Doctor of Musical Arts degree (DMA) is a rigorous and selective program intended for performer-scholars who combine the highest standards in their major area with proven accomplishments in research and scholarship. It is designed to provide professional musicians with the necessary knowledge and skills for artistic, cultural, social, and educational leadership.

The DMA degree is offered in all areas of solo performance, composition, collaborative piano, chamber music for piano, conducting, jazz performance and composition, contemporary musical arts, and music theory. NEC enrolls a small class of 8–12 students each year to ensure the highest degree of flexibility and individual attention.

=== Dual-degree programs ===
The conservatory offers five-year joint double-degree programs with Harvard University and Tufts University. These programs allow students who have interests in both music and another field to have access to the resources of both pursuits.

==== Tufts/NEC ====
The Tufts/NEC allowed highly motivated students to receive a Bachelor of Arts or a Bachelor of Science degree from the School of Arts and Sciences at Tufts and a Bachelor of Music degree from NEC over 5 years of study, immersing students in intensive studies in liberal arts, music theory, and musicianship, along with weekly lessons and ensembles. Admission to the Tufts/NEC program was highly selective as Tufts and NEC would make their initial admission decisions separately, then NEC would make a second level of admission for the dual-degree program itself. The Tufts/NEC program was terminated in the fall of 2023.

==== Harvard/NEC ====
Students in the Harvard/NEC dual-degree program receive a Bachelor of Arts from Harvard and a Master of Music from NEC over 5 years of study. For the first 4 years, students pursue the typical Bachelor of Arts curriculum in their concentration (major) and take weekly studio instruction at NEC. Students begin their Master of Music coursework during their 4th year and complete their 5th year entire at NEC. Students must be admitted independently to both institutions before receiving an additional decision for admission to the dual-degree.

=== Preparatory School ===
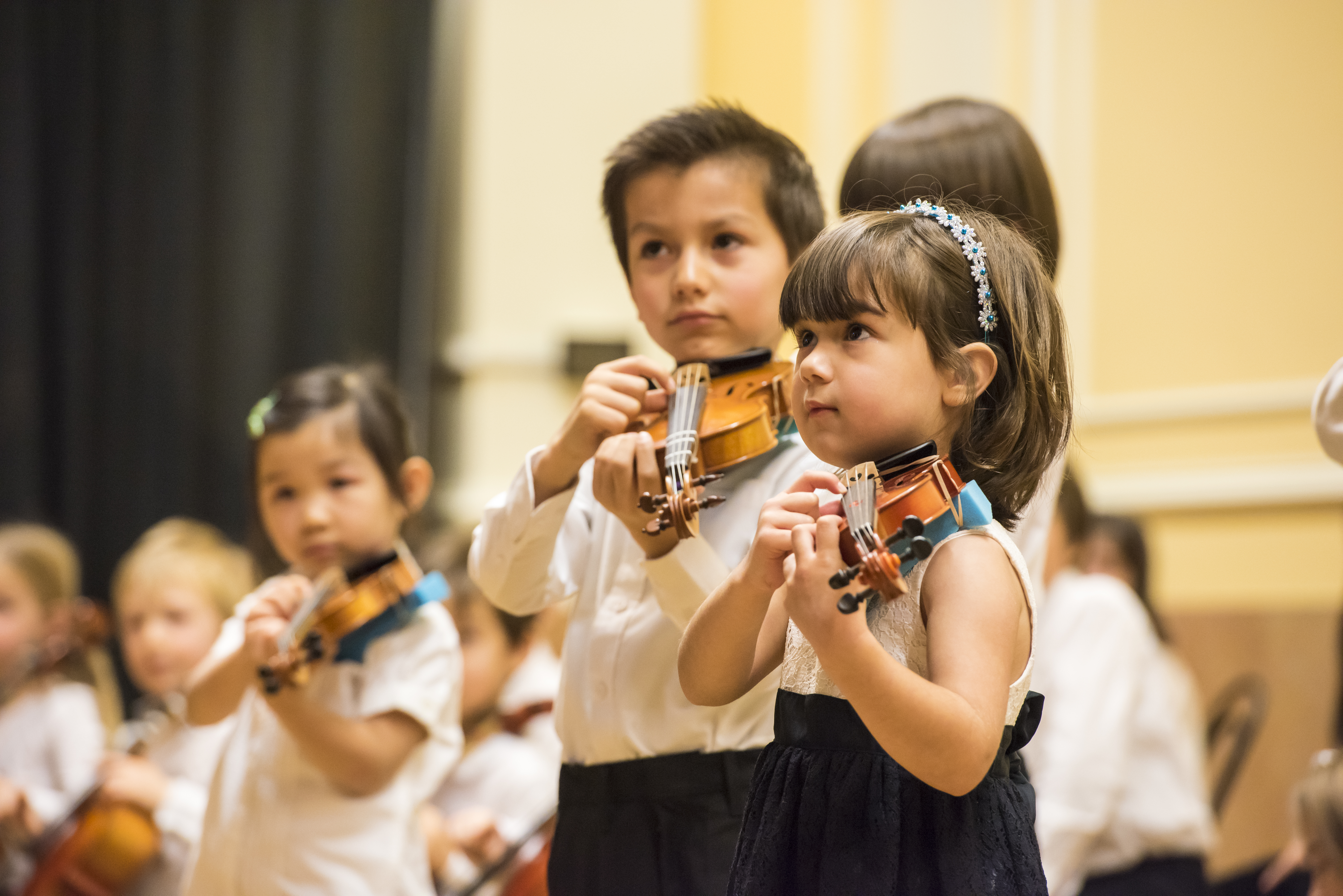
NEC Preparatory School violinists perform in NEC's Brown Hall.

New England Conservatory's Preparatory School is an open-enrollment institution for pre-college students, with over 225 faculty members and 1,300 students ages 0–18. NEC Prep offers private lessons, theory and composition courses, chamber music, and over 35 small and large ensembles of varying levels. Additionally, NEC Prep offers courses, ensembles, and lessons in jazz and Baroque music styles. Early Childhood Music Education, including Eurhythmics and Suzuki Strings for violin, viola, and cello, is available for younger students, ages 0–6, to increase exposure to music in general from an early age and build foundational practices for beginners on string instruments.

Students enrolled in NEC Prep may participate in the Certificate Program, allowing students to achieve their optimum performance skills and demonstrate competence in music theory, literature, and solo repertoire. Multiple certificate levels are offered for each instrumental and vocal area for students to progress through with each subsequent year of attendance.

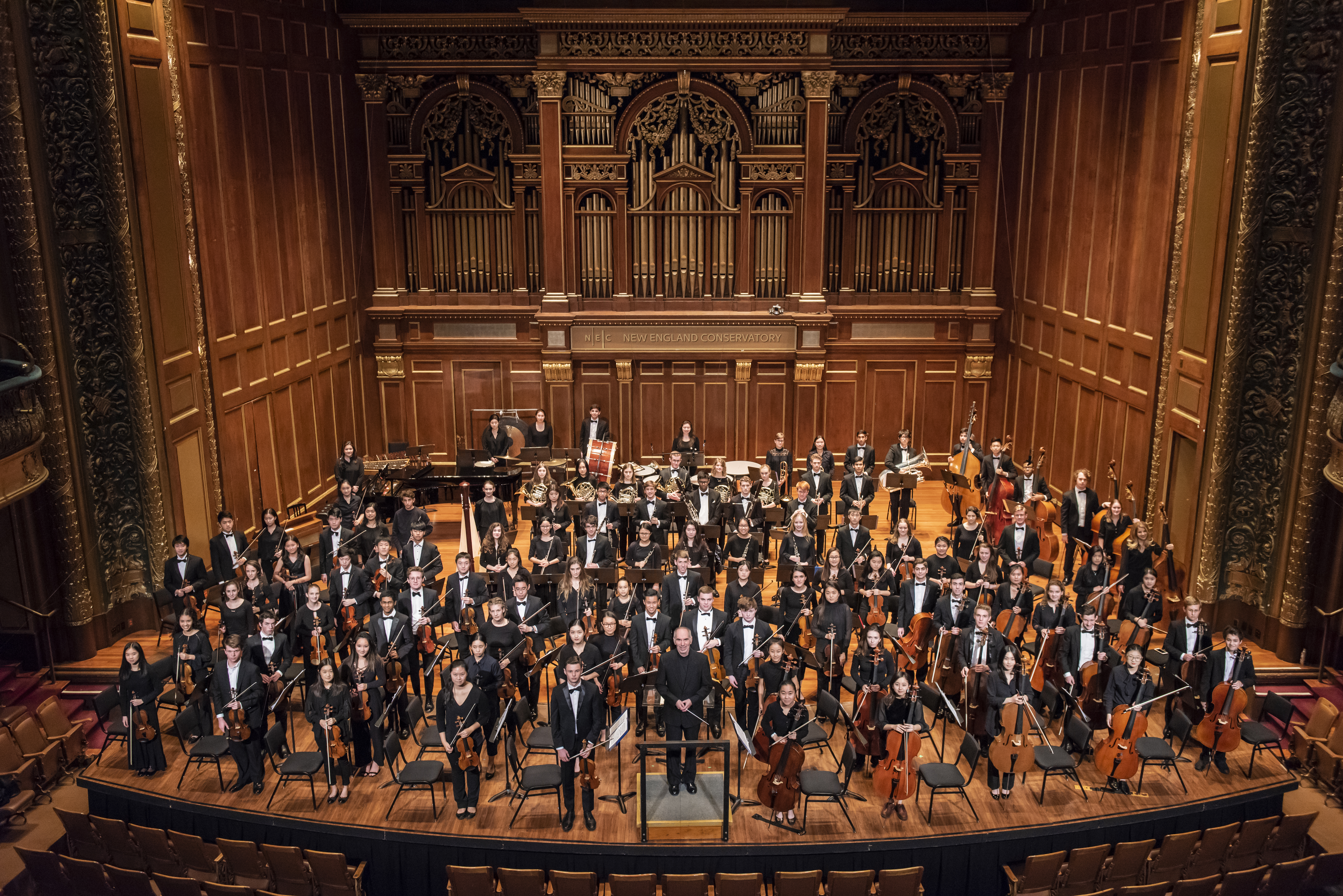
NEC Youth Philharmonic Orchestra with director David Loebel

Large ensemble programming includes four full orchestras, five string orchestras, three wind ensembles, Youth Jazz Orchestra, Youth Brass Ensemble, and three Choral groups. NEC Prep is home to the Youth Philharmonic Orchestra (YPO), the most selective of the large ensembles, as well as the Youth Symphony (YS). All large ensembles perform at least twice each year in NEC's Jordan Hall. YPO, YS, and the Sr. Massachusetts Youth Wind Ensemble are touring ensembles whose recent tour destinations included Iceland, Ireland, Norway, and Spain, Italy and Central Europe.

The Contemporary Music Festival, hosted in the Spring semesters, encourages students to explore new music in an intensive setting and learn contemporary performance practice. Every year, the festival hosts a composer-in-residence who engages with the community in a variety of ways, including visiting classes, working with small and large ensembles, and leading masterclasses. NEC Prep student compositions are performed throughout the festival, sometimes in readings with one of the orchestras. Past Composers-in-Residence include the founding member and artistic director of ETHEL, Ralph Farris (2018), Pulitzer Prize Winner and MacArthur Fellow recipient, John Harbison (2015), and British Composer and former Master of the Queen's Music, Judith Weir (2014). NEC Prep will be welcoming Valerie Coleman as the 2023 Contemporary Music Festival Composer-in-Residence in February 2023.

NEC Prep hosts the Summer Orchestra Institute (SOI), a two-week full symphony orchestra program open to intermediate through advanced-level strings, brass, winds, and percussion students between the ages of 13 and 18. Program activities include full orchestral rehearsals, sectional rehearsals, chamber music reading/coaching sessions, masterclasses, workshops, mock auditions, individual practice time, and two concerts in Jordan Hall.

== People ==
See New England Conservatory alumni for a list of members of the alumni community.
See New England Conservatory past and present teachers for notable members of the faculty.

The faculty and alumni of New England Conservatory comprise nearly fifty percent of the Boston Symphony Orchestra, including 6 members of l'Ordre des Arts et des Lettres, 14 Rome Prize recipients, 51 Guggenheim Fellows, and prizewinners at nearly every major respected music forum in the world. As of January 2020, 11 MacArthur Fellows have also been affiliated as faculty or alumni.

== Demographics and diversity ==
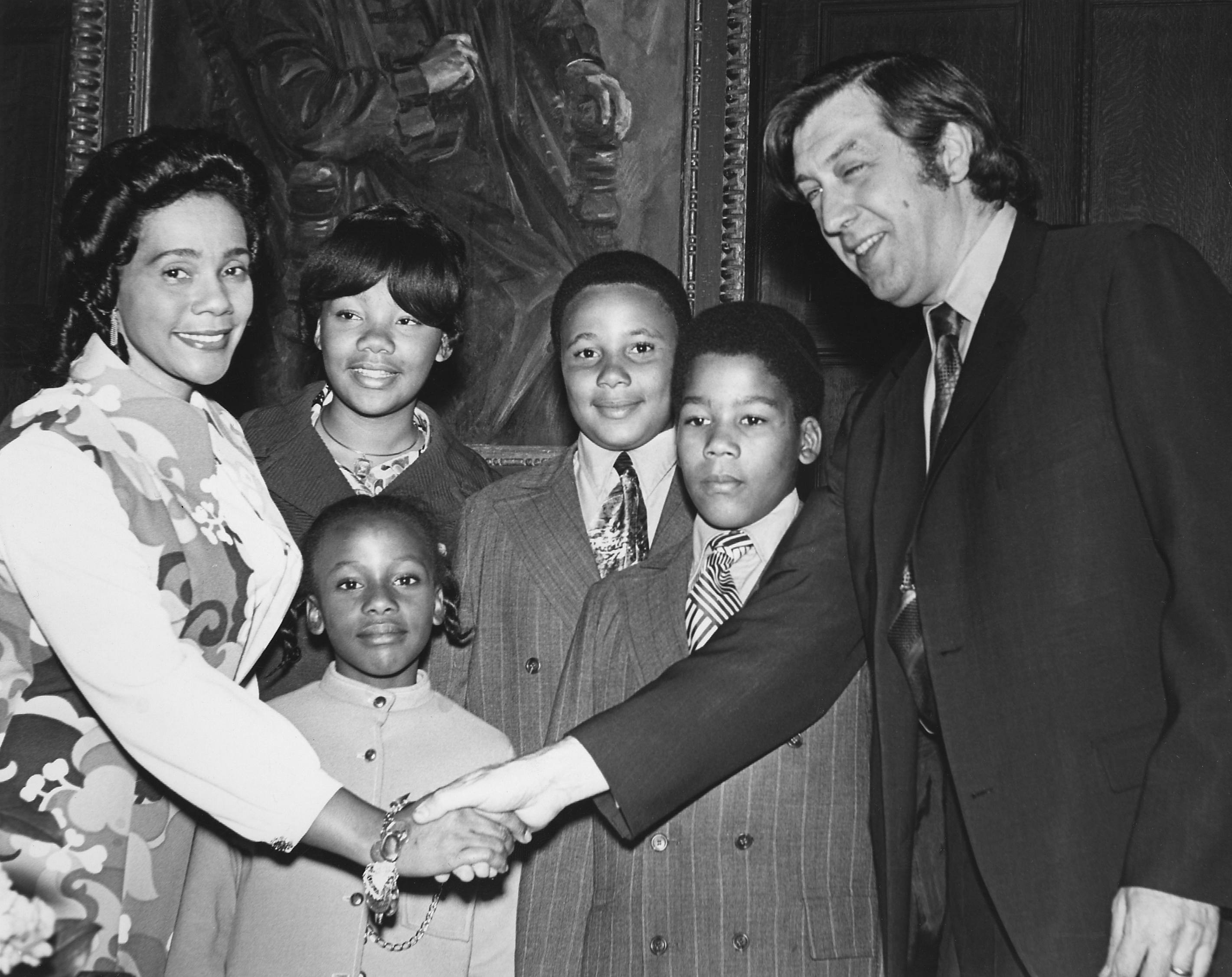
Coretta Scott King, NEC alumna and widow of Dr. Martin Luther King Jr., accompanied by her children, shakes hands with NEC President Gunther Schuller in Jordan Hall, May 1971.

NEC has always accepted students regardless of their race. The first African American to receive a diploma from NEC was Rachel M. Washington, who earned a diploma in voice in 1872. Puerto-Rican pianist Jesus Maria Sanroma received his diploma from NEC in 1920, while the first Black students to earn bachelor's degrees were Anna Bobbitt (Gardner) and Luther Fuller, both in 1932.

Some of NEC's most famous African American alumni include Florence Price, Coretta Scott King, J. Rosamond Johnson, Cecil Taylor, D. Antoinette Handy, McHenry Boatwright, Buckner Gamby, and Denyce Graves. NEC's Black faculty members have included talents such as Jaki Byard, George Russell, Geri Allen, and Carl Atkins.

NEC also has a long history of awarding honorary degrees to many significant artists, such as Roland Hayes (1961), Marian Anderson (1964), Shinichi Suzuki (1966), Coretta Scott King (1971), William Grant Still (1973), Seiji Ozawa (1982), Miles Davis (1986), John Birks "Dizzy" Gillespie (1991), Ravi Shankar (1993), Aretha Franklin (1997), Ali Akbar Khan (2000), Jose Antonio Abreu (2002), Halim El-Dabh (2007), Quincy Jones (2010), Kyung Wha Chun (2015), Sofia Gubaidulina (2017), Herbie Hancock (2018), Chou Wen-chung (2019), Jessye Norman (2019), Mavis Staples (2021), Wu Man (2021), and Ella Jenkins (2022).

== Nomenclature ==
Although the institution is known today as New England Conservatory, both the National Historic Landmark and the National Register of Historic Places nominations designate "New England Conservatory of Music" as the name listed in these registries. Both registries list NEC's primary building, which includes Jordan Hall, as a place of historic significance.

== See also ==
- Amy Beach (president, Board of Councilors)
- List of National Historic Landmarks in Boston
- National Register of Historic Places listings in southern Boston, Massachusetts
