= Samuel Cary =

Samuel Cary may refer to:

- Samuel Fenton Cary (1814–1900), Ohio congressman
- Samuel Eddy Cary (1886–1961), Kansas and Colorado lawyer
