= Armada, Michigan =

- Village
- Motto: "A Rich Past and a Bright Future"
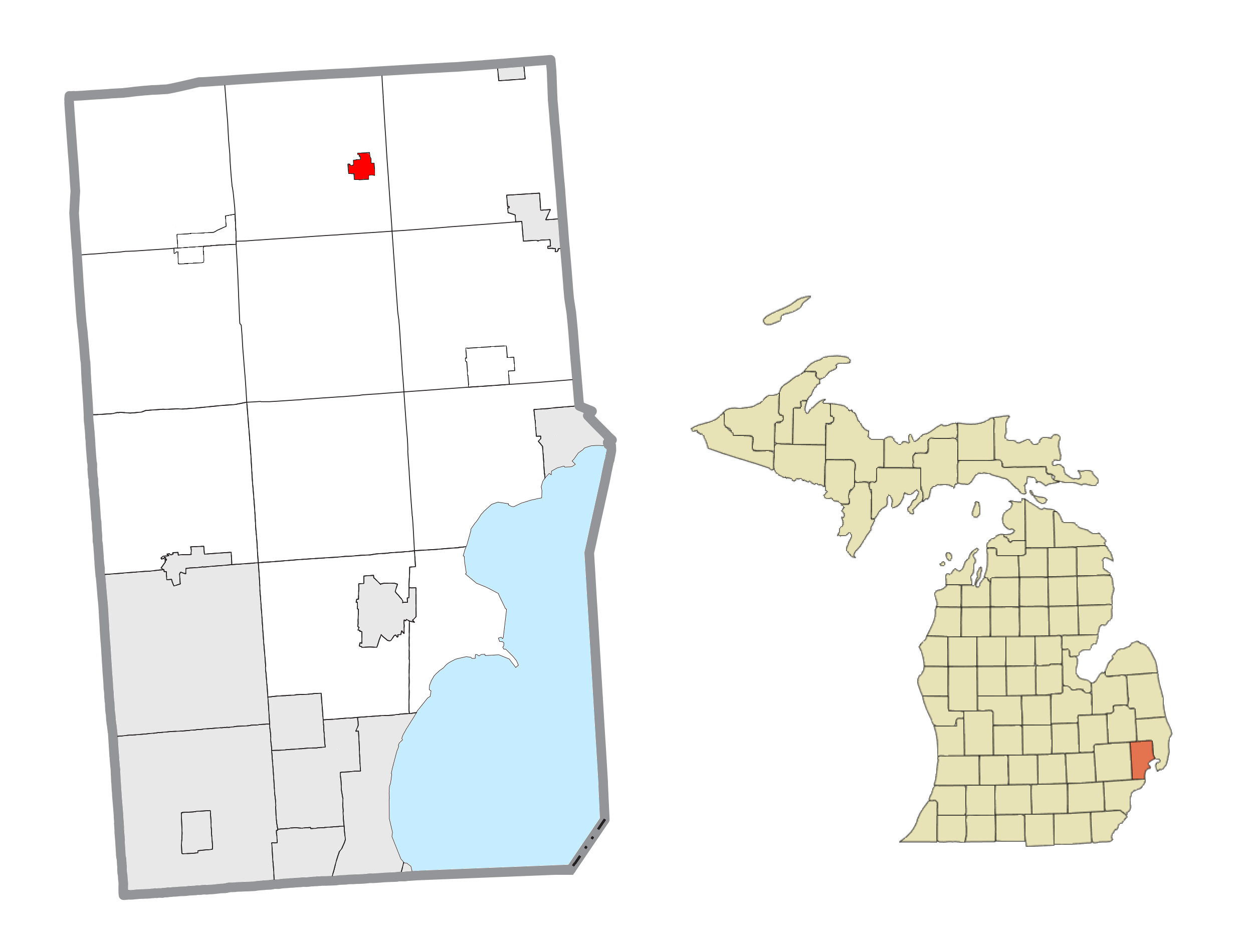
- Location within Macomb County

- Location within Michigan Location within the United States
- Coordinates: 42°50′33″N 82°52′58″W
- Country: United States
- State: Michigan
- County: Macomb
- Township: Armada

Government
  - Type: Village council
  - President: Marvin Wolak

Area
  - Total: 0.74 sq mi (1.91 km^{2})
  - Land: 0.74 sq mi (1.91 km^{2})
  - Water: 0 sq mi (0.00 km^{2})
- Elevation: 745 ft (227 m)

Population (2020)
  - Total: 1,684
  - Density: 2,284.3/sq mi (881.96/km^{2})
- Time zone: UTC-5 (Eastern (EST))
  - Summer (DST): UTC-4 (EDT)
- ZIP Code: 48005
- Area code: 586
- FIPS code: 26-03520
- GNIS feature ID: 2397987
- Website: www.villageofarmada.org

Armada (/ɑːrˈmeɪdə/ ar-MAY-də) is a village in Macomb County in the U.S. state of Michigan. The population was 1,684 at the 2020 census. The village is located within Armada Township. It is best known for its annual Armada Fair.

== History ==
The first record of land purchased in the area that became Armada Township was made by John Proctor in 1825. Twenty-three more families had bought land in the rural area by 1832. Until that year the area was part of Ray Township. At that time a meeting was called to organize a separate township. The vote won by two and Armada Township was founded. When the discussion began to choose the name for the new township, legend says that "Hosea Northrup jumped up and shouted the name 'Armada'". The name was accepted.

Several communities were founded within the township, which was originally developed for agriculture. What became the village of Armada was founded in 1833 by Elijah Burke; it was originally called "Burke's Corners" after him. The village began to prosper when residents improved the old Indian trail for use as a roadway in the early 1830s. The road soon became part of the immigrant and migrant road network between Romeo and Port Huron, Michigan. Today this is known as Armada Ridge Road.

Burke's Corners was briefly renamed "Honeoye", for the New York hometown of several newly arrived migrants. When the village was finally incorporated in the late 1860s, it was officially named "Armada", the same as the township. By then the village had about 800 inhabitants.

During the late nineteenth and early twentieth centuries, the village had a stagecoach stop, an opera house, a theater, seven grocery stores, three hotels, three hardware stores, a lumberyard, a grain mill, two implement dealers, a bakery, five doctors, several blacksmiths shops, and a drug store.

The first school in Armada was a one-room schoolhouse located at Selleck's Corners. Soon schools were built all around the township. These one-room schools were consolidated during the 1940s. At that time, children were bused into town to attend the schools of the consolidated district.

Armada's interest in education was demonstrated in the early 20th century by their applying to the Carnegie Foundation for matching funds in order to build and operate a public library. Andrew Carnegie's program was based on providing grants to villages and towns that would both provide matching funds for construction and commit to supporting all operations and maintenance of libraries. The residents committee of the township asked for $8,000 toward building a permanent township library. The Armada Free Public Library was built in 1915 and is still being used to provide library service in the early 21st century.

A number of fraternal organizations, a literary club, a science club, and the Armada Cornet Band were among the social outlets for villagers and township residents.

The Michigan Air Line Railway connected Armada to other cities in Michigan and elsewhere. Passengers and freight were processed through the two-door depot at the foot of Church Street. A cartage company delivered the freight to uptown businesses by horse and wagon.

In 2014, the village was shut down due to an investigation by Michigan State Police and the FBI of the murder of 14-year-old April Millsap, who was walking her dog on the Macomb Orchard Trail. Her body was found just outside the village limits. In 2016 a jury found the 34-year-old defendant, James VanCallis, a man from St. Clair County, to be guilty of four counts associated with the murder. He was sentenced to life in prison.

Following this, residents came together to support their community. In a July 2019 Reader's Digest vote, Armada was selected as the "Nicest Place in Michigan". It was a finalist for the magazine's "50 Nicest Places in America" story.

== Geography ==
Armada is in northern Macomb County, 18 miles (29 km) north of Mount Clemens, the county seat; 28 miles (45 km) southwest of Port Huron, and 39 miles (63 km) north-northeast of downtown Detroit. According to the United States Census Bureau, the village has a total area of 0.74 square miles (1.92 km^{2}), of which 0.002 square miles (0.005 km^{2}), or 0.27%, are water. The East Branch of Coon Creek passes through the center of the village, part of the Clinton River watershed flowing to Lake St. Clair.

== Demographics ==
Historical population
Census	Pop.	Note	%±
1870	494		—
1880	556		12.6%
1890	638		14.7%
1900	863		35.3%
1910	748		−13.3%
1920	711		−4.9%
1930	840		18.1%
1940	865		3.0%
1950	961		11.1%
1960	1,111		15.6%
1970	1,352		21.7%
1980	1,392		3.0%
1990	1,548		11.2%
2000	1,573		1.6%
2010	1,730		10.0%
2020	1,684		−2.7%
U.S. Decennial Census

=== 2020 census ===
As of the 2020 census, Armada had a population of 1,684. The median age was 44.1 years. 20.4% of residents were under the age of 18 and 21.1% of residents were 65 years of age or older. For every 100 females there were 85.7 males, and for every 100 females age 18 and over there were 83.2 males age 18 and over.

0.0% of residents lived in urban areas, while 100.0% lived in rural areas.

There were 618 households in Armada, of which 33.8% had children under the age of 18 living in them. Of all households, 53.7% were married-couple households, 14.4% were households with a male householder and no spouse or partner present, and 26.7% were households with a female householder and no spouse or partner present. About 23.7% of all households were made up of individuals and 13.1% had someone living alone who was 65 years of age or older.

There were 652 housing units, of which 5.2% were vacant. The homeowner vacancy rate was 0.8% and the rental vacancy rate was 10.7%.

Racial composition as of the 2020 census
Race	Number	Percent
White	1,580	93.8%
Black or African American	5	0.3%
American Indian and Alaska Native	4	0.2%
Asian	4	0.2%
Native Hawaiian and Other Pacific Islander	0	0.0%
Some other race	9	0.5%
Two or more races	82	4.9%
Hispanic or Latino (of any race)	41	2.4%

=== 2010 census ===
As of the census of 2010, there were 1,730 people, 607 households, and 425 families residing in the village. The population density was 2,276.3 inhabitants per square mile (878.9/km^{2}). There were 656 housing units at an average density of 863.2 per square mile (333.3/km^{2}). The racial makeup of the village was 98.0% White, 0.3% African American, 0.1% Native American, 0.1% Asian, 0.1% Pacific Islander, 0.4% from other races, and 0.9% from two or more races. Hispanic or Latino of any race were 2.6% of the population.

There were 607 households, of which 40.2% had children under the age of 18 living with them, 55.7% were married couples living together, 10.7% had a female householder with no husband present, 3.6% had a male householder with no wife present, and 30.0% were non-families. 25.7% of all households were made up of individuals, and 11.9% had someone living alone who was 65 years of age or older. The average household size was 2.73 and the average family size was 3.30.

The median age in the village was 38.6 years. 27.9% of residents were under the age of 18; 8.3% were between the ages of 18 and 24; 24% were from 25 to 44; 24.8% were from 45 to 64; and 15.1% were 65 years of age or older. The gender makeup of the village was 47.3% male and 52.7% female.

=== 2000 census ===
As of the census of 2000, there were 1,573 people, 540 households, and 408 families residing in the village. The population density was 2,221.8 inhabitants per square mile (857.8/km^{2}). There were 558 housing units at an average density of 788.2 per square mile (304.3/km^{2}). The racial makeup of the village was 97.71% White, 0.19% African American, 0.57% Native American, 0.13% Asian, 0.06% Pacific Islander, 0.19% from other races, and 1.14% from two or more races. Hispanic or Latino of any race were 1.65% of the population.

There were 540 households, out of which 42.2% had children under the age of 18 living with them, 63.3% were married couples living together, 8.0% had a female householder with no husband present, and 24.4% were non-families. 21.3% of all households were made up of individuals, and 7.6% had someone living alone who was 65 years of age or older. The average household size was 2.81 and the average family size was 3.29.

In the village, the population dispersal was 29.2% under the age of 18, 7.8% from 18 to 24, 30.8% from 25 to 44, 21.3% from 45 to 64, and 10.9% who were 65 years of age or older. The median age was 34 years. For every 100 females, there were 90.0 males. For every 100 females age 18 and over, there were 90.4 males.

The median income for a household in the village was $61,700, and the median income for a family was $69,917. Males had a median income of $50,795 versus $32,330 for females. The per capita income for the village was $22,446. About 2.9% of families and 3.6% of the population were below the poverty line, including 3.8% of those under age 18 and 6.5% of those age 65 or over.

== Attractions ==
A country fair has been held in the village each August since 1872.

A Halloween festival, Armada-geddon, is held in the village each year on the second Saturday in October. It celebrates the fall, fun, and all things spooky. The event includes a 5k-walk, run and shamble; a street fair with craft vendors and food; games and activities for children; and, in the evening, a lighted Halloween Parade.

== Notable people ==
- Dick Enberg, sports announcer; attended high school in Armada
- Martha Griffiths, 59th Lieutenant Governor of Michigan; lived and died in Armada
- Ben Stephens, American baseball pitcher; died in Armada
