= Sam Cary =

Sam Cary may refer to:

- Sam Angel (soccer) (born 2000), American soccer player formerly known as Sam Cary
- Samuel Fenton Cary (1814–1900), Ohio congressman
- Samuel Eddy Cary (1886–1961), Kansas and Colorado lawyer
