= Romeo Historic District =

Historic district in Michigan, United States

- U.S. National Register of Historic Places
- U.S. Historic district
- Michigan State Historic Site
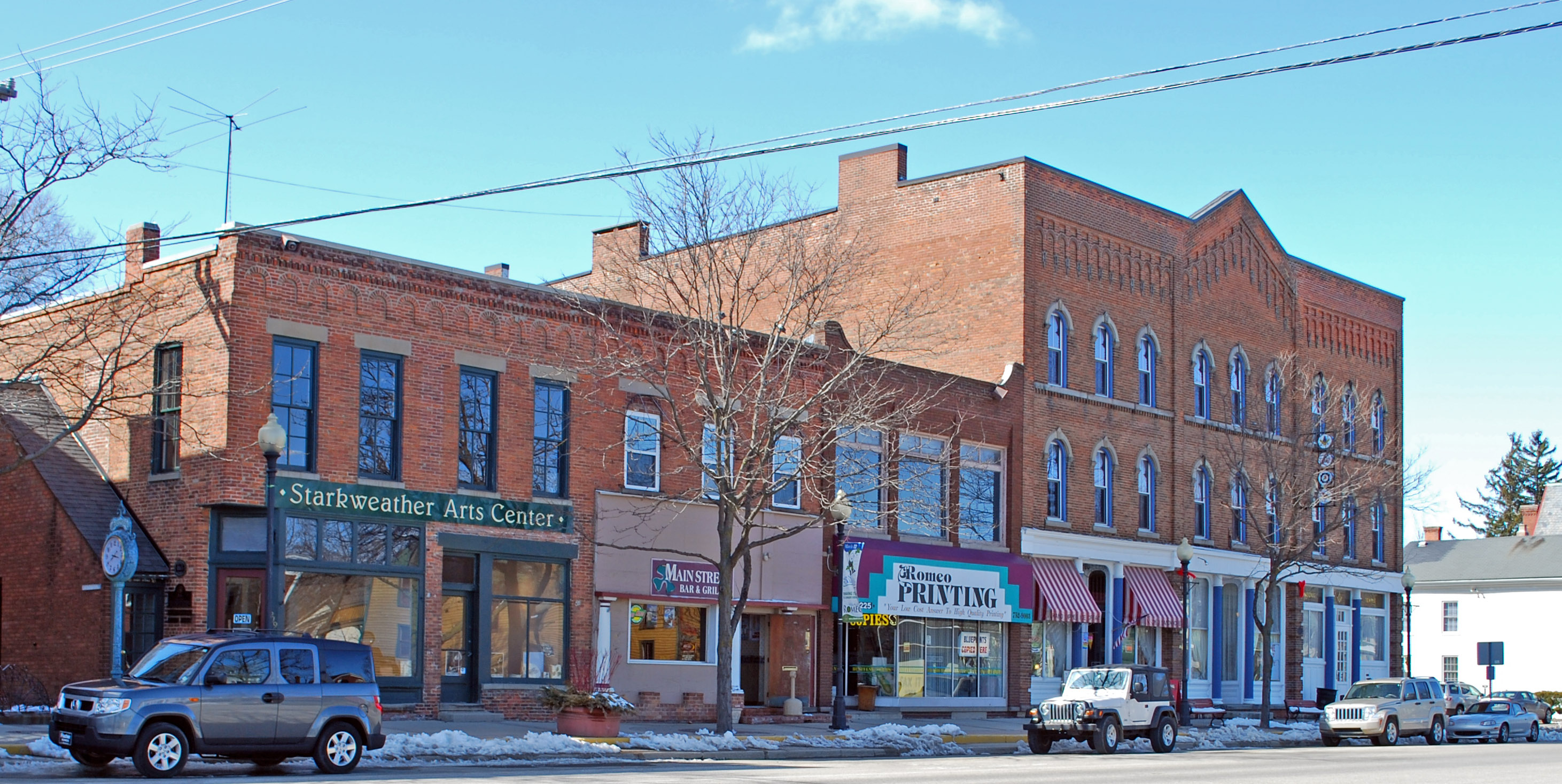
- 100 block of North Main Street, west side

- Location within Michigan Location within the United States
- Interactive map
- Location: Roughly bounded by the corporate lines of Romeo, Michigan
- Coordinates: 42°48′7″N 83°0′51″W
- NRHP reference No.: 70000281

Significant dates
- Added to NRHP: July 8, 1970
- Designated MSHS: April 24, 1970

The Romeo Historic District is a historic district roughly bounded by the corporate lines of Romeo, Michigan. It was listed on the National Register of Historic Places in 1970 and designated a Michigan State Historic Site in 1970.

== History ==
The area around Romeo was first settled in 1821, and in 1822 the first building was constructed in what was then known as "Hoxie's Settlement." The first piece of the present-day village, extending two blocks in each direction from the corner of St. Claire and Main Streets, was platted by Col. John B. Hollister in 1830. By 1837 a number of simple log farmhouses dotted the area, and the settlement boasted over 200 people, 34 houses, three dry goods stores, a wagon shop, tannery, shoe shops, a foundry, a cooper shop, carpenter shop and a hoopskirt factory. Hoxie's Settlement was incorporated as the village of Romeo in 1838. The University of Michigan established a branch campus, the Romeo Academy, in the area in the 1840, attracting more prosperous academics and professionals to the area. A railroad was laid through the village in 1869, bringing increased trade. Planned growth has allowed the Romeo community to maintain a high degree of historic integrity.

== Description ==
The Romeo Historic District contains approximately 100 well-preserved historic structures, constructed in a variety of architectural styles. Most are frame structures, including a number of Gothic Revival cottages, but the district also includes substantial brick buildings located along Romeo's main street.

Romeo Images
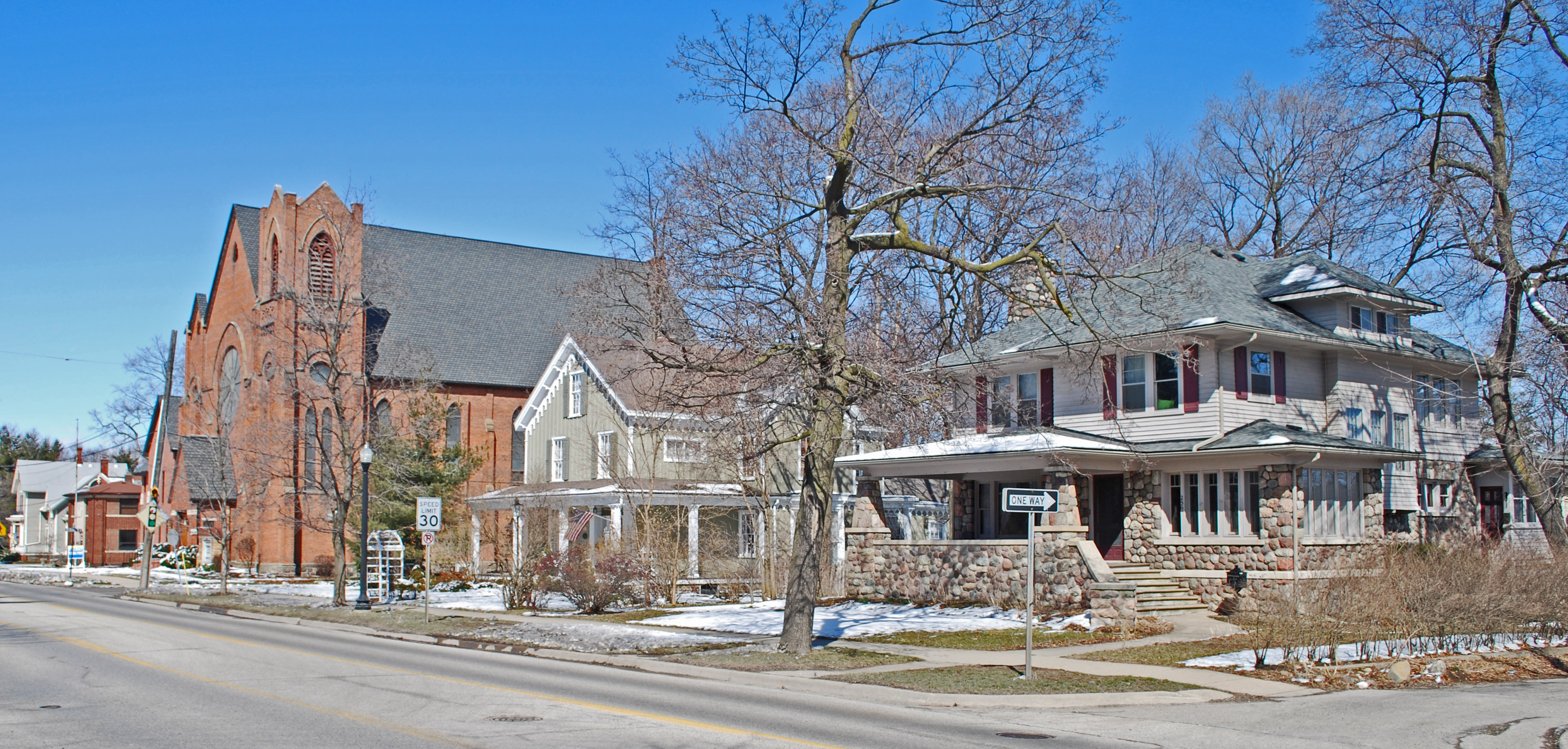
200 block of North Main, west side

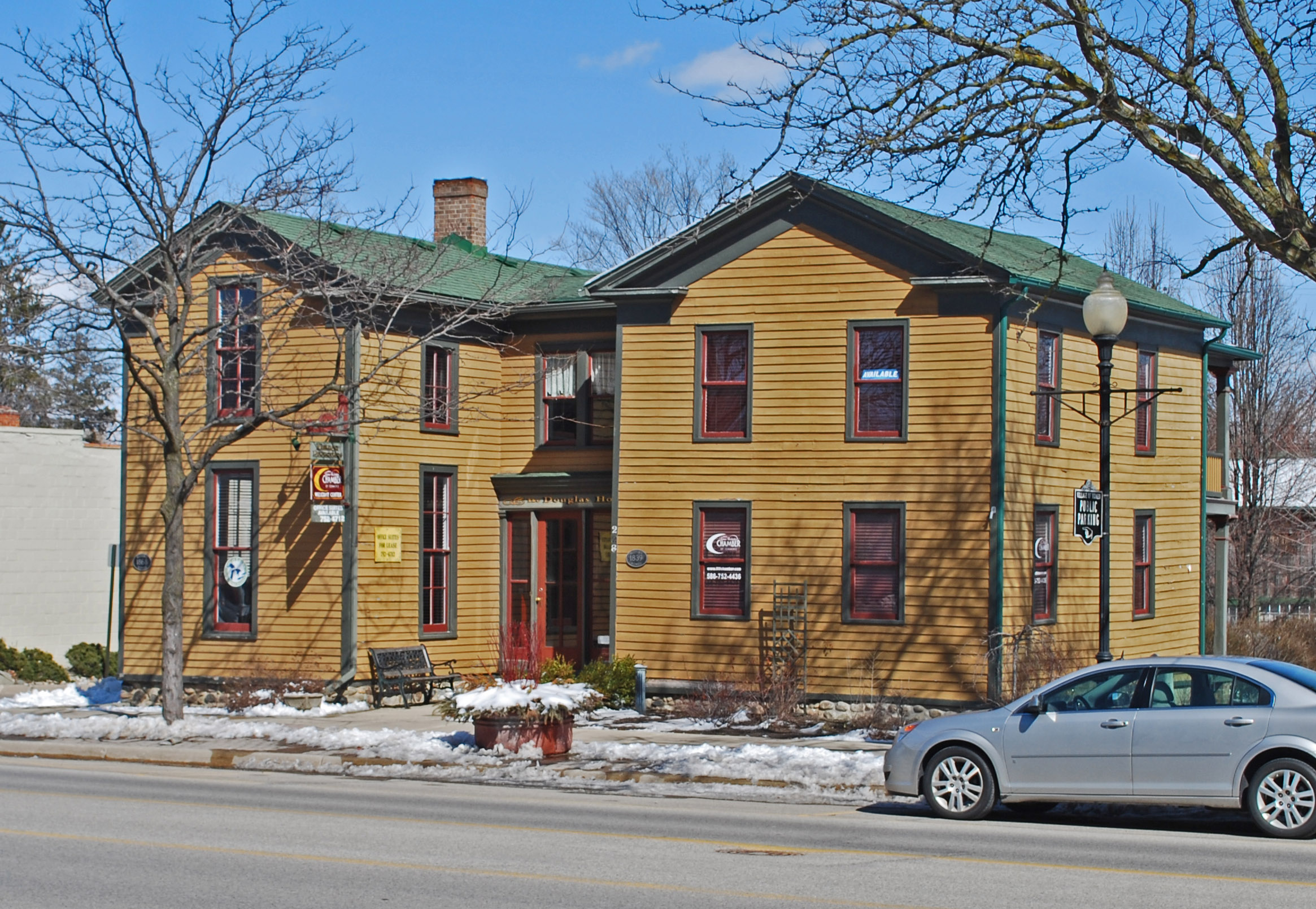
100 block of North Main, east side

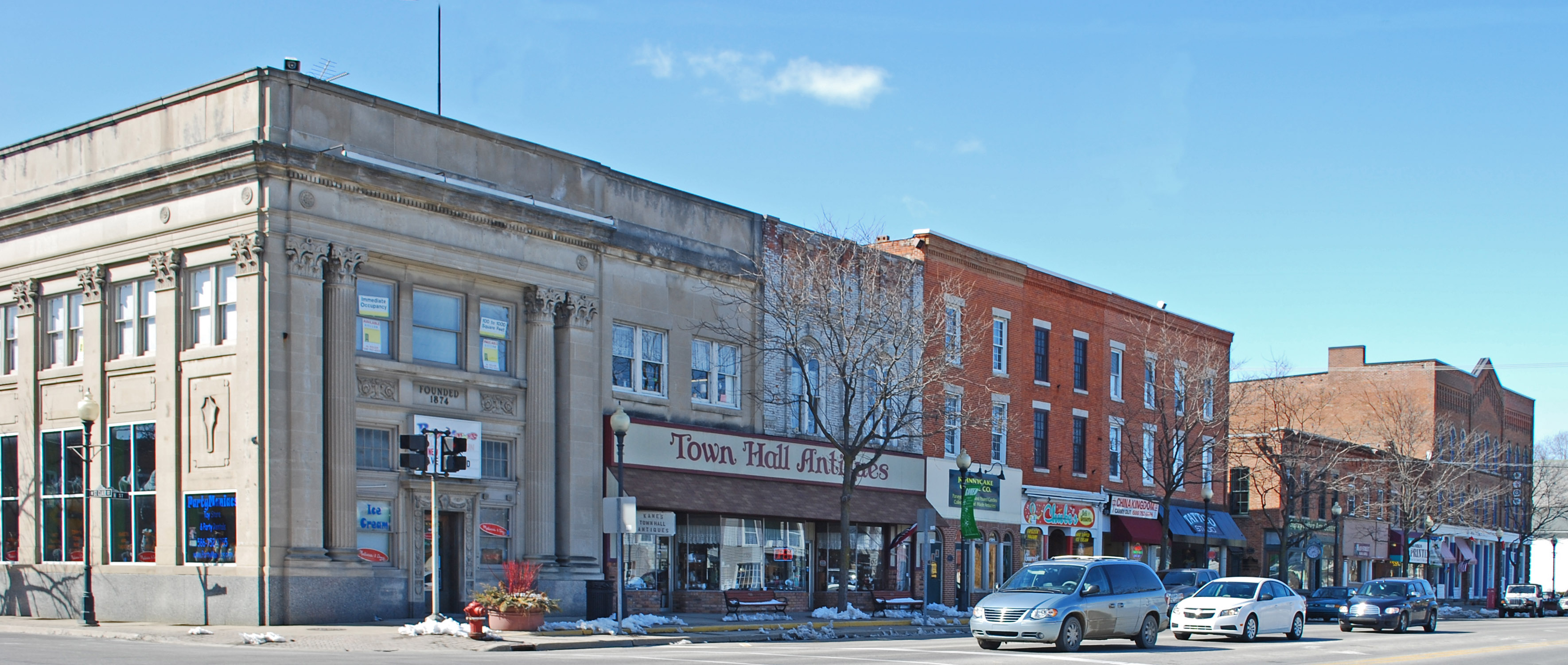
100 block of North Main, west side

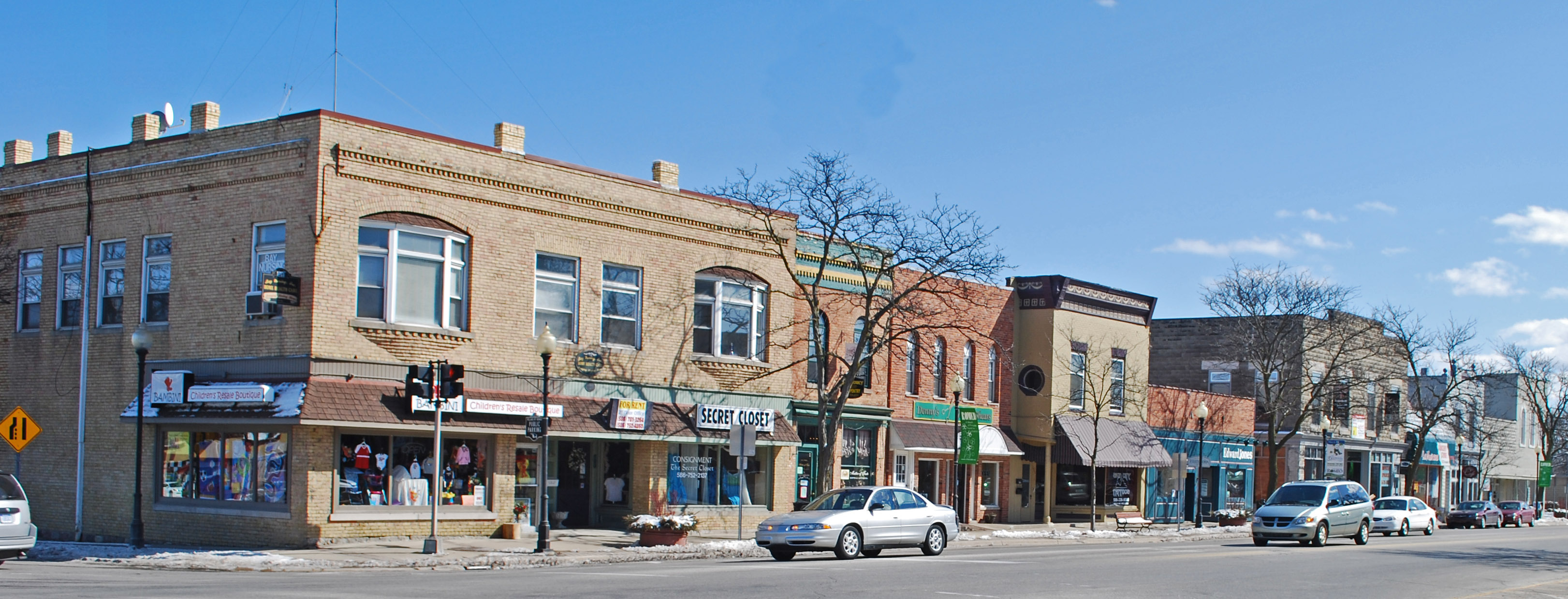
100 block of South Main, east side

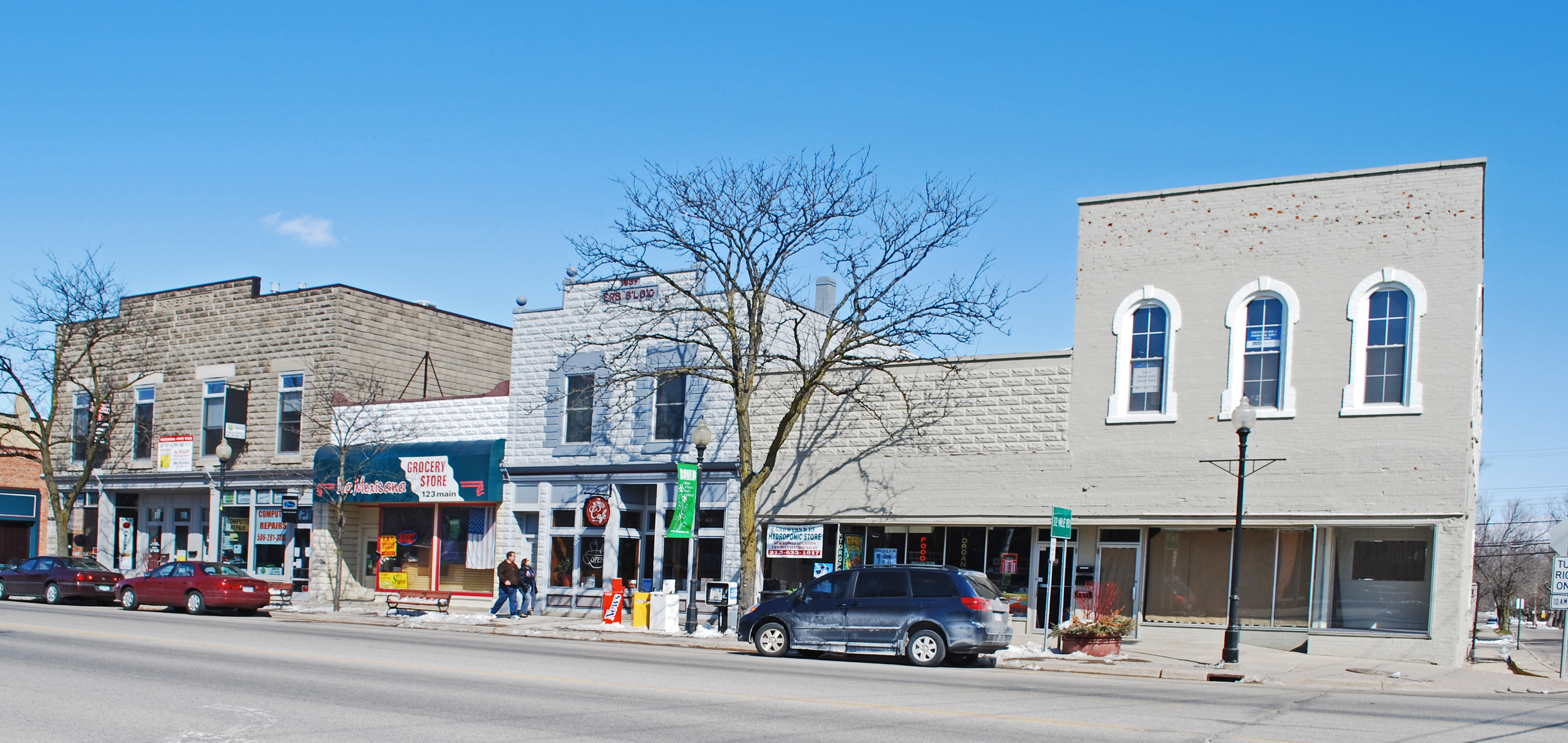
100 block of South Main, east side

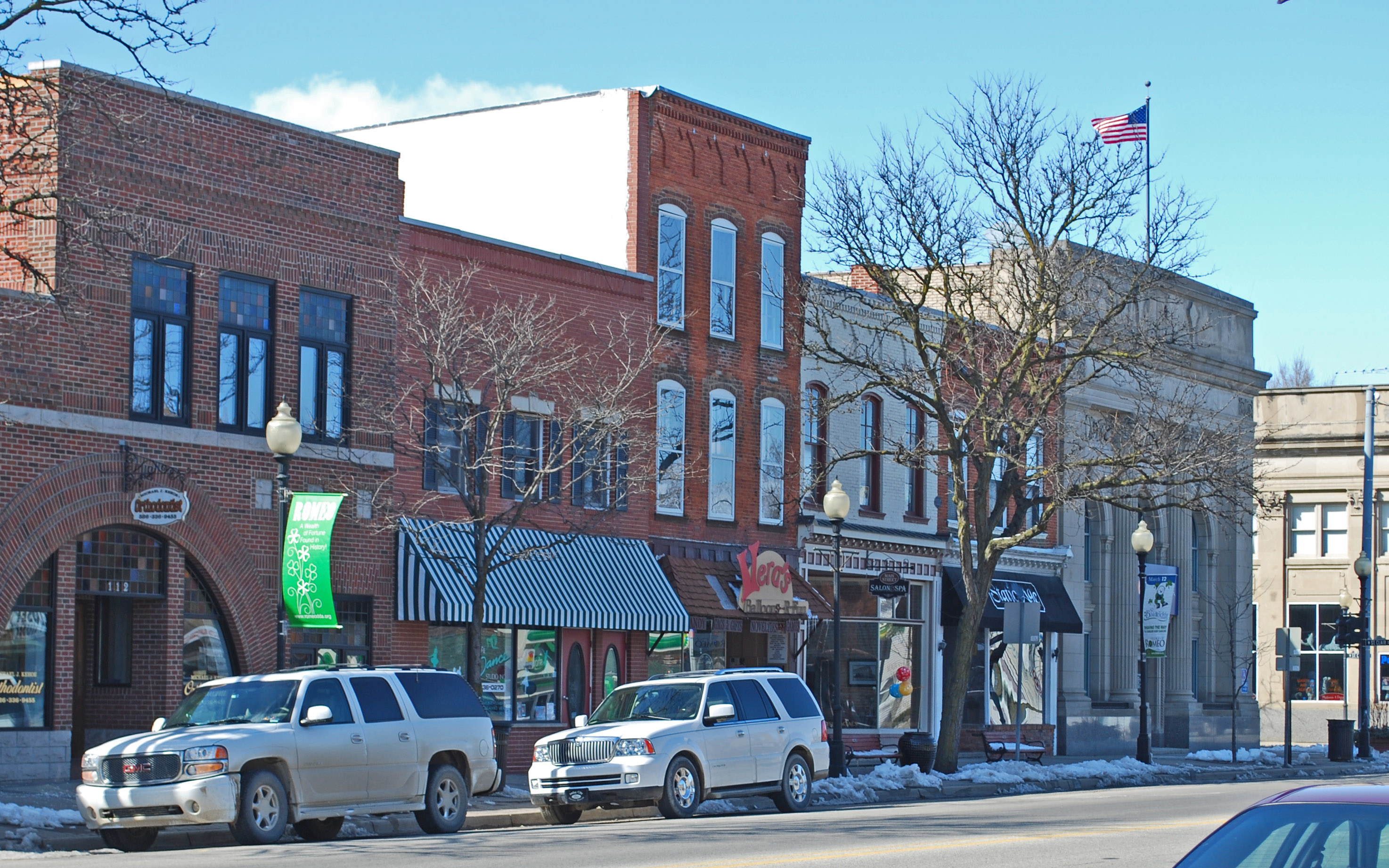
100 block of South Main, west side

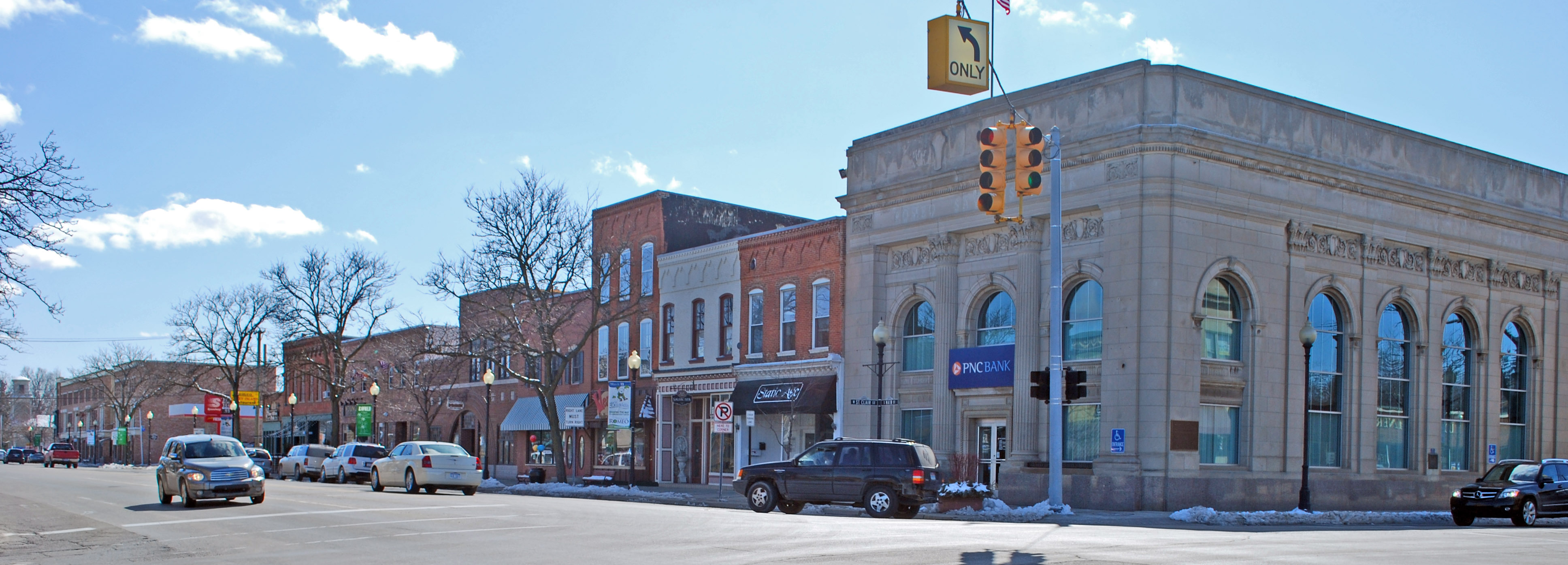
100 block of South Main, west side

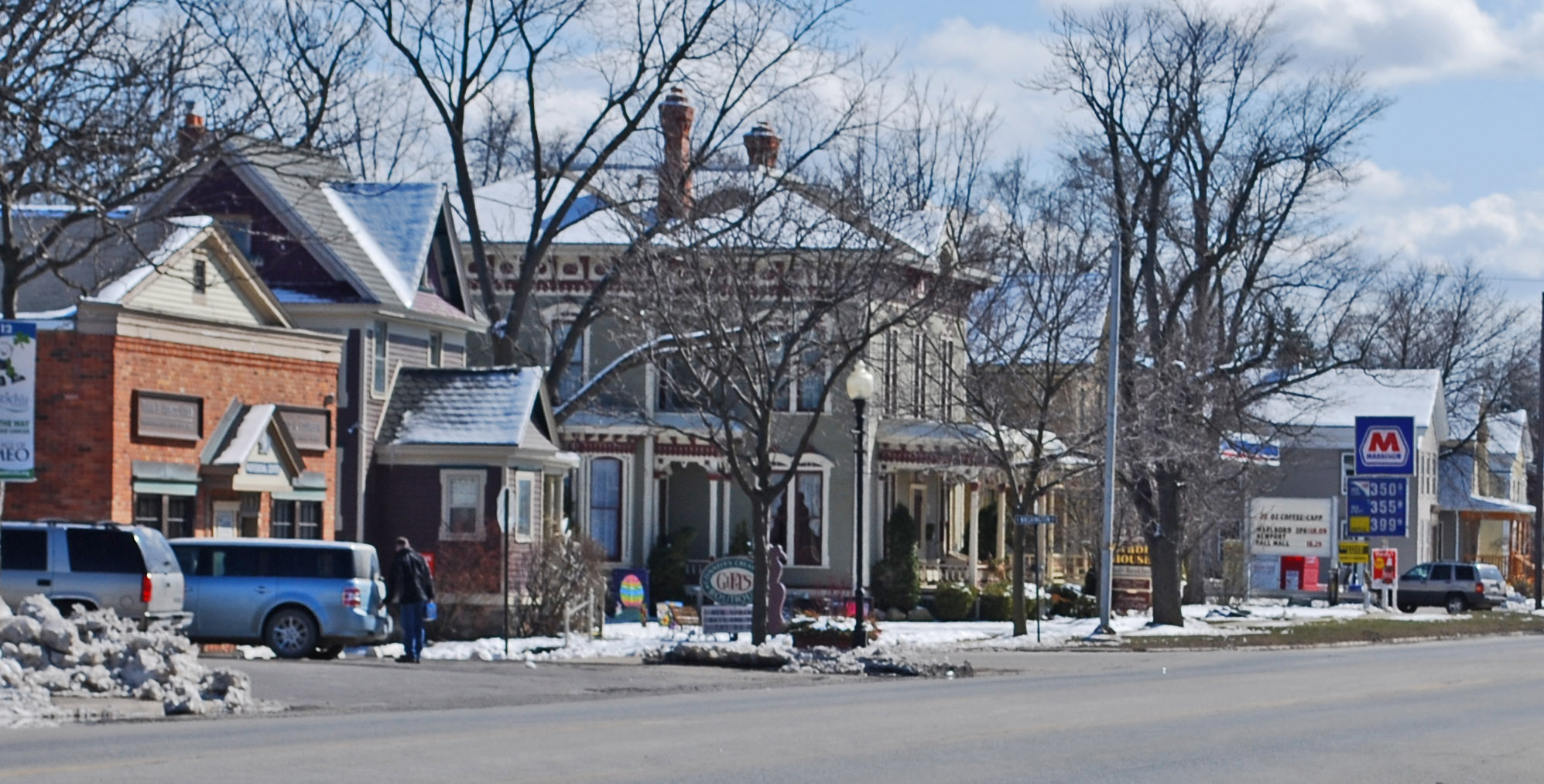
200 block of South Main, east side

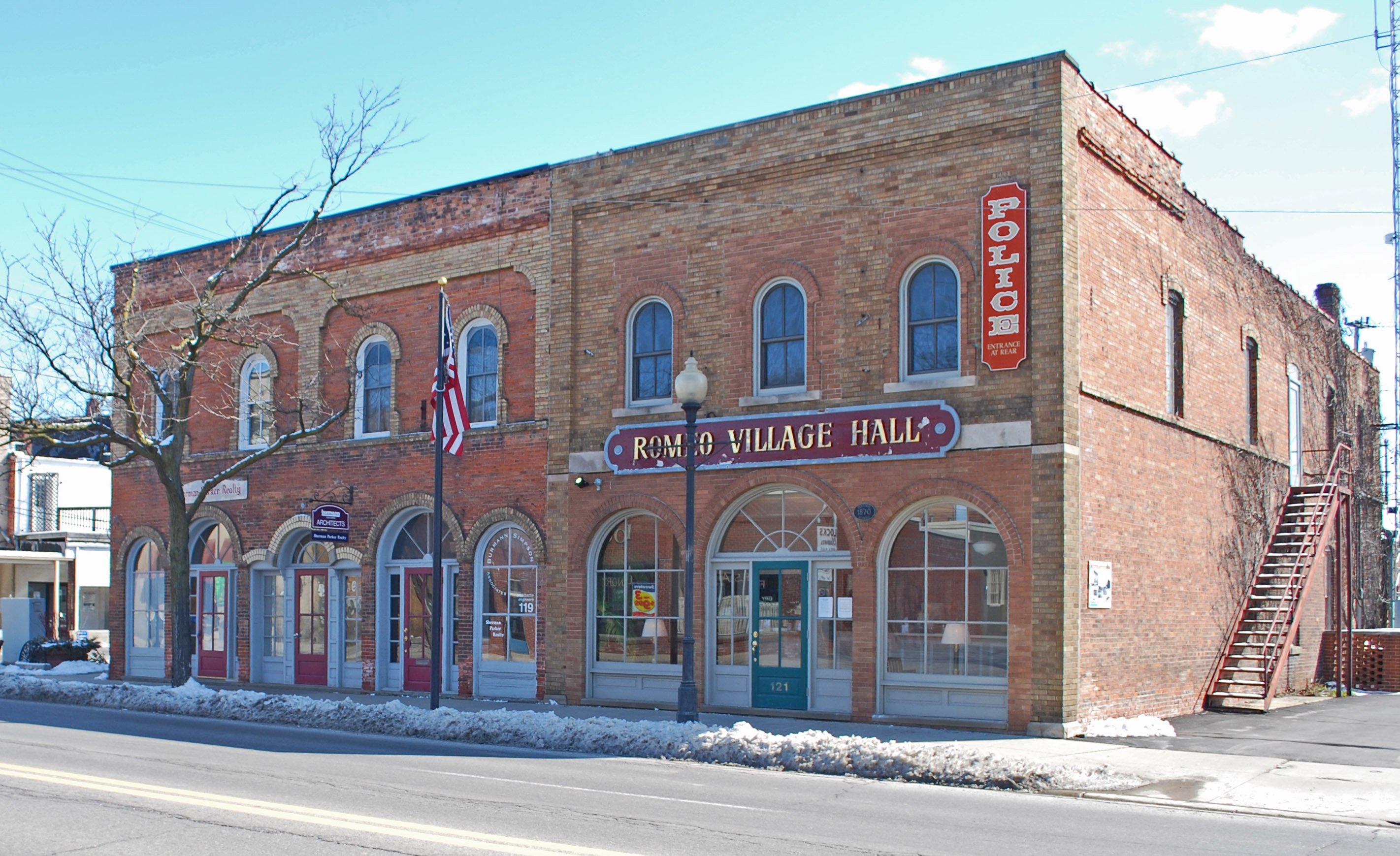
100 block of West 32 Mile Rd, south side

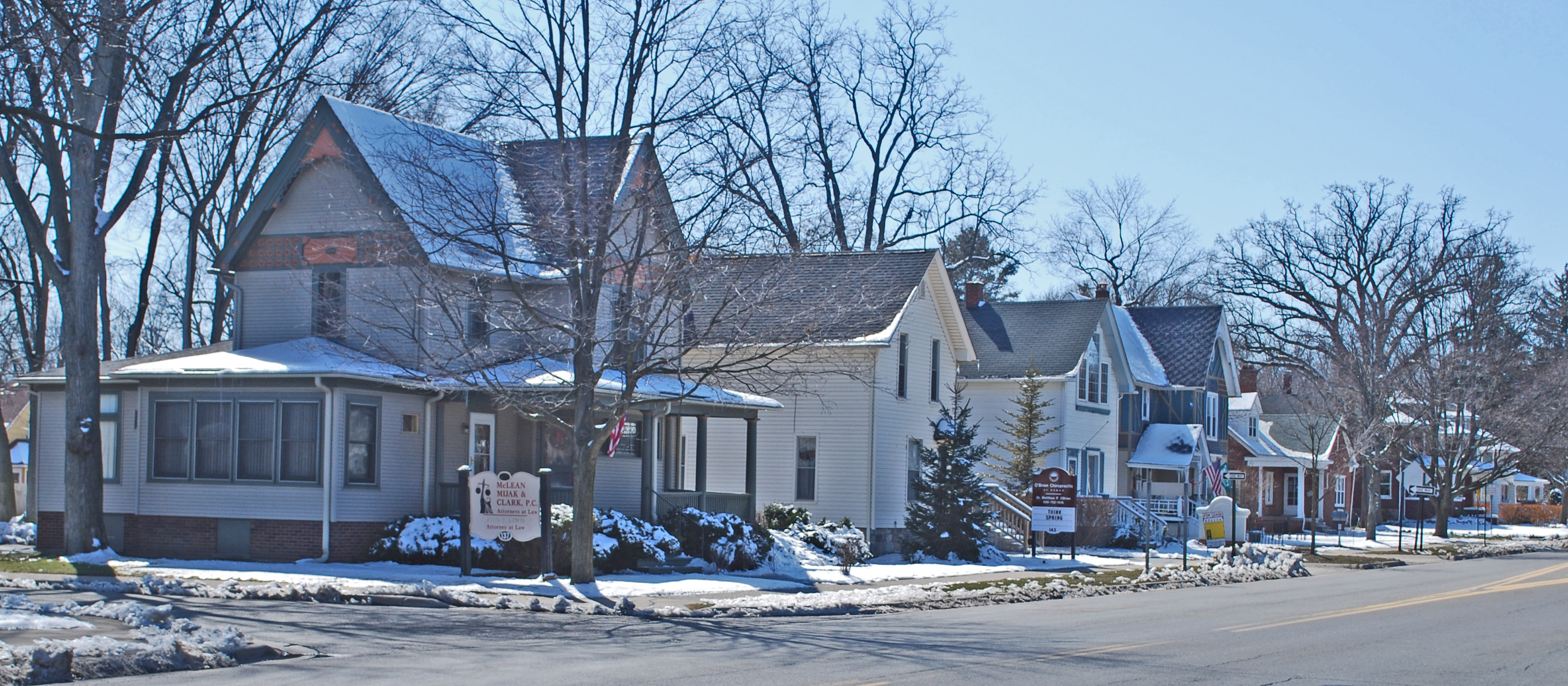
100 block of West 32 Mile Rd, south side
