= Isabele Taliaferro Spiller =

School cofounder, educator, performer (1888–1974)

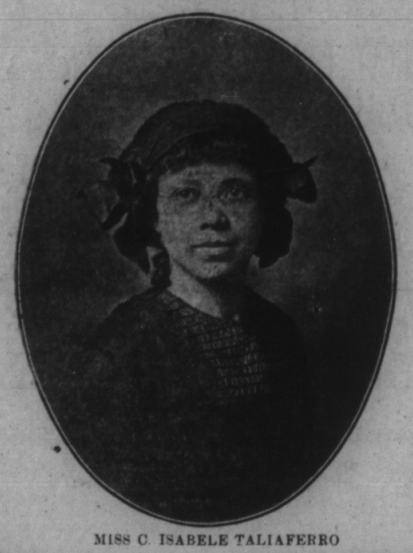
- Isabele Taliaferro in 1914
- Born: Cary Isabele Taliaferro; March 18, 1888; Abingdon, Virginia
- Died: May 14, 1974 (aged 86); Harlem, New York City
- Resting place: Fair Lawn Memorial Cemetery, Fair Lawn, New Jersey
- Education: New England Conservatory of Music, Teachers College, Columbia University
- Occupations: Musician, school co-founder, music educator
- Spouse: William Newmeyer Spiller (m. 1918)

Isabele Taliaferro Spiller (née Taliaferro; March 18, 1888 – May 14, 1974) was an African-American school co-founder, music educator, and performer.

== Early life ==
Isabele Spiller was born Cary Isabele Taliaferro on March 17, 1888, in Abingdon, Virginia, the elder of two daughters born to Granville L. Taliaferro, a minister, and Josephine Outlaw Taliaferro. She was educated in Philadelphia public schools, and received her first musical instruction from her mother. She regularly attended concerts at various venues around Philadelphia, including Wanamaker's Department Store, the Academy of Music, St. Peter Claver's Church, and Willow Grove Park. She played organ, piano, and mandolin in the Taliaferro family orchestra, for which her mother played guitar, as well as playing piano at her father's church. Isabele graduated from Girls Commercial High School, before gaining a teaching certificate from the New England Conservatory of Music in Boston, as well as studying at the Juilliard School of Music. She received further musical training from Emma Azalia Hackley and Melville Charlton, in voice and theory respectively.

== The Musical Spillers ==
In 1912, Isabele Taliaferro joined the Musical Spillers, a famous vaudeville act, performing as a sextet. The group's founder and leader was William Newmeyer Spiller, who Isabele married on August 25, 1918. The Musical Spillers toured widely, travelling around the US, Canada, Mexico, South America, Europe, and the Caribbean. They also made a silent film with Alice Brady. The Musical Spillers were unique in performing both jazz and classical works, as well as for being one of the largest black acts of the early 1900s.

Isabele Spiller was an accomplished performer, playing tenor saxophone as her primary instrument, as well as alto and baritone saxophone, trumpet, and piano. She also acted as the group's assistant manager. Her sister, Bessie Taliaferro, also played with the Musical Spillers, and a number of prominent 1920s musicians got their start with the group. Among these were Rex Stewart, who went on to perform with Duke Ellington, Cricket Smith, Russell Smith, Noble Sissle, and Willie Lewis. A reporter for the Chicago Defender wrote, in 1925:

Mrs. Spiller tickles a mean set of ivories and toots a mean moaning saxophone, too.

After the Spillers established their school in 1925, Isabele Spiller no longer performed with the Musical Spillers, but she remained an active performer. However, from the 1920s her major impact was as an educator and musical director.

== Spiller School of Music ==
William and Isabele Spiller bought a home on Striver's Row in Harlem in 1920, among the city's black elite. Here, they met W. C. Handy, Leigh Whipper, Bill Robinson, J. Rosamond Johnson, Leontyne Price, and Will Marion Cook, who met regularly at the Spillers' house. In 1925, responding to the needs of Harlem's black musicians who could not attend white schools, and could not read music but were exceptionally talented players, the Spillers founded a school. Theirs was one of at least seven music schools founded by black musicians in Harlem during the first half of the 20th century. Years later, Bessie Taliaferro recalled William Spiller's lessons for self-trained musicians, telling the New York Times:

You got to listen while he played and you got it that way... They already knew how to play; they just didn't know how to read. His students were fellows who just played, played, played but they didn't know what they were playing.

The Spiller school became known as a place where raw talent was nurtured, as well as being a rehearsal studio for accomplished players. When William Spiller returned to performing in 1928, Isabele remained in Harlem and continued to run the school.

Isabele Spiller was recognised by the community for her significant role in supporting the talents of the city's black youth, and has been noted for her importance in developing instrumental music and its tuition in Harlem, particularly through her encouragement of class music instruction on the same basis as other subjects. As well as running her own school, Spiller was Director of Music at the segregated Young Women's Christian Association in Brooklyn, the Moorland Young Men's Christian Association in Plainfield, New Jersey, and in New York public schools. She also directed the music department of the Columbus Hill Community Center (later the Harlem Boy's Club) 1929–1933. While there, she won a scholarship to Teachers College, Columbia University, the only woman in its graduating class.

For ten years from 1942, Spiller was orchestral conductor and teacher of music at Wadleigh High School. Pupils recalled her as an excellent teacher and conductor, who would also keep her students up to date with black cultural events. Wadleigh's was the only evening school orchestra in New York City.

In 1952, Spiller accepted her final professional appointment in music education, at Harlem Evening School.

== Federal Music Project ==
Isabele Spiller's "most significant contribution" was said to be her role as supervisor of instrumental music in the education division of New York City's Federal Music Project, undertaken between 1933 and 1941. During these years, Spiller directed eight music centers, supervising woodwind, brass, and percussion, and overseeing a staff of eight teachers: including six white men. Ruth Hannas, a director of music education for the Federal Music Project, described Spiller as:

... one of the most valuable supervisors functioning on the Federal Music Project. Her pedagogical equipment is unusually fine and temperamentally fitted for the work. Her ability to handle difficult people and difficult situations is outstanding. It is unusual to find a woman so well equipped in charge of the Woodwind, Brass, and Percussion program.

In her role with the Federal Music Project, Spiller also worked as music supervisor for the 1939 New York World's Fair.

== Later years and death ==
Spiller retired in 1958, at the age of 70. She conducted the orchestra of the Harlem Evening High School for the last time in June 1958. Her retirement was announced in The Juilliard Review that year. William Spiller had died in 1944, and she lived her final years with her sister Bessie. The two created the Mrs. Josephine Outlaw Taliaferro Scholarship of $100.00 in memory of their mother, to be awarded to a student who is outstanding in vocal or instrumental music'.

Isabele Taliaferro Spiller died on May 14, 1974, in Harlem Hospital. Her funeral was held in Trumbo's Funeral Chapel, and she was buried at Fairlawn Cemetery in New Jersey.
