= Ben Stephens (baseball) =

American baseball player (1867–1896)

- Pitcher
- Born: September 28, 1867; Romeo, Michigan, U.S.
- Died: August 5, 1896 (aged 28); Armada, Michigan, U.S.
- Batted: Unknown Threw: Right

MLB debut
- August 5, 1892, for the Baltimore Orioles

Last MLB appearance
- May 4, 1894, for the Washington Senators

MLB statistics
- Win–loss record: 1–8
- Strikeouts: 23
- Earned run average: 4.64
- Stats at Baseball Reference

Teams
- Baltimore Orioles (1892); Cincinnati Reds (1892); Washington Senators (1893–1894)

George Benjamin Stephens (born September 28, 1867 in Romeo, Michigan – August 5, 1896 in Armada, Michigan), was an American baseball player who played pitcher in the Major Leagues from 1892 to 1894. He played for the Baltimore Orioles, Cincinnati Reds, and Washington Senators.
