= Edwin Henry Hackley =

Lawyer from Colorado

Edwin H. Hackley
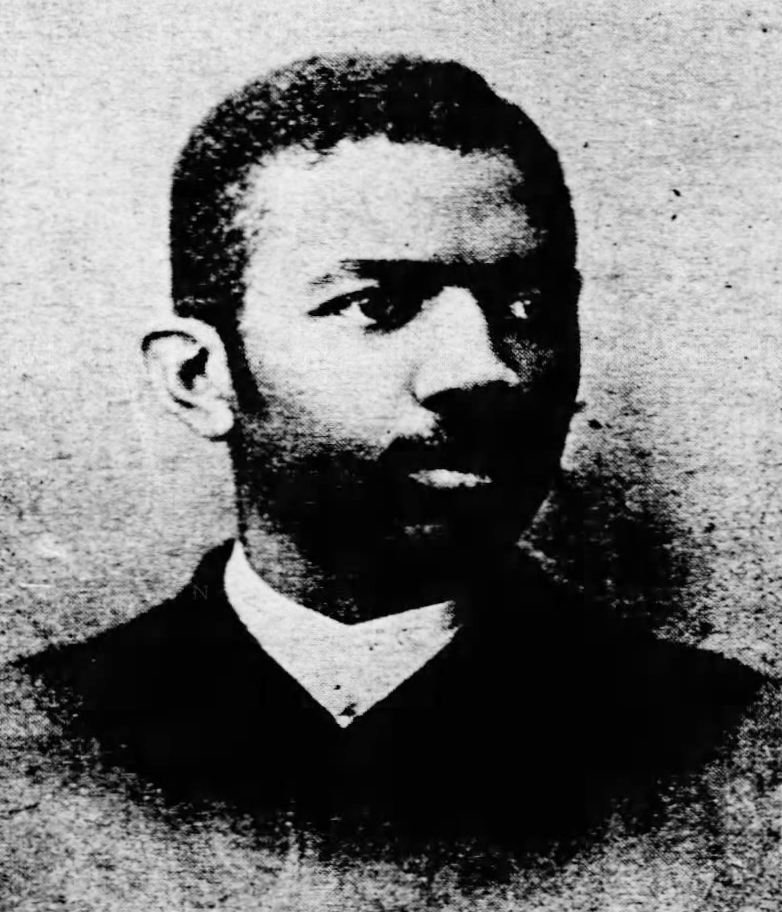
- Born: September 11, 1859; Romeo, Macomb County, Michigan
- Died: July 11, 1940 (aged 80)
- Occupations: lawyer, newspaper publisher and playwright
- Known for: First African American lawyer admitted to the bar in Colorado
- Notable work: The Ambassador
- Spouse: Emma Azalia Hackley

Edwin Henry Hackley, also commonly known as Edwin H. Hackley (1859 – 1940), was the first African-American lawyer admitted to the Colorado Bar Association (1883). Beginning in 1886, he worked as the Denver County Clerk, and then spent almost 14 years as an Abstract Clerk. He practiced law when he could, but after some time he closed his practice because it was not profitable.

He was the editor and publisher of The Statesman, working on the paper from 1892 to until 1901. He wrote the musical comedy play entitled The Ambassador. In 1930, he published Hackley & Harrison's hotel and apartment guide for colored travelers, six years before The Negro Motorist Green Book. He advocated for civil rights and opportunities for advancement of African Americans. The story of his life, A Biography of Edwin Henry Hackley 1859-1940: African-American Attorney and Activist, was published in 2003.

== Personal life and education ==
Hackley was born on September 11, 1859, in Romeo, Michigan. His parents were John Hackley and Susan Belmore Hackley. As a child, he had a case of lung fever, a general term used in the 1800s to mean a form of pneumonia, that affected his health into adulthood. He was raised in a black middle-class family in Romeo. After graduating from high school, Hackley attended the University of Michigan in the early 1800s. Sick with tuberculosis, he completed much of his course work remotely to earn his law degree.

On January 29, 1894, Hackley married Emma A. Smith, becoming Emma Azalia Hackley. Before their marriage, she was a teacher at the Clinton School in Detroit. After she moved to Denver, Azalia trained at a musical conservatory. With high aspirations for her talent, she then was trained in Europe. When she returned to Denver, she was a singer and music instructor. The couple separated after they moved to Philadelphia. (Note: She died on December 13, 1922 at the home of her sister, Mrs. Marieta Johnson, in Detroit, Michigan.) Hackley died on July 11, 1940.

His mother, Susan Hackley, born around 1829, lived in Denver and then Philadelphia, where she died on August 13, 1910.

== Career ==
Upon receiving his law degree, Hackley was admitted to the bar in Michigan in 1883. He traveled to Colorado and was admitted to the Colorado Bar Association on June 7, 1883, becoming the first African American to become a lawyer in Colorado. (Note: There are some sources that state that Samuel Eddy Cary, who did not come to Denver until 1919, was the first African American to have passed the bar in Colorado. There are four men that were attorneys earlier than Cary: starting in 1883 with Hackley, followed by Joseph H. Stuart, Thomas Campbell, and George Ross.) Hackley was fully moved to Denver by 1886. He worked intermittently as a clerk and a lawyer. He worked as the Denver County Clerk beginning in 1886. He practiced law and argued cases in court when he could, but he did not receive enough business to sustain a law practice. He became an Abstract Clerk, a position which he held for almost 14 years.

In 1892, he became the editor and publisher of The Statesman (Denver, Colorado), a paper written for the city's African American–Republican community. (Note: An obituary stated that Stuart co-founded The Colorado Statesman.) His poem Who Led These Men, about the bravery of U.S. Army soldiers during the Spanish–American War, was published in newspapers in 1900. The women's section of the paper was co-edited by Azalia. He sold the paper in 1898 to G. F. Franklin, but continued on as editor until 1901 when Franklin died.

He moved to Philadelphia, Pennsylvania. Away from the responsibilities of running a newspaper, he wrote dramatic compositions, like the musical comedy play titled The Ambassador. It was performed in Philadelphia, Pittsburgh and Denver. In 1930, he published Hackley & Harrison's hotel and apartment guide for colored travelers, six years before The Negro Motorist Green Book was published.

Lisa Pertillar Brevard wrote a biography about him, A Biography of Edwin Henry Hackley 1859-1940: African-American Attorney and Activist that was published in 2003.

== Other ==
Like Henry McNeal Turner, Hackley believed that the only way to resolve racial division in the country was for African Americans emigration to the African continent. The movement to promote emigration was formalized with the founding of the American Colonization Society before the Civil War. After the war, Turner was the key leader what he considered the best way of "bettering the condition and environment of their people". Finding the National Afro-American League ineffective meeting their key goals to create more opportunities for advancement and to realize equitable civil rights for African Americans, Hackley led the establishment of the American Citizen's Constitutional Union in Denver on December 8, 1891.

Hackley was a member of the Colored Odd Fellowship, holding the position of grand master by 1898.

== See also ==
- List of first minority male lawyers and judges in Colorado
- List of African American pioneers of Colorado
