= Carlos F. Lucero =

American judge (born 1940)

Carlos Lucero

Senior Judge of the United States Court of Appeals for the Tenth Circuit
- Incumbent
- Assumed office February 1, 2021

Judge of the United States Court of Appeals for the Tenth Circuit
- In office June 30, 1995 – February 1, 2021
- Appointed by: Bill Clinton
- Preceded by: Seat established
- Succeeded by: Veronica S. Rossman

Personal details
- Born: 1940 (age 84–85) Antonito, Colorado, U.S.
- Education: Adams State University (BA); George Washington University (JD)

Carlos F. Lucero (born 1940) is an American attorney and jurist serving as a senior United States circuit judge of the United States Court of Appeals for the Tenth Circuit.

== Early life and education ==
Lucero was born in Antonito, Colorado. He received a Bachelor of Arts degree from Adams State College in 1961 and a Juris Doctor from the George Washington University Law School in 1964.

== Career ==
Lucero served as a law clerk for Judge William Edward Doyle of the United States District Court for the District of Colorado from 1964 to 1965. He worked in private practice of law in Alamosa, Colorado from 1966 to 1995. He was an adjunct professor of legal studies at Adams State College from 1968 to 1995. He served as the first Hispanic president of the Colorado Bar Association.

=== Federal judicial service ===
Lucero was nominated by President Bill Clinton on March 23, 1995, to the United States Court of Appeals for the Tenth Circuit, to a new seat created by 104 Stat. 5089. He was confirmed by the United States Senate on June 30, 1995, and received commission the same day. Lucero was the first Hispanic judge to sit on the Tenth Circuit. He maintained his chambers in Denver. He assumed senior status on February 1, 2021.

On June 25, 2014, Lucero wrote the majority opinion for the Kitchen v. Herbert case, which strikes down Utah's same-sex marriage ban as unconstitutional.

== See also ==
- List of Hispanic and Latino American jurists
- List of first minority male lawyers and judges in Colorado

Legal offices
New seat	Judge of the United States Court of Appeals for the Tenth Circuit; 1995–2021	Succeeded by Veronica S. Rossman
