= Mary Sternberg Thomas =

American lawyer

Mary Sternberg Thomas (February 25, 1866 – December 26, 1951) was one of Colorado's first two female lawyers.

She was born on February 25, 1866, in Mason City, Iowa. The family eventually relocated to Colorado whereupon her father set up the Boulder City Flouring Mill. She received her higher education at the University of Colorado, and by 1887, married William J. Thomas (who worked for the First Judicial District at the time of their marriage).

Thomas eventually became an autodidact of law and received her legal tutelage while working for a judicial officer. She and her husband both passed the oral examinations. While he was admitted, Thomas was denied admission into the State Bar of Colorado due to her sex. Thomas was granted to the ability to practice law only after taking the matter to the Supreme Court of Colorado. By that time, her husband was already working as a judge for Gilpin County. On September 14, 1891, she and Josephine M. Luthe became the first female lawyers in Colorado.

Thomas died on December 26, 1951.

== See also ==
- List of first women lawyers and judges in Colorado
