= Josephine M. Luthe =

American lawyer

Josephine Moody Luthe (March 4, c. 1852 – ) was an American attorney who was one of Colorado's first two female lawyers.

Luthe was born in Cedar Rapids, Iowa, around 1852. Her father, Alfred Moody, was a wagon maker from England. In 1870, at around age 16, she married Don Harris. They had a daughter, Maud, and son, Fred.

Following the death of her first husband, Luthe initially oversaw the art department of Coe College in Cedar Rapids before relocating to Denver, Colorado. She was initially going to relocate again to El Paso, Texas in order to serve as a secretary for a judicial officer, but decided to remain in Denver upon the death of one of her prospective employers.

She and Mary Sternberg Thomas became the first women admitted to practice law in Colorado on September 14, 1891. At the time of her admission, Luthe was already married to her second husband Judge Herman E. Luthe, whom she later divorced.

She practiced as a lawyer in New York City and Los Angeles, California.

== See also ==
- List of first women lawyers and judges in Colorado
