= Emma Azalia Hackley =

Singer and political activist

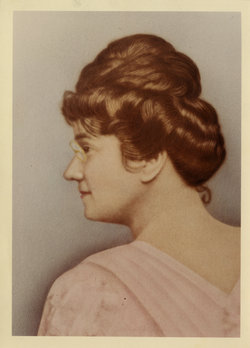
- Born: Emma Azalia Smith; June 29, 1867; Murfreesboro, Tennessee, U.S.
- Died: 1922 (aged 54–55); Detroit, Michigan, U.S.
- Spouse: Edwin Henry Hackley

Emma Azalia Hackley, also known as E. Azalia Hackley and Azalia Smith Hackley (1867–1922), was a concert soprano, newspaper editor, teacher, and political activist. An African American, she promoted racial pride through her support and promotion of music education for African Americans. She was a choir director and organized Folk Songs Festivals in African American churches and schools. Hackley studied music for years, including in Paris under opera singer Jean de Reszke. She was a music teacher who taught Roland Hayes, Marian Anderson, R. Nathaniel Dett and Isabele Taliaferro Spiller. She founded the Vocal Normal Institute in Chicago.

Hackley co-founded both the Imperial Order of Libyans and the Colored Women's League. She was a newspaper editor for the women's section of The Statesman and an author. Hackley published The Colored Girl Beautiful, a manual on becoming an accomplished and refined African American lady.

== Early life ==
Born Emma Azalia Smith on June 29, 1867, in Murfreesboro, Tennessee, she was the daughter of Henry B. and Corilla (Carrilla) Smith. Her mother, formerly Corilla Beard, lived in Detroit and her father was from Murfreesboro. They moved south after their marriage. The daughter of an escaped slave, Corilla founded a school in Murfreesboro for former enslaved people and their children. (Note: Corilla's father, William Beard, was a former slave who moved to Detroit Michigan, where he established a successful laundry business. Due to his success, he was able to ensure that his children had a good education.) She gave voice lessons at night. In 1870, the school was threatened and attacked by the Ku Klux Klan and other hostile groups during evening singing lessons. Concerned for the safety of their family, the Smiths moved to Detroit, Michigan, in 1870 or in the 1870s. Her father was a blacksmith. Corilla was a teacher and supported herself and the girls after the Smiths separated. Hackley had a younger sister named Marietta.

Hackley learned to play the piano at age three and took voice and violin lessons as a child. She was the first African American student to attend public school there. She sang and played piano at high school dances, which contributed to the Smith family's income. She completed her education at Capital High School and a normal school at the same time, graduating with honors from the Washington Normal School in 1886. She received a teaching certificate in 1887 and taught at Clinton Elementary School in Detroit from that year to 1894.

She continued her voice and violin lessons, and she also took French lessons. She sang for the Detroit Musical Society. She paid for her lessons by giving piano lessons. Hackley also gave voice recitals. Due to her very light skin color and auburn hair, many people suggested that she try to pass for white in order to further her musical career. She refused to deny her heritage and remained proud of her roots throughout her life.

== Marriage ==
She married Edwin Henry Hackley, an attorney and newspaper publisher from Denver, Colorado in 1894. After the marriage, she moved to Colorado with him. Edwin Henry Hackley, educated at the University of Michigan, was the first African American admitted to the Colorado bar. He co-founded The Statesman with Joseph D.D. Rivers.

Hackley and her husband co-founded the Imperial Order of Libyans, to combat racial prejudice and foment equality. At the turn of the twentieth century, Edwin sold his interest in The Statesman and published the Statesman-cum-Denver Star with his wife.

Her health suffered due to the high altitude and Hackley decided to move east for her health. In 1901 or 1905, Hackley separated from her husband and left Denver for Philadelphia, Pennsylvania. Hackley lived with her husband in Philadelphia in 1910 and 1912. Her mother-in-law lived with them in 1910. At the time, Edwin worked as a letter carrier and she was a singer and a music teacher. There is no record of the Hackleys having divorced. She was identified as a married woman on her death certificate of 1922; Edwin H. Hackley was identified as her husband. Identified as a widower and a playwright, Edwin died in 1940. Hackley was on his death certificate as his deceased wife.

== Career and education ==
Hackley earned her bachelor's degree from the Denver School of Music in 1900. She was the first African American graduate of the school. Trained in the bel canto vocal style, she was a concert soprano. While receiving her education, she was the assistant director of a large choir in Denver and was the choir director at her church.

She promoted racial pride through music. She defined herself as a "race musical missionary." She wanted children to be inspired, stimulated, and trained at her concerts. The Denver Post acknowledged her efforts to draw African Americans into music and said that she was "one of the best vocalists in the city."

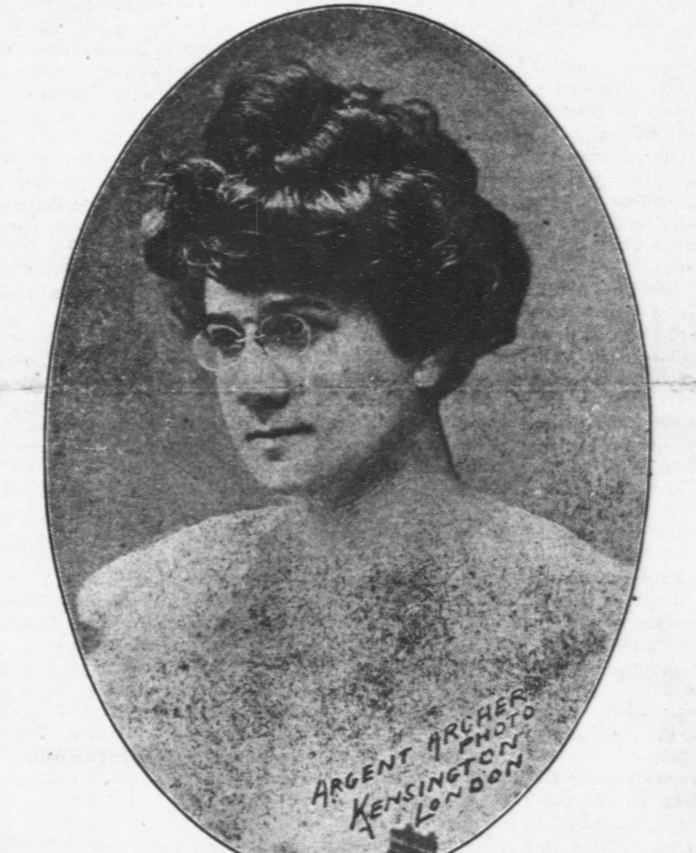
Emma Azalia Hackley, 1922

She established the Colorado branch of the Colored Women's League and was the editor of the Statesman Exponent, the woman's section of The Colorado Statesman. She wrote articles about African American literature and music, including the influence of music on children and home life. Other topics include civil government, current events, and the importance of compiling facts on blacks. She also wrote about household economies and hygiene. In one column she wrote of the Colored Women's League:

In mapping out this program we have borne in mind the great need for thought and talk on the practical as well as cultural side of woman's life. Our first work will be toward the education and improvement of our Colored women and the promotion of their interests.

Hackley held her first performance of a concert tour in Denver in 1901. In 1901, Hackley moved to Philadelphia, Pennsylvania to continue her career as a choral director. She was the director of music at the Episcopal Church of the Crucifixion. In 1904, she founded and led the 100-member People's Choir, which became known as the Hackley Choral. (Note: Black Past states that she separated and went to Philadelphia in 1905.)

She organized Folk Songs Festivals to present African American Spirituals. She introduced Black folk music to an international audience at the World Sunday School Convention in Tokyo. She held large community concerts with programs that included classical music, operatic arias, and African American spirituals performed by her and local performers. She financed the programs and provided training sessions for local performers about ten days before the concert.

In Paris, she studied under Jean de Reszke, a well-known opera singer and vocal coach in 1905 and 1906. She trained artists such as Roland Hayes, Marian Anderson, R. Nathaniel Dett and Isabele Taliaferro Spiller.

Hackley wrote newspaper and magazine articles and short books. She gave lectures at churches, colleges, and schools throughout the United States and Canada. Hackley raised funds by holding benefit concerts, which was used to provide foreign scholarships for African American classical musicians.

In 1912, she formed the Vocal Normal Institute in Chicago, Illinois, which operated until 1916. She had intended for it to be her headquarters and a central location for the school that she could return to between her tours. Instead it put a strain on her. As a result, her health began to decline.

She gathered recommendations that she had made during her lecture tours for Black woman to succeed. In 1916, Hackley published The Colored Girl Beautiful, a "how to" on becoming a refined African American lady. She defined beauty, duty, and career and leadership opportunities for black women. She was described as one of W. E. B. Du Bois's Talented Tenth by Lois Brevard, her biographer.

She was driven by a philosophy to uplift people, which she did by delivering lectures inspired by the 19th-century New Thought spiritual movement. She also enjoyed giving music lessons to large audiences. Juanita Karpf wrote the book Performing Racial Uplift: E. Azalia Hackley and African American Activism in the Post-Bellum to Pre-Harlem Era.

== Death ==
Hackley collapsed on stage while performing in San Diego in 1921 and was brought back to Detroit. She died on December 13, 1922, at the home of her sister, Mrs. Marieta Johnson, in Detroit, Michigan. She is buried at the Elmwood Cemetery in Detroit.

A special collection, the E. Azalia Hackley Collection of African Americans in the Performing Arts, was founded in her name at the Detroit Public Library in 1943.

== In popular culture ==
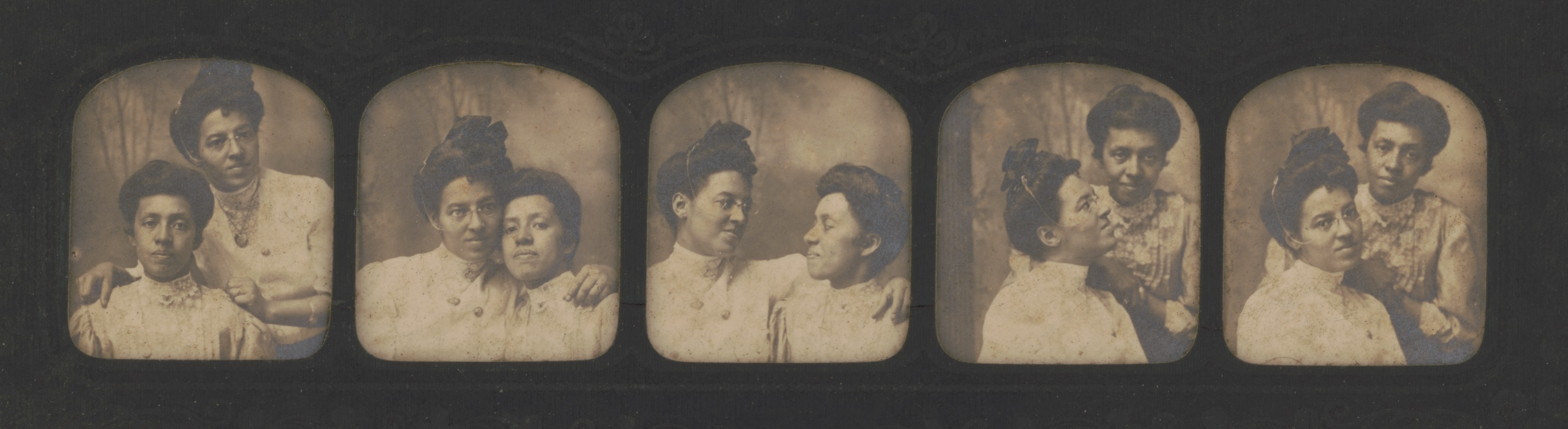
Emma Hackley (in spectacles) with Elizabeth Brooks

A portrait of Hackley, painted by Detroit artist Telitha Cumi Bowens, was included in the 1988/89 exhibit Ain't I A Woman at the Museum of African American History, Detroit. The exhibit featured a dozen prominent Black women from the state of Michigan, including the Honorable Cora M. Brown, Ethelene Jones Crockett, M.D., and teacher Fannie M. Richards.

== See also ==
- List of African American pioneers of Colorado
