= List of first women lawyers and judges in Colorado =

Coordinates: 38.9972°N 105.5478°W

This is a list of the first women lawyer(s) and judge(s) in the U.S. State of Colorado. It includes the year in which the women were admitted to practice law (in parentheses). Also included are women who achieved other distinctions such becoming the first in their state to graduate from law school or become a political figure.

== Firsts in Colorado's history ==
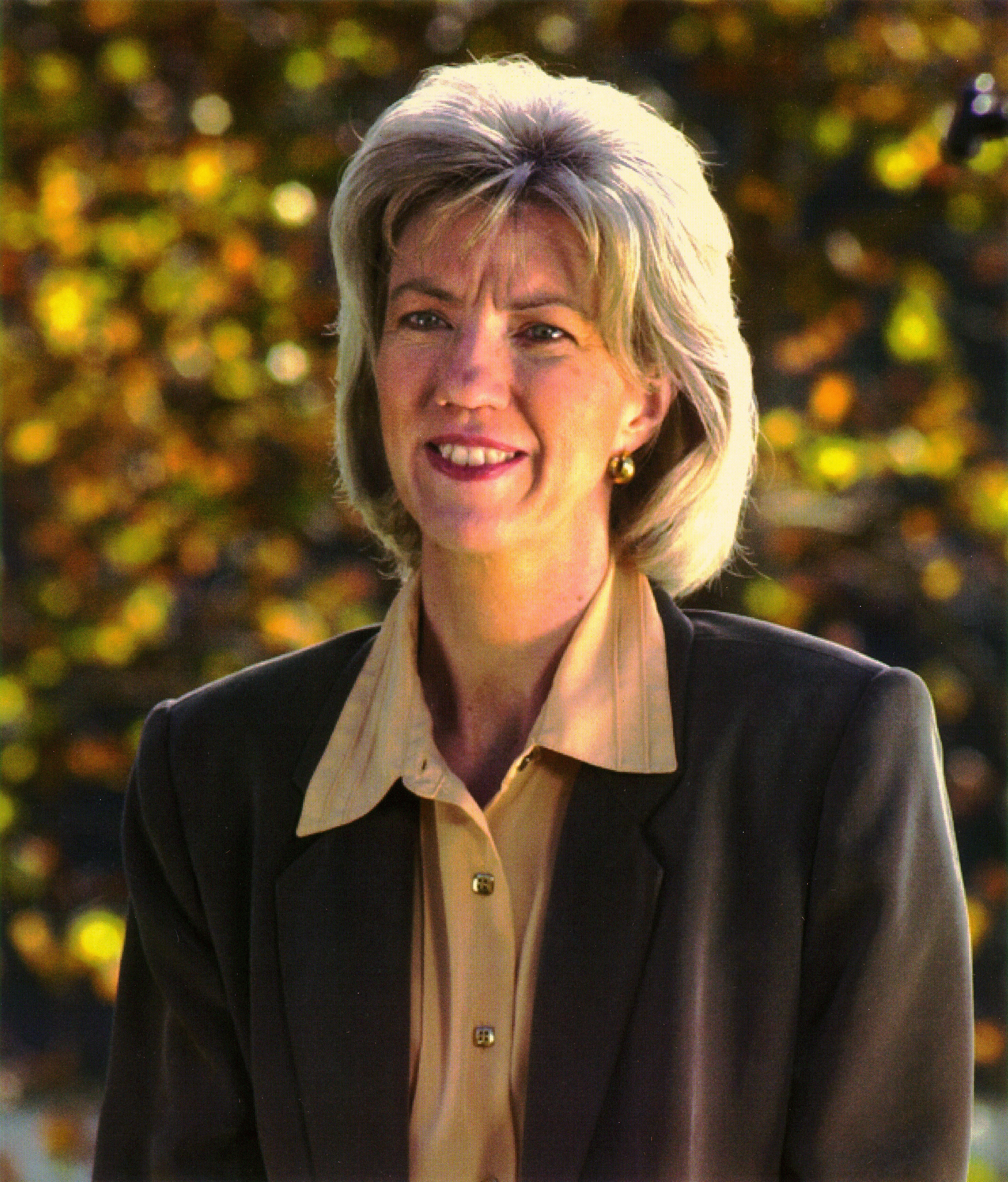
Gale Norton: First female Attorney General for Colorado (1991)

=== Law degree ===
- First females: Jeannette Dunham Bennett and Ann Hunt in 1894
- First Latino American female: Mariana Roca in 1966

=== Lawyers ===
- First females: Mary Sternberg Thomas and Josephine M. Luthe (1891)
- First female to practice before the U.S. District Court and the Colorado Court of Appeals: Mary Lathrop (1897) in 1898:
- First female (water lawyer): Vena Pointer (1926)
- First Hispanic American female: Mariana Roca (1966)
- First Asian American female (Japanese descent): Mariko Tatsumoto Layton (1977)

=== State judges ===
- First female: Ida L. Gregory in 1903
- First female (district court): Irena Ingham in 1938
- First female (Colorado Court of Appeals: Aurel M. Kelly in 1974
- First female (Chief Judge; Colorado Court of Appeals): Aurel M. Kelly in 1988
- First female (Seventeenth Judicial District Court): Dorothy Binder (1956) in 1978
- First female (Colorado Supreme Court): Jean Dubofsky (1967) in 1979
- First African American female: Claudia J. Jordan (1980) in 1994
- First Hispanic American female (Fourth Judicial District Court): Theresa M. Cisneros (1983) in 1997
- First Hispanic American female (administrative law judge): Dolores S. Atencio in 1997
- First female (Chief Justice; Colorado Supreme Court): Mary Mullarkey in 1998
- First openly lesbian female: Mary A. Celeste in 2000
- First Asian American female (Korean descent): Chelsea Malone
- First female (Fifth Judicial District): Karen Romeo in 2008
- First openly (Latino American) lesbian female (Colorado Supreme Court): Monica Márquez (1997) in 2010
- First female (Chief Judge; Eighth Judicial District): Susan Blanco in 2017
- First Asian American (female) (Colorado Appellate Court): Neeti Pawar in 2019
- First Latino American female (Colorado Supreme Court; Chief Justice): Monica Márquez (1997) in 2024
- First Iranian American (female; Colorado Supreme Court): Susan Blanco in 2026

=== Federal judges ===
- First female (U.S. District Court for the District of Colorado): Zita Leeson Weinshienk in 1979:
- First Hispanic American female (U.S. District Court for the District of Colorado): Christine Arguello (1980) in 2008
- First Asian American (female) (U.S. District Court for the District of Colorado): Regina M. Rodriguez in 2021
- First openly lesbian female (U.S. District Court for the District of Colorado): Charlotte Sweeney in 2022

=== Attorney General of Colorado ===
- First female: Gale Norton (1978) from 1991 to 1999

=== Deputy Attorney General ===
- First female: Marty Albright
- First Hispanic American (female) to serve as the Chief Deputy Attorney General: Christine Arguello (1980) in 2000

=== Assistant Attorney General ===
- First female: Clara Ruth Mozzor in 1917

=== District Attorney ===
- First female: Cathy Mullens in 1992

=== Deputy District Attorney ===
- First female: Dorothy Binder (1956) in 1958

=== State Public Defender ===
- First female: Megan Ring in 2018

=== Political Office ===
- First openly lesbian female (Colorado House of Representatives): Jennifer Veiga (1988) from 1997 to 2003

=== Colorado Bar Association ===
- First female (president): Kathryn Tamblyn in 1982

== Firsts in local history ==
- Dorothy Binder (1956): First female district court judge in Adams and Bloomfield Counties, Colorado (1978)
- Kim Shropshire: First Asian American female to serve as a Judge of the 6th Judicial District (San Juan, La Plata, and Archuleta Counties, Colorado) (2022)
- Cheryl Rowles-Stokes (1995): First African American Chief Deputy District Attorney in the 18th Judicial District Office of the District Attorney (2001–2012) and first African American female judge in Arapahoe County (2012).
- Marsha Baer Yeager: First female District Attorney and judge in Boulder County, Colorado
- Virginia Chavez: First Latino American female judge in Boulder, Boulder County, Colorado (1987)
- Lolita Buckner Innis: First African American (female) to serve as the Dean of the University of Colorado Law School (2021)
- Deni Eiring: First female to serve as a Judge of the Cheyenne County Court in the 15th Judicial District (2022)
- Karen Romeo: First female district court judge in Clear Creek, Eagle, Lake and Summit Counties, Colorado (2008)
- Mary Lathrop (1897): First female lawyer in Denver, Colorado [Denver County, Colorado]
- Mary A. Pate: First female police judge in Denver, Colorado (1910)
- Zita Weinshienk: First female judge in Denver County, Colorado
- Aleene Ortiz-White: First Latino American female appointed as a Judge of the Denver County Court (1989)
- Claudia Jordan (1980): First African American female judge appointed to the Denver County Court bench and the first in Colorado (1994).
- Karen Ashby: First African American female to serve as a district court judge in Denver, Denver County, Colorado (1997)
- Mary A. Celeste: First openly LGBT female judge appointed to the Denver County Court, Colorado (2000). She was also the first female (and openly LGBT female) to serve as the Presiding Judge of the Denver County Court (2008).
- Beth McCann: First female District Attorney for Denver, Colorado (2018) [Denver County, Colorado]
- Nicole M. Rodarte: First woman of color (who is of Latino descent) to serve as Presiding Judge of the Denver County Court (2022)
- Grace Storey Merlo: First female to serve on the Twenty-Second Judicial Branch (1987) [Dolores and Montezuma Counties, Colorado]
- Irena Ella Sweet Ingham McGarry (c. 1920s): Reputed to be the first female lawyer in El Paso County, Colorado
- Marie Shelton Holloway: First female judge in Garfield County, Colorado (1948–1964)
- Alexis King: First female to serve as the District Attorney for Gilpin and Jefferson Counties, Colorado
- Ashley Burgemeister: First female judge in Gunnison County, Colorado
- Christine A. Carney: First female judge in Larimer County, Colorado (1998)
- Mary Beth Buescher: First female lawyer in Grand Junction, Colorado [Mesa County, Colorado]
- Grace Storey Merlo: First female to serve as Public Defender for Montezuma County, Colorado (1970). She was also the first female to serve as a Judge of the 22nd Judicial District.
- Mary Johnson: First female judge in Pitkin County, Colorado (c. 1960s)
- Carrie Clyde Holly: First woman attorney in Pueblo County
- Cynthia Mitchell: First female Pueblo County Attorney, Colorado (2017)

== See also ==
- List of first women lawyers and judges in the United States
- Timeline of women lawyers in the United States
- Women in law
- List of first minority male lawyers and judges in Colorado
- List of first minority male lawyers and judges in the United States
- Bibliography of Colorado
- Geography of Colorado
- History of Colorado
- Index of Colorado-related articles
- List of Colorado-related lists
- Outline of Colorado
