= Detroit Auto Vehicle Company =

Defunct American motor vehicle manufacturer

- Industry: Automobile
- Predecessor: Detroit Novelty Machine Company
- Founded: 1904
- Defunct: 1907
- Fate: bankruptcy
- Successor: none
- Headquarters: Detroit, Michigan
- Key people: F.H. Blackman (president), Joseph Lowthian Hudson (vice-president) H.H. Lind (secretary), B. Wuryburger (treasurer), Edward T. Ross (chief engineer), John North Willys (dealer)
- Products: automobiles
- Brands: Crown; Detroit

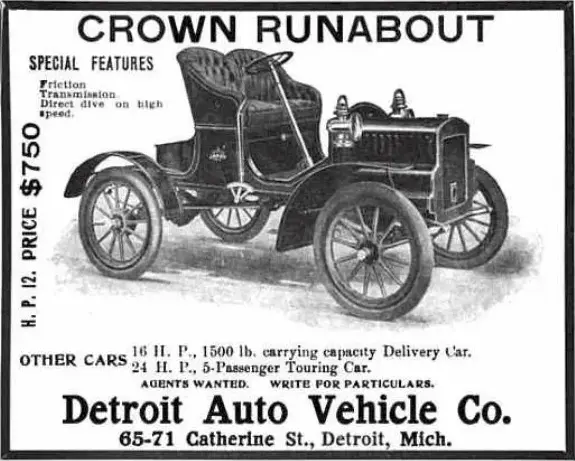
1905 Crown Runabout advertisement

Detroit Auto Vehicle Company was a short-lived early automobile manufacturer established in the summer of 1904 with a capital stock of US$150,000. Based in Detroit in the old Detroit Novelty Machine Company building, it also had a foundry in Romeo, Michigan. It ceased operation in October 1907 following bankruptcy.

== Company history ==
The company was fighting during the short time of its existence against litigation by stockholders of the predecessor company Detroit Novelty Machine Company, who were decidedly against the production of an automobile. Finally, the company went into bankruptcy in 1907. In 1908 bond holders in the bankrupt company were paid 24 percent on each $100.00 and the affairs of the company were closed.

Two of the most influential personalities in the early American automobile business were involved with the company. One was John North Willys, who soon after bought the Overland Automotive Division from the Standard Wheel Company which became the Willys-Overland Motor Company. The other gentleman was Joseph L. Hudson, a Detroit business man who earned a fortune with his department store. He backed Roy D. Chapin with the money needed to form an automobile company. Chapin named it in his honor the Hudson Motor Car Company.

== Vehicles ==
In 1905 the company had three vehicles on sale all with a two-cylinder engine. The 12 HP Crown Runabout priced at US$750, the 16 HP Crown delivery car featuring a payload of 1500 lbs and a 24HP five-passenger Touring Car.

It seems that management was not satisfied with the performance of their products. So, early in 1906 they called in Edward T. Ross from Cadillac who developed a new car. His prototype drove in August, 1906, and the automobile was ready for sale for the 1907 model year. It was a two-cylinder automobile with a wheelbase of 96 in (2,400 mm), featuring a 22/24 hp engine. It was dubbed the Model Two, but was also referred to as the "Crown-Detroit" or just "Detroit". Available were a runabout for US$1,500 and a touring for US$1,600. The company claimed its two-cylinder engine was as smooth as any four- or six-cylinder engine.

The whole production run for 1907 was sold in advance to John North Willys in Elmira, New York who became the exclusive selling agent, and referred to the 24HP car as the Detroit.
