= Veronica S. Rossman =

Russian-American judge (born 1972)

Veronica Rossman
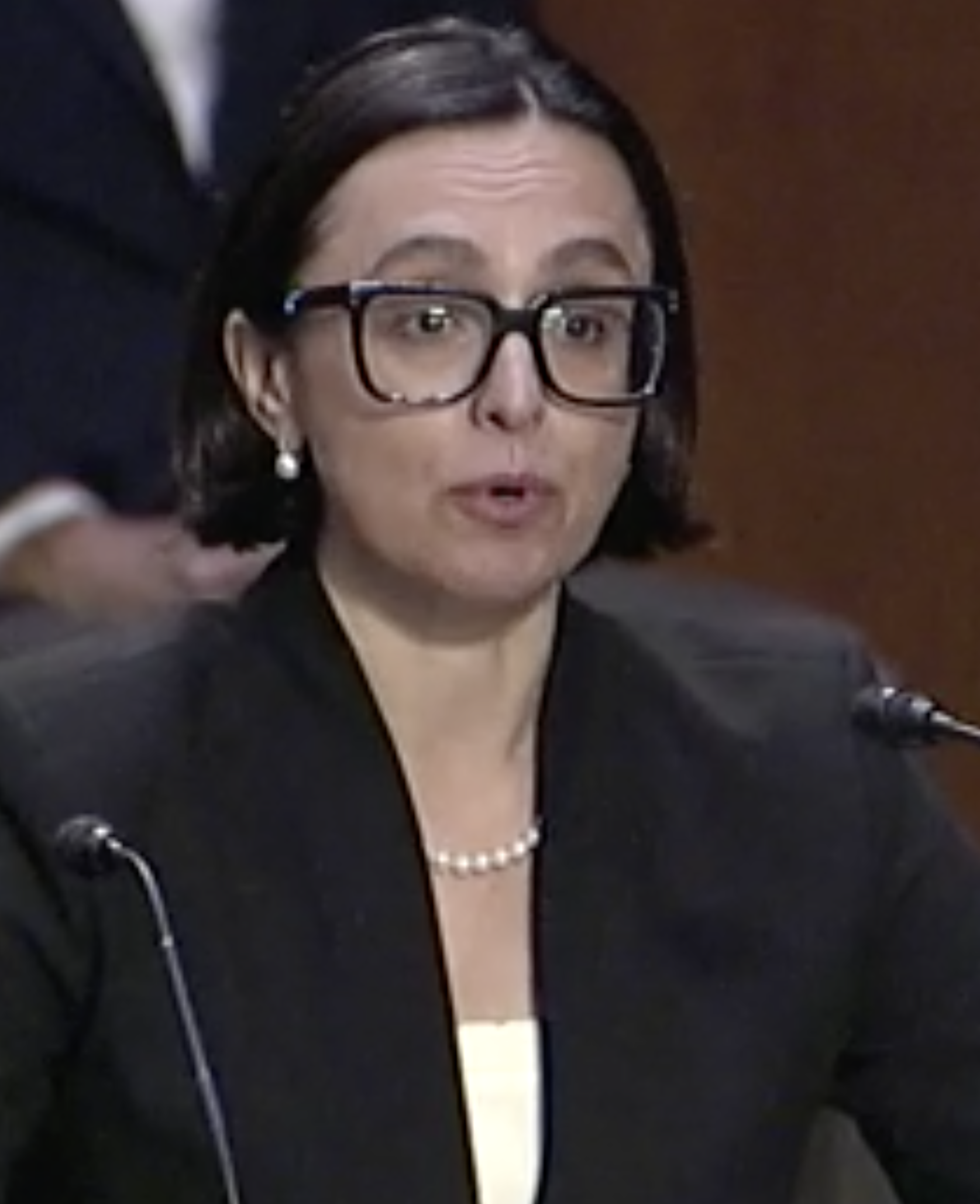

Judge of the United States Court of Appeals for the Tenth Circuit
- Incumbent
- Assumed office September 28, 2021
- Appointed by: Joe Biden
- Preceded by: Carlos F. Lucero

Personal details
- Born: Veronica Sophia Parkansky; 1972 (age 53–54) Moscow, Soviet Union (now Russia)
- Education: Columbia University (BA); University of California, Hastings (JD)

Veronica Sophia Rossman (née Parkansky, born 1972) is a Russian-born American lawyer serving as a United States circuit judge of the United States Court of Appeals for the Tenth Circuit.

== Early life and education ==
Rossman was born Veronica Sophia Parkansky in Moscow, Soviet Union. She is Jewish. When she was a child, her parents immigrated to the United States as political and religious refugees. She received her Bachelor of Arts from Columbia University in 1993 and a Juris Doctor from University of California, Hastings College of the Law in 1997.

== Career ==
Rossman began her legal career as a law clerk for Chief Justice A. William Maupin on the Nevada Supreme Court from 1997 to 1998. From 1998 to 2002, she was a litigation associate at Morrison & Foerster in their Denver office. In 2003 she was an assistant federal public defender for the Districts of Colorado and Wyoming. From 2004 to 2005, she was an attorney with the law firm of Mastbaum and Moffat in Boulder, Colorado. From 2007 to 2008, she was a staff attorney for the United States Court of Appeals for the Ninth Circuit and from 2008 to 2010 was a visiting professor at the University of Denver, Sturm College of Law. From 2015 to 2017 she served as appellate division chief within the Office of the Federal Public Defender for the Districts of Colorado and Wyoming and from 2010 to 2015 she served as an assistant federal public defender in the appellate division of the same office. From 2017 to 2021, she served as senior counsel to the office.

=== Federal judicial service ===
On May 12, 2021, President Joe Biden nominated Rossman to serve as a United States circuit judge for the United States Court of Appeals for the Tenth Circuit to the seat vacated by Judge Carlos F. Lucero, who assumed senior status on February 1, 2021. On June 9, 2021, a hearing on her nomination was held before the Senate Judiciary Committee. On July 15, 2021, her nomination was favorably reported by the committee by a 12–10 vote. On August 11, 2021, Majority Leader Chuck Schumer filed cloture on her nomination. On September 14, 2021, the United States Senate invoked cloture on her nomination by a 51–44 vote. On September 20, 2021, her nomination was confirmed by a 50–42 vote. She received her judicial commission on September 28, 2021. She was sworn into office on September 30, 2021. At the time of her appointment, she was the only judge with experience as a public defender serving on the Tenth Circuit, she was later joined by Richard Federico who was also a former federal public defender from 2015 to 2023.

== See also ==
- List of Jewish American jurists

Legal offices
Preceded by Carlos F. Lucero	Judge of the United States Court of Appeals for the Tenth Circuit; 2021–present	Incumbent
