= Romeo, Michigan =

- Village
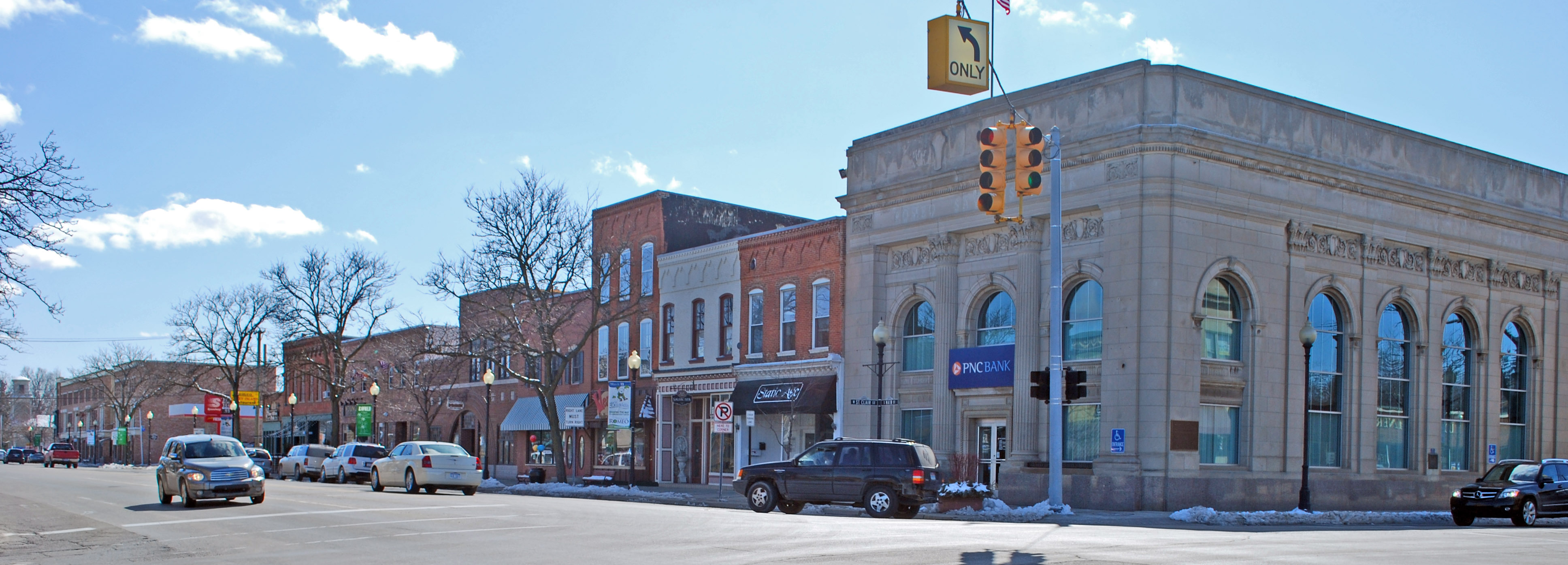
- Downtown at 32 Mile Road and Main Street
- Nicknames: Uptown, The Four Corners
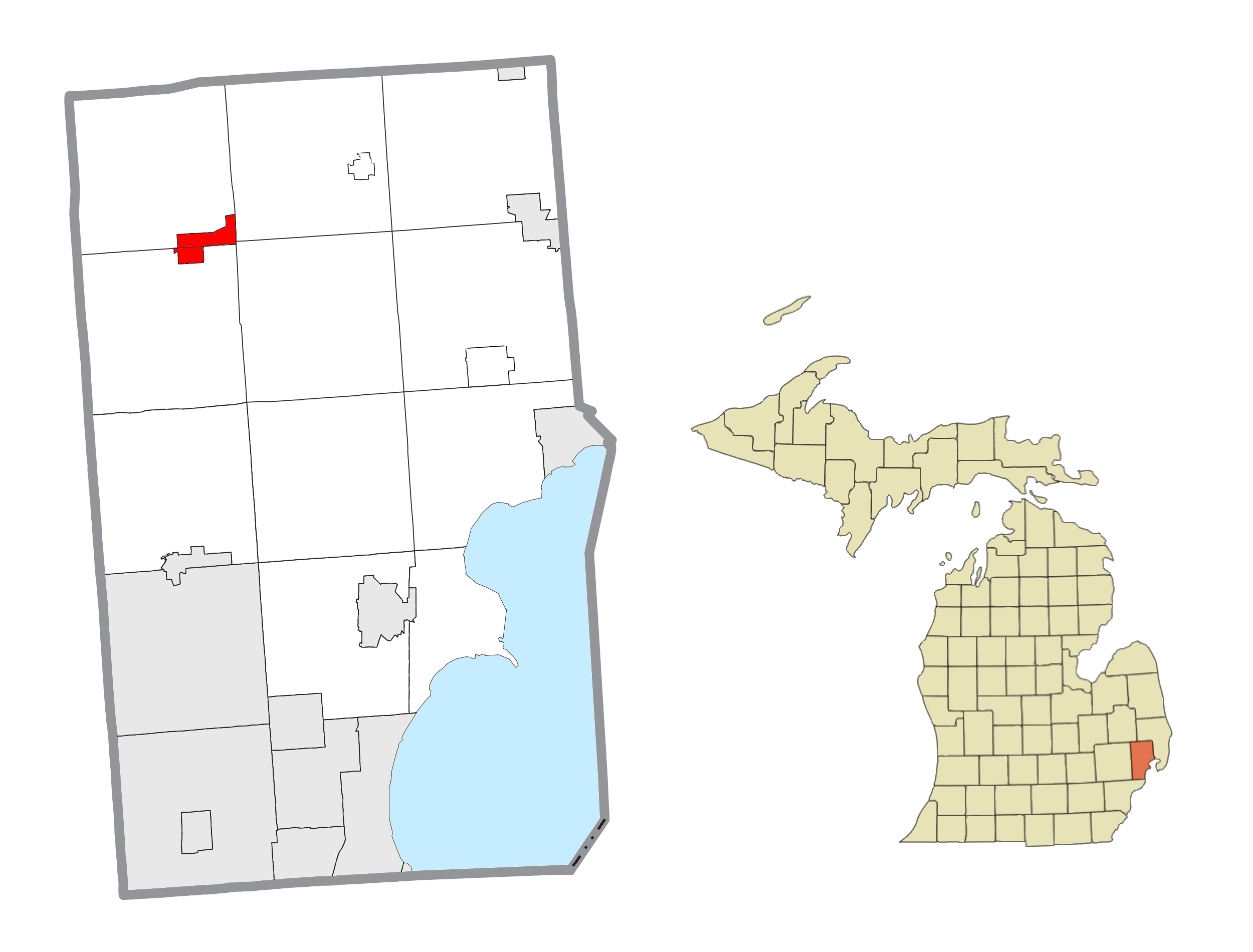
- Location within Macomb County

- Location within Michigan Location within the United States
- Coordinates: 42°48′10″N 83°00′47″W
- Country: United States
- State: Michigan
- County: Macomb
- Townships: Bruce; Washington

Area
  - Total: 2.05 sq mi (5.32 km^{2})
  - Land: 2.05 sq mi (5.31 km^{2})
  - Water: 0.0039 sq mi (0.01 km^{2})
- Elevation: 810 ft (250 m)

Population (2020)
  - Total: 3,767
  - Density: 1,836.0/sq mi (708.89/km^{2})
- Time zone: UTC-5 (Eastern (EST))
  - Summer (DST): UTC-4 (EDT)
- ZIP Code: 48065
- Area code: 586
- FIPS code: 26-69400
- GNIS feature ID: 0636145
- Website: www.villageofromeo.org

Romeo is a village in Macomb County in the U.S. state of Michigan. The population was 3,767 at the 2020 census. Romeo is located on the rural-urban fringe of the Detroit metropolitan area, and many of its residents commute to jobs closer to the city.

== History ==
A settlement here was originally occupied by the indigenous Chippewa (Ojibwe), an Algonquian-speaking people who were part of a large language family of tribes extending to the Atlantic Coast. Those tribes around the Great Lakes are thought to have migrated to this area by the 12th century.

The early European-American settlers in this area referred to the Chippewa settlement as "Indian Village". In the 1820s and 1830s more migrant European-American families began to settle in the area, building homes and establishing businesses. They renamed the community "Hoxie's Settlement", after a man who opened an inn on Main Street. In 1839, Hoxie's Settlement became incorporated and was renamed as the village of Romeo. The name was suggested by the wife of local merchant Nathaniel Taylor because it was "short, musical, classical and uncommon." Romeo celebrated its 175th anniversary on March 9, 2013.

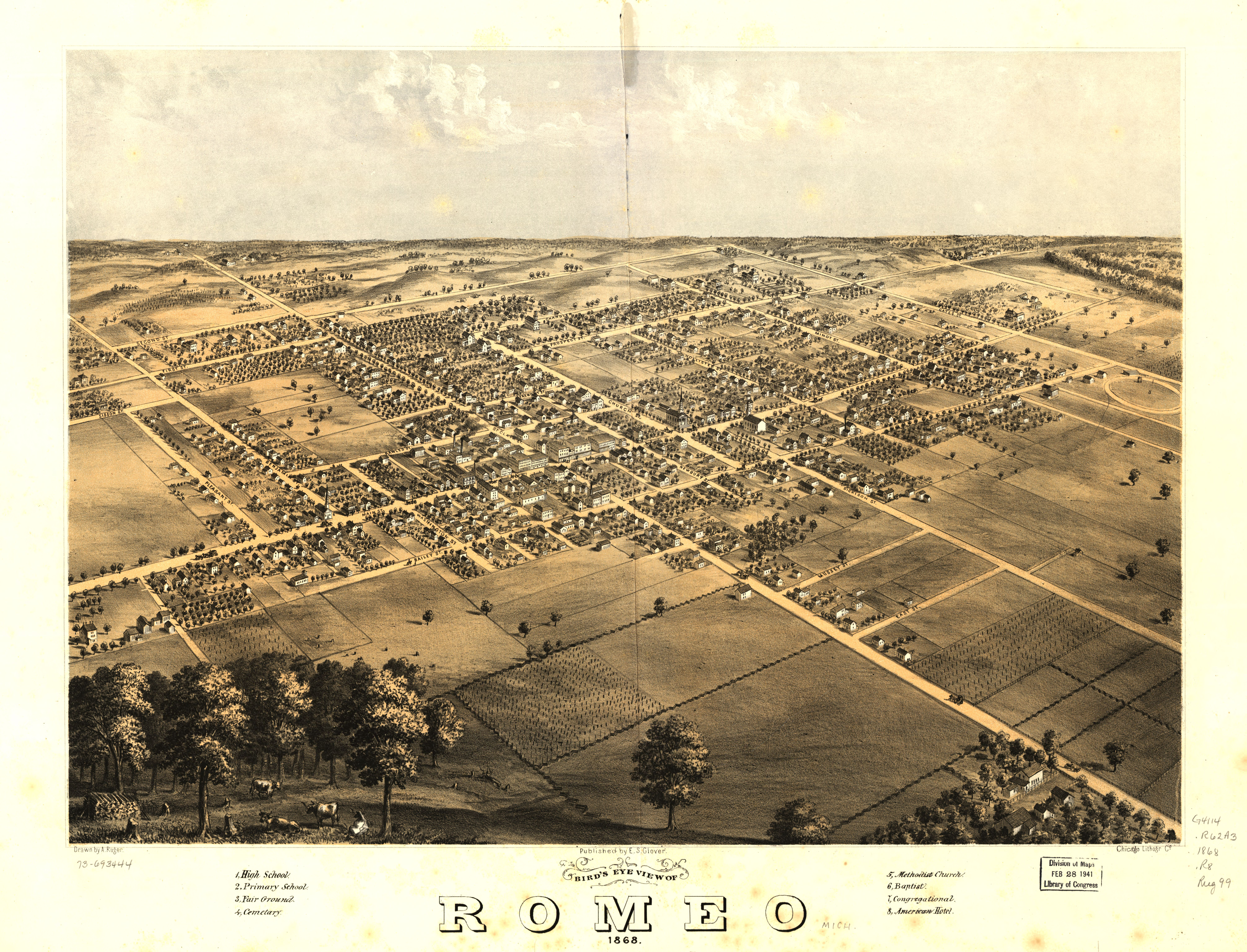
Panoramic map of Romeo with list of landmarks, 1868

Romeo once served as a trading center for the timber industry, and had many mills processing lumber from the region. Many wealthy timber families resided there. Dozens of stately Victorian mansions survive. Romeo is distinct in the area for having a fairly robust, traditional downtown, which has never suffered a major fire. Because of this, some stores and restaurants downtown have features such as original tin ceilings from the Civil War. In the early 20th century, Romeo was the site of an early business devoted to the new automobile industry: the Detroit Auto Vehicle Company operated here from 1904 until 1908.

== Geography ==
The village is in northwestern Macomb County, situated at the southeast corner of Bruce Township, with a portion extending south into Washington Township. Armada Township is adjacent to the east and Ray Township to the southeast. M-53 passes through the east side of the village, leading north 16 miles (26 km) to Imlay City and south 30 miles (48 km) to the eastern side of Detroit.

According to the United States Census Bureau, the village of Romeo has a total area of 2.05 square miles (5.31 km^{2}), of which 0.002 square miles (0.005 km^{2}), or 0.10%, are water. East Pond Creek crosses the easternmost part of the village, flowing east to the North Branch of the Clinton River, part of the Lake St. Clair watershed.

== Government ==
The government of the village of Romeo consists of elected and appointed officials. The elected officials include six council members, one president, treasurer and clerk. The appointed officials include the Chief of Police, Department of Public Works Director, and Village Administrator. Currently, the elected clerk also holds the appointed position of Village Administrator. The day-to-day operations of the village are handled by the Clerk/Administrator.

Since the turn of the 21st century, Romeo has worked to upgrade its infrastructure. It has improved the streetscape on Van Dyke Avenue, the main road through the village, and installed a new water tower. It had earlier established one of the few wastewater treatment plants in the region. While most of the metropolitan region receives water and sewage service from the City of Detroit, Romeo independently sustains its own supply of water and manages treatment of village sewage. This was especially valuable during the blackout that occurred throughout the entire northeastern United States on August 14, 2003. Romeo was one of the few areas in the Detroit metropolitan area to have clean running water. More recent infrastructure improvements include a complete renovation of the village water system, and replacement of all the sidewalks throughout the village.

== Schools ==
Romeo Community Schools has one high school (including a ninth grade academy), one middle school and five elementary schools. Most of the schools are located outside the village limits.

== Demographics ==
Historical population
Census	Pop.	Note	%±
1850	330		—
1880	1,629		—
1890	1,637		0.5%
1900	1,580		−3.5%
1910	1,787		13.1%
1920	2,102		17.6%
1930	2,283		8.6%
1940	2,627		15.1%
1950	2,985		13.6%
1960	3,327		11.5%
1970	4,012		20.6%
1980	3,509		−12.5%
1990	3,520		0.3%
2000	3,721		5.7%
2010	3,596		−3.4%
2020	3,767		4.8%
U.S. Decennial Census

=== 2020 census ===
As of the 2020 census, Romeo had a population of 3,767. The median age was 41.7 years. 20.0% of residents were under the age of 18 and 19.7% of residents were 65 years of age or older. For every 100 females there were 85.3 males, and for every 100 females age 18 and over there were 83.1 males age 18 and over.

100.0% of residents lived in urban areas, while 0.0% lived in rural areas.

There were 1,578 households in Romeo, of which 29.1% had children under the age of 18 living in them. Of all households, 41.8% were married-couple households, 17.4% were households with a male householder and no spouse or partner present, and 33.8% were households with a female householder and no spouse or partner present. About 32.2% of all households were made up of individuals and 14.2% had someone living alone who was 65 years of age or older.

There were 1,661 housing units, of which 5.0% were vacant. The homeowner vacancy rate was 0.8% and the rental vacancy rate was 4.4%.

Racial composition as of the 2020 census
Race	Number	Percent
White	3,197	84.9%
Black or African American	136	3.6%
American Indian and Alaska Native	2	0.1%
Asian	12	0.3%
Native Hawaiian and Other Pacific Islander	0	0.0%
Some other race	152	4.0%
Two or more races	268	7.1%
Hispanic or Latino (of any race)	269	7.1%

=== 2010 census ===
As of the census of 2010, there were 3,596 people, 1,501 households, and 979 families residing in the village. The population density was 1,780.2 inhabitants per square mile (687.3/km^{2}). There were 1,659 housing units at an average density of 821.3 per square mile (317.1/km^{2}). The racial makeup of the village was 91.9% White, 3.8% African American, 0.2% Native American, 0.5% Asian, 1.1% from other races, and 2.6% from two or more races. Hispanic or Latino people of any race were 5.7% of the population.

There were 1,501 households, of which 32.2% had children under the age of 18 living with them, 46.2% were married couples living together, 14.9% had a female householder with no husband present, 4.1% had a male householder with no wife present, and 34.8% were non-families. 30.8% of all households were made up of individuals, and 13.6% had someone living alone who was 65 years of age or older. The average household size was 2.36 and the average family size was 2.96.

The median age in the village was 40.9 years. 23.5% of residents were under the age of 18; 7.7% were between the ages of 18 and 24; 24.1% were from 25 to 44; 29.4% were from 45 to 64; and 15.3% were 65 years of age or older. The gender makeup of the village was 46.4% male and 53.6% female.

=== 2000 census ===
As of the census of 2000, there were 3,721 people, 1,528 households, and 993 families residing in the village. The population density was 1,842.8 inhabitants per square mile (711.5/km^{2}). There were 1,605 housing units at an average density of 794.9 per square mile (306.9/km^{2}). The racial makeup of the village was 92.66% White, 4.35% African American, 0.16% Native American, 0.40% Asian, 0.11% Pacific Islander, 0.67% from other races, and 1.64% from two or more races. Hispanic or Latino people of any race were 2.74% of the population.

There were 1,528 households, out of which 33.3% had children under the age of 18 living with them, 48.2% were married couples living together, 13.5% had a female householder with no husband present, and 35.0% were non-families. 31.3% of all households were made up of individuals, and 13.2% had someone living alone who was 65 years of age or older. The average household size was 2.40 and the average family size was 3.04.

In the village, the population was spread out, with 26.1% under the age of 18, 8.2% from 18 to 24, 30.1% from 25 to 44, 21.4% from 45 to 64, and 14.2% who were 65 years of age or older. The median age was 36 years. For every 100 females, there were 87.2 males. For every 100 females age 18 and over, there were 82.5 males.

The median income for a household in the village was $48,015, and the median income for a family was $60,179. Males had a median income of $51,875 versus $27,696 for females. The per capita income for the village was $22,588. About 3.2% of families and 3.9% of the population were below the poverty line, including 6.5% of those under age 18 and 3.9% of those age 65 or over.

== Events ==
Romeo hosts the Michigan Peach Festival annually on Labor Day weekend. Started in 1931 to promote the local orchards, in the early 21st century, festival events include a 5K/10K run, a car show, three parades, craft show, Kidsfest, and carnival rides. A yearly Peach Queen is chosen to preside over events and represent Romeo. The Michigan Peach Festival is sponsored by the Romeo Lions Club fraternal organization.

Tillson Street in Romeo is known for its elaborate Halloween decorations.

On February 14 of each year, the village of Romeo offers a special dual postmark with the community of Juliette, Georgia. This tradition began in 1994, as a nod to the William Shakespeare play, Romeo and Juliet.

== Notable people ==
- Frank Bowerman, Major League Baseball catcher
- Harold Courlander, writer, folklorist, and anthropologist
- Edwin Henry Hackley, lawyer
- Jill Ritchie, actress
- Kid Rock, rapper
- Tom Sharpe, drummer for Mannheim Steamroller and Dennis DeYoung
- Ben Stephens, Major League Baseball pitcher
- Henry Stephens, lumber baron
