= List of first minority male lawyers and judges in Colorado =

Coordinates: 38.9972°N 105.5478°W

This is a list of the first minority male lawyer(s) and judge(s) in the U.S. State of Colorado. It includes the year in which the men were admitted to practice law (in parentheses). Also included are other distinctions such as the first minority men in their state to graduate from law school or become a political figure.

== Firsts in Colorado's history ==
=== Lawyers ===
- First African American: Edwin Henry Hackley (1883)
- One of the first Latino male lawyers in Colorado: Roger Cisneros (1957)
- First undocumented male: Edgar Barraza (2016)

=== State judges ===
- First Jewish American male: Charles Rosenbaum
- First African American male: James C. Flanigan in 1957
- First Hispanic American male (district court): Don Pacheco in 1971
- First Hispanic American male (Supreme Court of Colorado): Luis Rovira in 1979
- First blind male: Dana Wakefield in 1980
- First Latino American male (Colorado Court of Appeals): Jose Deciderio Lorenzo (D.L.) Marquez (1970) in 1988
- First African American male (18th Judicial District): Robert Russell:
- First Hispanic American male (Chief Justice; Supreme Court of Colorado): Luis Rovira in 1990
- First African American male (Colorado Supreme Court): Gregory Kellam Scott in 1992:
- First openly gay male (district court): David Brett Woods in 2009
- First Latino American male (Chief Judge; Colorado Court of Appeals): Gilbert M. Román in 2021
- First South Asian male (superior court judge): Samir Patel in 2024

=== Federal judges ===
- First African American male (U.S. District Court for the District of Colorado): Wiley Young Daniel (1971) in 1995
- First Hispanic American male (U.S. Court of Appeals for the Tenth Circuit): Carlos F. Lucero (1964) in 1995
- First African American male (Magistrate Judge; United States District Court for the District of Colorado): Kato Crews in 2018

=== Attorney General of Colorado ===
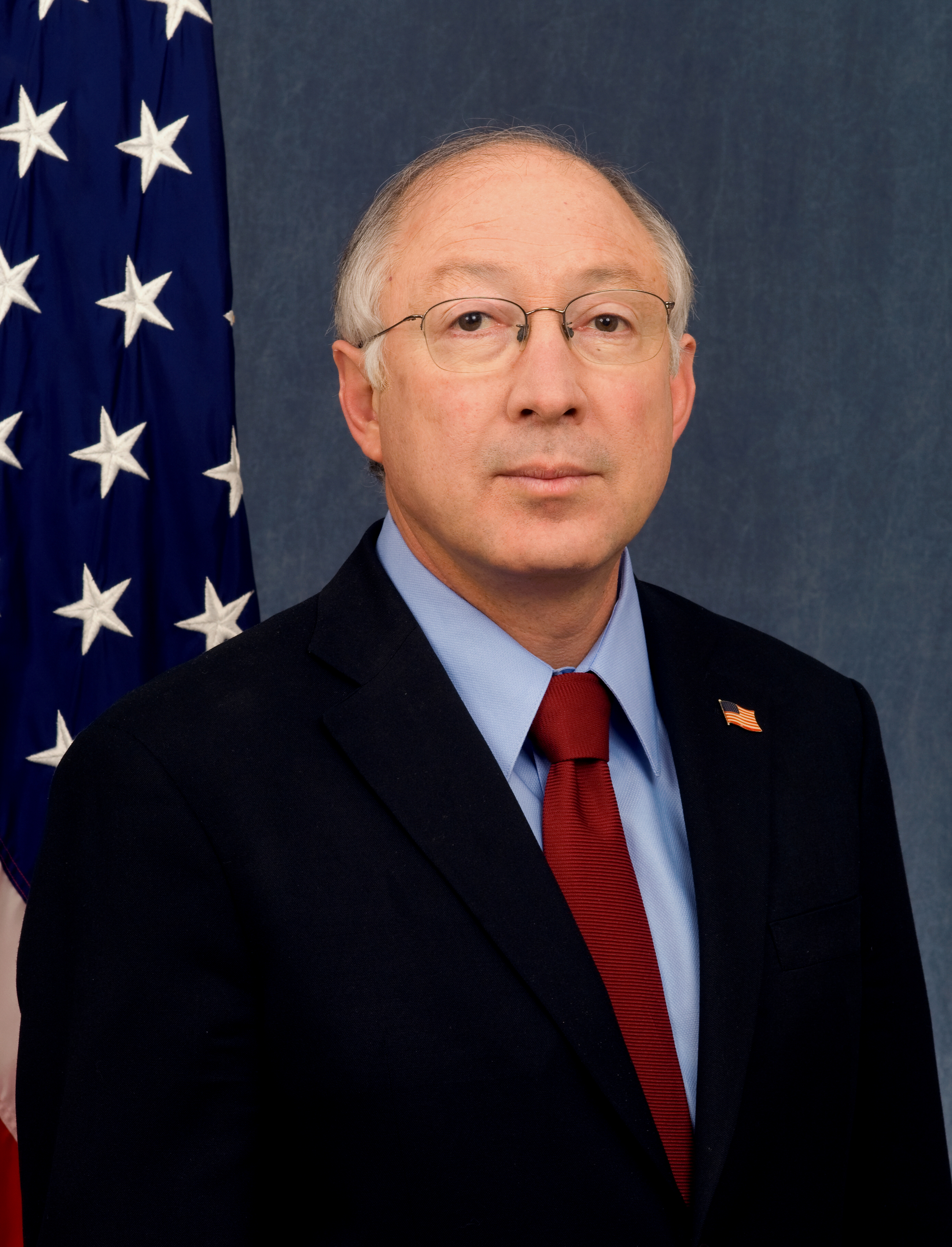
Ken Salazar was the first Hispanic American male Attorney General for Colorado (1999)

- First Hispanic American male: Ken Salazar (1981) from 1999 to 2005
- First Jewish American male: Phil Weiser in 2019

=== United States Attorney ===
- First Hispanic American male (U.S. Attorney for the District of Colorado): Charles S. Vigil in 1951

=== District Attorney ===
- First African American male: Norman S. Early Jr. in 1983

=== Colorado Bar Association ===
- First African American male admitted: Edwin Henry Hackley (1883)
- First Hispanic American male (president): Carlos F. Lucero (1964) from 1977 to 1978
- First African American male (president): Wiley Young Daniel (1971) in 1991

== Firsts in local history ==
- Alonzo Payne: First Latino American male to serve as the 12th Judicial District Attorney (2021) [Alamosa, Conejos, Costilla, Saguache, Mineral and Rio Grande Counties, Colorado]
- Madoche Jean: First African American male judge in the 17th Judicial District [Adams County, Colorado; 2020]
- Martin Gonzales: First Hispanic American male judge in Alamosa County, Colorado (2000)
- James C. Flanigan: First African American male to serve as a Deputy District Attorney and municipal court judge in Denver, Colorado
- Norman S. Early Jr.: First African American male to serve as the District Attorney for Denver, Colorado (1983) [Denver County, Colorado]
- Joe Ulibarri: First Hispanic American male to serve as a municipal court judge in Pueblo County, Colorado (c. 1977). In 1971, he might have been the first Hispanic American male lawyer to practice in the county.
- Alex Martinez: First Hispanic American male to serve as a full-time county court judge in Pueblo County, Colorado (1983)
- Dennis Maes: First Hispanic American male to serve as a district court judge in Pueblo County, Colorado (1988). He was also the first Hispanic male to serve as President of the Pueblo County Bar Association (1986).
- Gilbert Gutierrez: First Latino American male to serve on the Weld County District Court, Colorado (1997)

== See also ==
- List of first women lawyers and judges in Colorado
- List of first women lawyers and judges in the United States
- List of first minority male lawyers and judges in the United States
- Bibliography of Colorado
- Geography of Colorado
- History of Colorado
- Index of Colorado-related articles
- List of Colorado-related lists
- Outline of Colorado
