= Armada Township, Michigan =

- Civil township
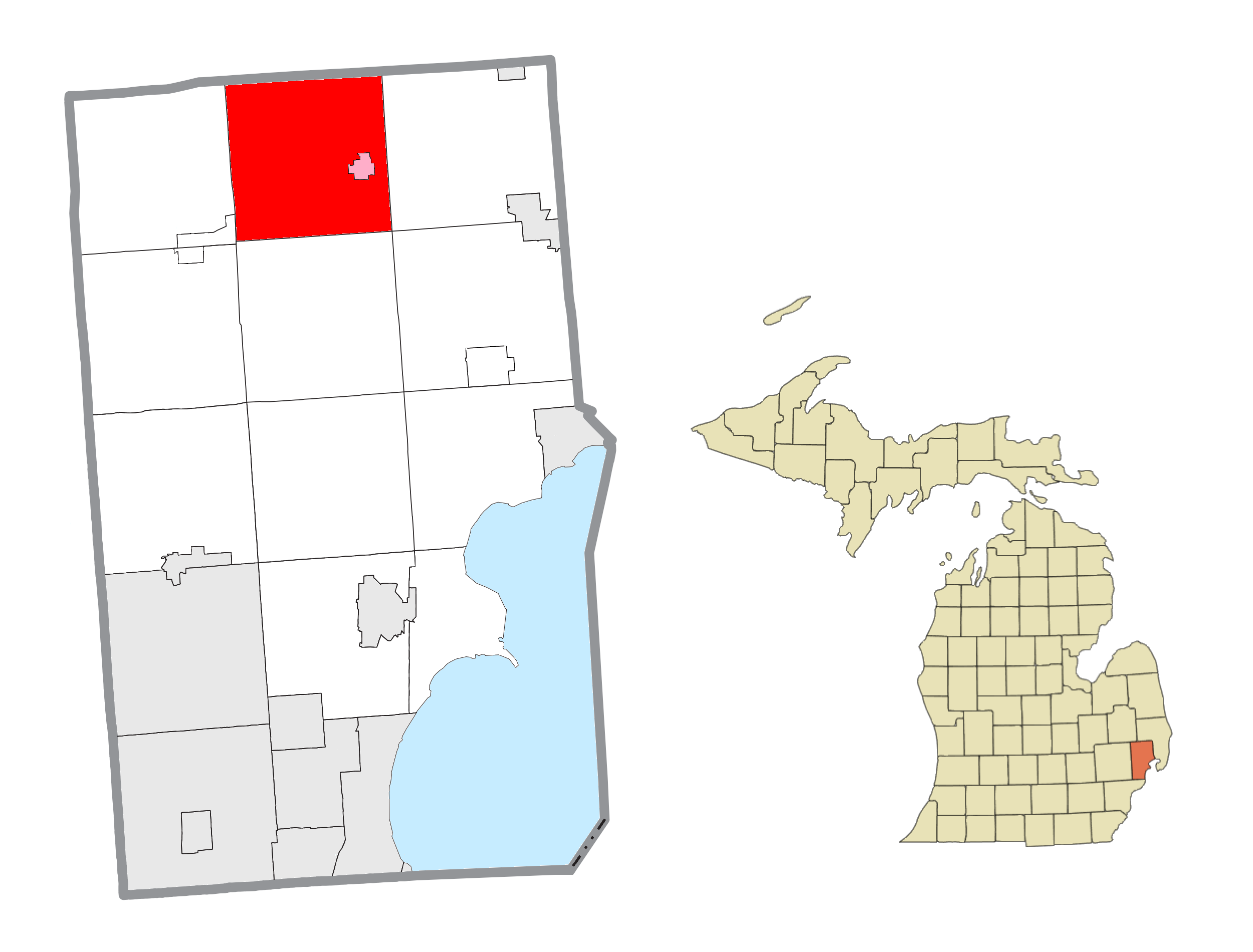
- Location within Macomb County (red) and the administered village of Armada (pink)

- Location within Michigan Location within the United States
- Coordinates: 42°50′33″N 82°54′53″W
- Country: United States
- State: Michigan
- County: Macomb
- Organized: 1837

Area
  - Total: 36.56 sq mi (94.7 km^{2})
  - Land: 36.50 sq mi (94.5 km^{2})
  - Water: 0.06 sq mi (0.16 km^{2})
- Elevation: 774 ft (236 m)

Population (2020)
  - Total: 5,318
  - Density: 145.7/sq mi (56.3/km^{2})
- Time zone: UTC-5 (Eastern (EST))
  - Summer (DST): UTC-4 (EDT)
- ZIP Code: 48005
- Area code: 586
- FIPS code: 26-03540
- GNIS feature ID: 1625850
- Website: armadatwp.gov

Armada Township is a civil township of Macomb County in the U.S. state of Michigan. As of the 2020 census, the township population was 5,318.

The village of Armada is located within the township. Armada Township was organized in 1832.

== Geography ==
According to the United States Census Bureau, the township has a total area of 36.6 square miles (95 km^{2}), of which 0.06 square miles (0.16 km^{2}), or 0.17%, are water.

== Demographics ==
As of the census of 2000, there were 5,246 people, 1,715 households, and 1,413 families residing in the township. The population density was 143.7 inhabitants per square mile (55.5/km^{2}). There were 1,761 housing units at an average density of 48.3 per square mile (18.6/km^{2}). The racial makeup of the township was 98.06% White, 0.11% African American, 0.29% Native American, 0.11% Asian, 0.02% Pacific Islander, 0.38% from other races, and 1.03% from two or more races. Hispanic or Latino of any race were 1.52% of the population.

There were 1,715 households, out of which 42.5% had children under the age of 18 living with them, 74.0% were married couples living together, 5.5% had a female householder with no husband present, and 17.6% were non-families. 14.9% of all households were made up of individuals, and 6.2% had someone living alone who was 65 years of age or older. The average household size was 3.01 and the average family size was 3.36.

In the township the population was spread out, with 29.0% under the age of 18, 7.8% from 18 to 24, 29.9% from 25 to 44, 24.4% from 45 to 64, and 8.8% who were 65 years of age or older. The median age was 36 years. For every 100 females, there were 101.5 males. For every 100 females age 18 and over, there were 100.2 males.

The median income for a household in the township was $68,421, and the median income for a family was $77,019. Males had a median income of $52,191 versus $32,146 for females. The per capita income for the township was $24,766. About 1.8% of families and 2.0% of the population were below the poverty line, including 1.5% of those under age 18 and 3.1% of those age 65 or over.
