= Samuel Eddy Cary =

American lawyer (1886–1961)

Samuel Eddy Cary (July 9, 1886 - April 13, 1961) was a lawyer in Kansas and Colorado.

He was born in Providence, Kentucky. In 1910 graduated from Washburn Law School in Kansas, the first African American to receive a degree from the law school. He moved to Colorado with his family in 1919.

Cary was disbarred in 1926 over accusations of financial improprieties, despite serving many who could not afford to pay him. He was restored to the bar in 1935. He retired in 1945.

The Sam Cary Bar Association is named for him. It was established by seven attorneys with African heritage in 1971. In 2011, Washburn Law School recognized Cary with a Lifetime Achievement Award. There is also a Sam Cary Scholarship Fund.

== See also ==
- List of first minority male lawyers and judges in Colorado
