= National Register of Historic Places listings in Huron County, Michigan =

The following is a list of Registered Historic Places in Huron County, Michigan.
This National Park Service list is complete through NPS recent listings posted May 15, 2026.

== Current listings ==
	Name on the Register	Image	Date listed	Location	City or town	Description
1	Bay Port Historic Commercial Fishing District	Bay Port Historic Commercial Fishing District	September 22, 1977 (#77000714)	Saginaw Bay end of Lakeside Dr. and First St. 43°51′14″N 83°22′25″W	Bay Port	
2	First Methodist Episcopal Church	First Methodist Episcopal Church	November 20, 1987 (#87001963)	4451 Second St. 43°56′22″N 82°42′59″W	Port Hope	
3	James and Jane Grice House	James and Jane Grice House	November 12, 1982 (#82000534)	865 N. Huron Ave. 43°51′20″N 82°39′12″W	Harbor Beach	
4	Grindstone City Historic District	Grindstone City Historic District	September 3, 1971 (#71000393)	On M-25; 44°03′16″N 82°53′53″W	Grindstone City	
5	Harbor Beach Lighthouse	Harbor Beach Lighthouse	August 4, 1983 (#83000850)	Breakwater Entrance; 43°50′44″N 82°37′51″W	Harbor Beach	
6	Herman House	Herman House	November 20, 1987 (#87001974)	4405 Main St. 43°56′27″N 82°42′46″W	Port Hope	
7	Huron City Historic District	Huron City Historic District	April 28, 1995 (#95000446)	Pioneer Dr., Huron and Port Austin Townships; 44°01′52″N 82°49′57″W	Huron City	
8	Indian Mission	Indian Mission	September 22, 1972 (#72000620)	590 E. Bay St. 43°43′33″N 83°26′32″W	Sebewaing	
9	Charles G. Learned House	Charles G. Learned House	May 31, 1984 (#84001400)	8544 Lake St. 44°02′32″N 82°59′38″W	Port Austin	
10	Isaac Leuty House	Isaac Leuty House	November 20, 1987 (#87001975)	7955 School St. 43°56′26″N 82°42′54″W	Port Hope	
11	Masonic Temple	Masonic Temple	November 20, 1987 (#87001962)	4425 Main St. 43°56′28″N 82°42′48″W	Port Hope	
12	Melligan Store-Agriculture Hall	Melligan Store-Agriculture Hall	January 4, 1988 (#87001965)	4432 Main St. 43°56′30″N 82°42′46″W	Port Hope	
13	Frank Murphy Birthplace	Frank Murphy Birthplace	September 22, 1971 (#71000394)	142 S. Huron St. 43°50′33″N 82°39′05″W	Harbor Beach	
14	Navigation Structures at Harbor Beach Harbor	Navigation Structures at Harbor Beach Harbor	September 11, 1997 (#97000972)	N. Lakeshore Dr. 43°50′54″N 82°38′15″W	Harbor Beach	
15	Ogilvie Building	Ogilvie Building	November 20, 1987 (#87001973)	4443 Main St. 43°56′29″N 82°42′49″W	Port Hope	
16	Pointe Aux Barques Lighthouse	Pointe Aux Barques Lighthouse	March 20, 1973 (#73000949)	East of Huron City on Light House Rd. 44°01′25″N 82°45′20″W	Huron City	
17	Port Austin Reef Light	Port Austin Reef Light	September 15, 2011 (#11000666)	Port Austin Reef, 2.5 miles north of Port Austin (Port aux Barques Township); 44°04′55″N 82°58′55″W	Port Austin vicinity	Light Stations of the United States MPS
18	Albert E. Sleeper House	Albert E. Sleeper House	February 1, 1972 (#72000619)	228 W. Huron St. (M-53); 43°48′06″N 83°00′16″W	Bad Axe	
19	Smith-Culhane House	Smith-Culhane House	September 24, 2001 (#01001015)	8569 Lake St. 44°02′35″N 82°59′41″W	Port Austin	
20	St. John's Lutheran Church	St. John's Lutheran Church	November 20, 1987 (#87001964)	4527 Second St. 43°56′26″N 82°43′07″W	Port Hope	
21	Stafford House	Stafford House	January 25, 1973 (#73000950)	4467 Main St. 43°56′28″N 82°42′53″W	Port Hope	
22	Frederick H. and Elizabeth Stafford House	Frederick H. and Elizabeth Stafford House	November 20, 1987 (#87001976)	4489 Main St. 43°56′30″N 82°42′53″W	Port Hope	
23	W. R. Stafford Flour Mill and Elevator	W. R. Stafford Flour Mill and Elevator	November 20, 1987 (#87001961)	4310 Huron St. 43°56′31″N 82°42′29″W	Port Hope	
24	W. R. Stafford Planing Mill Site	W. R. Stafford Planing Mill Site	November 20, 1987 (#87001960)	Huron St. 43°56′29″N 82°42′27″W	Port Hope	
25	W. R. Stafford Saw Mill Site	W. R. Stafford Saw Mill Site	November 20, 1987 (#87001959)	4451 Huron St. (at Stafford County Park); 43°56′37″N 82°42′32″W	Port Hope	
26	W. R. Stafford Worker's House	W. R. Stafford Worker's House	November 20, 1987 (#87001978)	8022 Cedar St. 43°56′22″N 82°42′40″W	Port Hope	
27	Winsor and Snover Bank Building	Winsor and Snover Bank Building	March 19, 1987 (#87000482)	8648 Lake St. 44°02′40″N 82°59′38″W	Port Austin	

== See also ==
- List of Michigan State Historic Sites in Huron County, Michigan
- List of National Historic Landmarks in Michigan
- National Register of Historic Places listings in Michigan
- Listings in neighboring counties: Sanilac, Tuscola
