= List of Michigan State Historic Sites in Huron County =

Location of Huron County in Michigan

The following is a list of Michigan State Historic Sites in Huron County, Michigan. Sites marked with a dagger (†) are also listed on the National Register of Historic Places in Huron County, Michigan.

== Current listings ==
Name	Image	Location	City	Listing date
Wallace Allen House		303 N Port Crescent	Bad Axe	November 15, 1990
Bay Port Commercial Fishing Historic District†		Off M-25 (Marker at 1008 1st Street)	Bay Port	February 21, 1975
Caseville Methodist Episcopal Church		6490 Main Street	Caseville	March 15, 1990
Citizens Bank Block		2236 Main Street	Ubly	March 18, 1998
Great Fire of 1881 Informational Designation		Roadside Park on M-25, 1/2 mile South of Junction M-25 and M-142	Bay Port	January 19, 1957
James and Jane Grice House†		865 North Huron Avenue	Harbor Beach	November 3, 1976
Grindstone City Historic District†		On M-25, five miles east of Port Austin	Grindstone City	September 25, 1956
Huron City Historic District†		Pioneer Drive	Port Austin	August 6, 1976
Huron House		113 South Huron Street	Harbor Beach	April 18, 1983
Indian Mission†		590 East Bay Street	Sebewaing vicinity	July 19, 1962
Jewish Colony (Demolished)		16 N, 13 E, 5 miles NE of Bad Axe	Verona Township	February 11, 1972
Charles G. Learned House†		8544 Lake Street	Port Austin	June 10, 1980
Frank Murphy Birthplace†		142 South Huron Street	Harbor Beach	February 17, 1967
Owendale Informational Designation		Village Park	Owendale	April 4, 1975
Parisville Poles Informational Designation		4190 Parisville Road	Parisville vicinity	February 7, 1977
Pigeon Depot		59 South Main	Pigeon	August 21, 1987
Pointe Aux Barques Lighthouse†		Pointe Aux Barques, east of Huron City on Light House Road	Huron City vicinity	February 11, 1972
Port Crescent Ghost Town		Port Crescent State Park, M-25 at Port Crescent Road	Port Austin vicinity	January 18, 1963
Saginaw, Tuscola and Huron Railroad Elkton Depot		76 North Main Street	Elkton	August 22, 1985
Saint Mary of Czestochowa Roman Catholic Church		Moeller Road east of Hellems Road	Dwight Township	November 2, 1980
Saint Michael's Church		Independence Street	Port Austin	December 10, 1971
Sebewaing Township Hall		92 South Center	Sebewaing	November 1, 1988
Albert E. Sleeper House†		302 West Huron Avenue	Bad Axe	April 23, 1971
W. R. Stafford House†		4467 Main Street	Port Hope	December 10, 1971
W. R. Stafford Saw Mill Site†		Huron Street; Stafford Park, near M-25	Port Hope	July 17, 1961
Stagecoach Travel in Michigan Informational Designation		Cedar Street	Bay Port	August 12, 1977
White Rock School		Highway M-25	White Rock vicinity	April 14, 1972
White Rock Treaty of 1807 Boundary Marker		1/4 mile off shore in Lake Huron, visible from the intersection of M-25 and Atwater Road		February 18, 1956
Winsor and Snover Bank Building†		8648 Lake Street	Port Austin	January 27, 1983
Woldt Brothers General Store		9503 Bach Road	Sebewaing	February 25, 1988

== See also ==
- National Register of Historic Places listings in Huron County, Michigan

== Sources ==
- Historic Sites Online – Huron County. Michigan State Housing Developmental Authority. Accessed January 23, 2011.
