= Stafford House (disambiguation) =

Stafford House is a mansion in the St. James's district in the West End of London.

Stafford House may also refer to:

in Canada

- Joseph Stafford House, listed on the Canadian Register of Historic Places

in the United Kingdom

- Stafford House International School, a language school in Canterbury, England
- Stafford House International School, a language school in London, England
- Stafford House International School, a language school in Cambridge, England
- Stafford House Study Holidays, English language summer camps run across the UK, USA and Malaysia
- Stafford House, Wrexham, building in Wrexham, Wales

in the United States

- Francis M. Stafford House, Paintsville, Kentucky
- Frederick H. and Elizabeth Stafford House, Port Hope, Michigan
- William R. Stafford House, Port Hope, Michigan
- Captain John H. Stafford House, Bronx, New York, a New York City Landmark
- John Stafford House, Columbus, Texas, formerly listed on the National Register of Historic Places
