= Agriculture Hall =

Agriculture Hall may refer to:

- Agriculture Hall (Tippecanoe County, Indiana), listed on the Indiana Register of Historic Sites and Structures
- Agriculture Hall (Ames, Iowa), listed on the National Register of Historic Places in Story County, Iowa
- Melligan Store-Agriculture Hall, Port Hope, Michigan, listed on the National Register of Historic Places in Huron County, Michigan
- Agriculture Hall (Madison, Wisconsin), listed on the National Register of Historic Places in Dane County, Wisconsin
