= Sleeper House =

Sleeper House may refer to:

- Beauport (Gloucester, Massachusetts), also known as the Sleeper–McCann House
- Albert E. Sleeper House, Bad Axe, Michigan
- Charles H. Moore–Albert E. Sleeper House, Lexington, Michigan
