= W. R. Stafford Worker's House =

- U.S. National Register of Historic Places
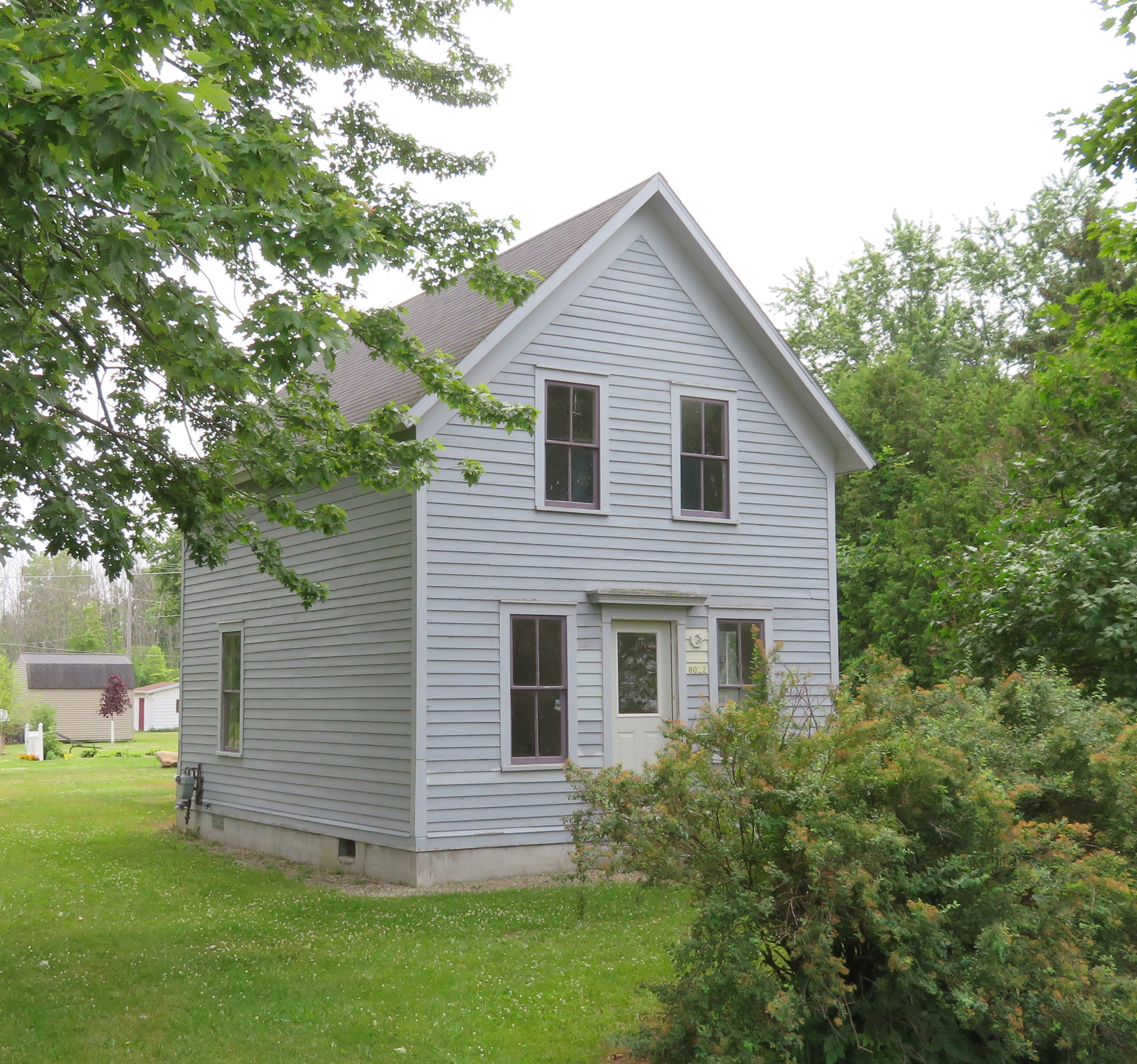

- Location within Michigan Location within the United States
- Interactive map
- Location: 8022 Cedar St., Port Hope, Michigan
- Coordinates: 43°56′22″N 82°42′40″W
- Area: less than one acre
- Built: 1875
- Architectural style: Vernacular End-Gable
- MPS: Port Hope MPS
- NRHP reference No.: 87001978
- Added to NRHP: November 20, 1987

The W. R. Stafford Worker's House, also known as the Blue Town House, is a private house located at 8022 Cedar Street in Port Hope, Michigan. It was listed on the National Register of Historic Places in 1987.

== History ==
This house was likely built in the 1870s, or possibly the 1860s, as one of a set of six houses. The houses were built for workers employed by W.R. Stafford in his salt block or agricultural operations. This house likely was for a married worker and his family.

== Description ==
The Blue Town House is a narrow-fronted, two-story, vernacular end-gable structure with a single story ell projecting to the rear. The structure is sheathed with clapboard, and has simple raking Greek Revival cornices without returns ad entrance trim. The windows are double-hung, two-over-two units. In the interior, the first floor contains a living room, a dining room, a kitchen, and a staircase to the second floor. The second floor space is divided into front and rear rooms.
