= Rubicon Township, Michigan =

Township in Michigan, USA

- Civil township
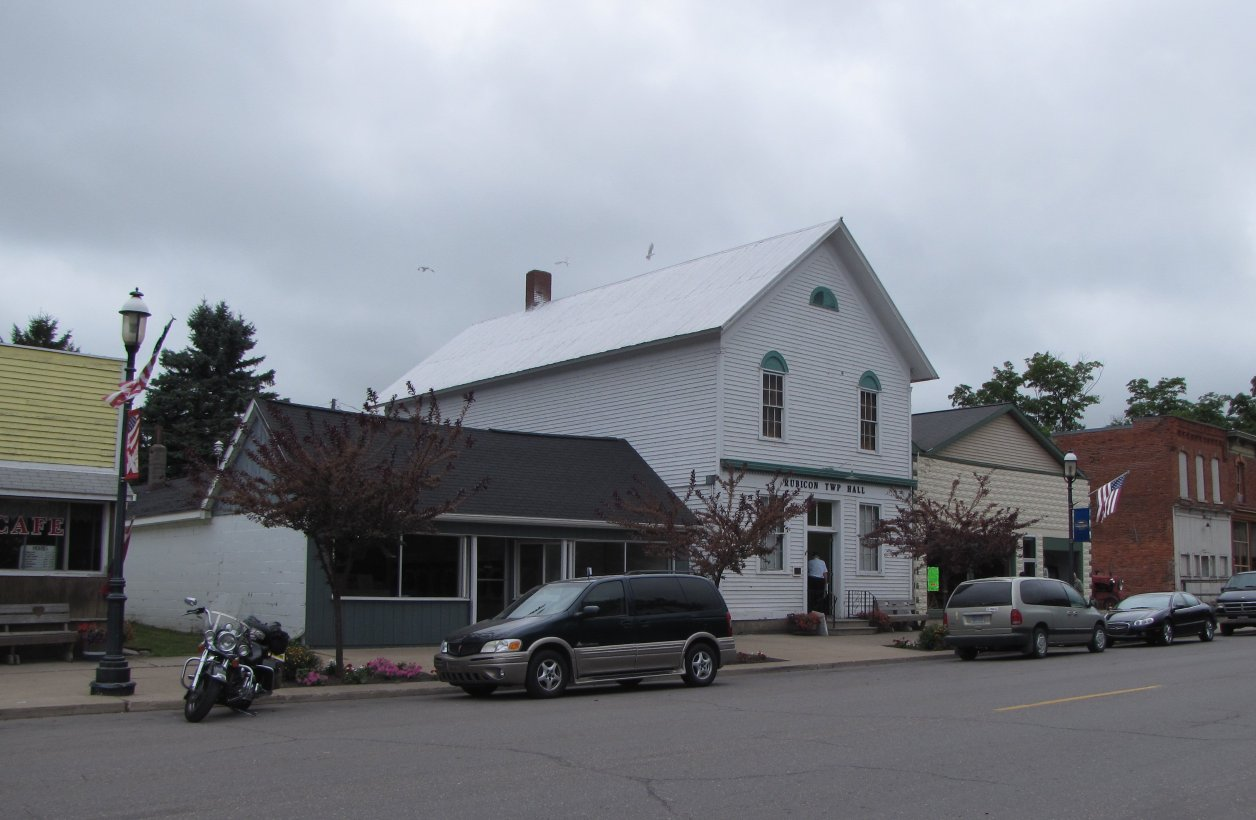
- Rubicon Township Hall in Port Hope

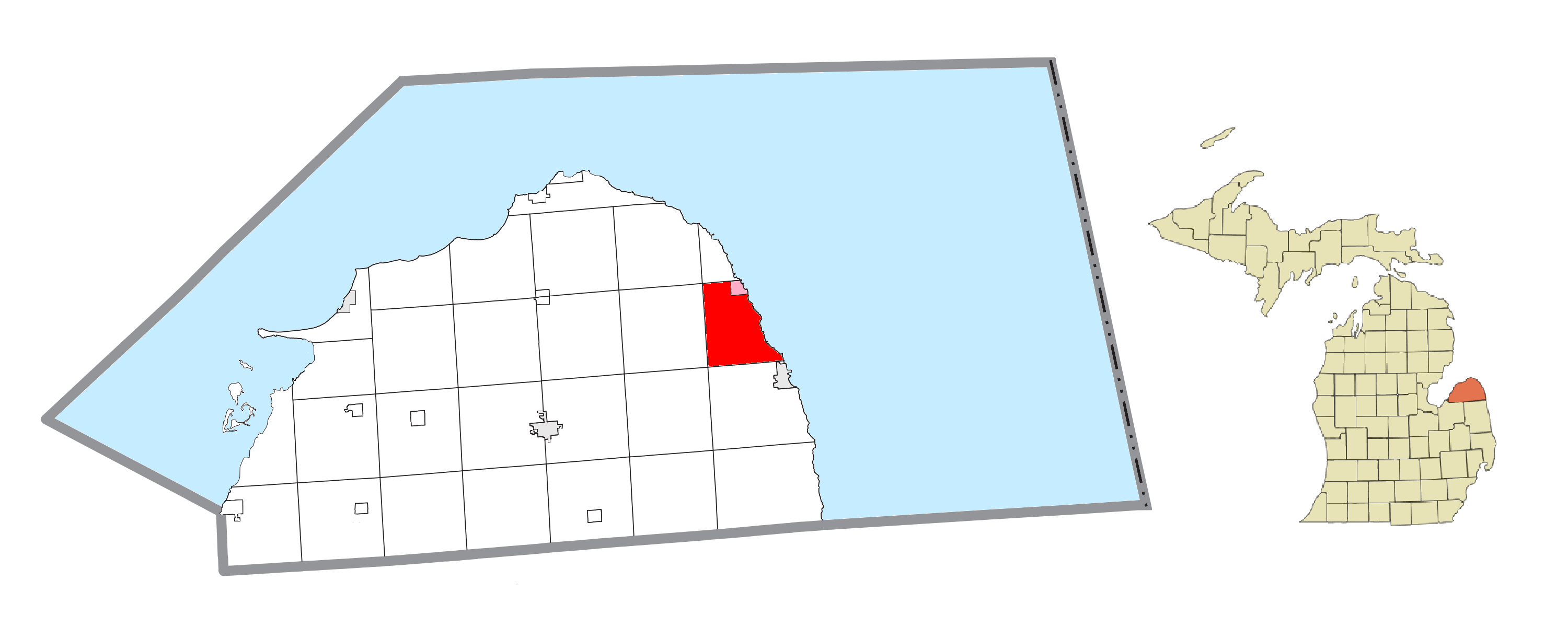
- Location within Huron County (red) and the administered village of Port Hope (pink)

- Location within the state of Michigan Rubicon Township (the United States)
- Coordinates: 43°54′50″N 82°42′52″W
- Country: United States
- State: Michigan
- County: Huron

Area
  - Total: 23.7 sq mi (61.5 km^{2})
  - Land: 23.7 sq mi (61.5 km^{2})
  - Water: 0.039 sq mi (0.1 km^{2})
- Elevation: 653 ft (199 m)

Population (2020)
  - Total: 705
  - Density: 29.7/sq mi (11.5/km^{2})
- Time zone: UTC-5 (Eastern (EST))
  - Summer (DST): UTC-4 (EDT)
- ZIP code(s): 48441, 48468
- Area code: 989
- FIPS code: 26-70140
- GNIS feature ID: 1627014

Rubicon Township is a civil township of Huron County in the U.S. state of Michigan. The population was 705 at the 2020 census.

== Communities ==
- The village of Port Hope is within the township on M-25.

== Geography ==
According to the United States Census Bureau, the township has a total area of 23.8 square miles (62 km^{2}), of which 23.7 square miles (61 km^{2}) is land and 0.04 square miles (0.10 km^{2}) (0.08%) is water.

== Demographics ==
As of the census of 2000, there were 778 people, 317 households, and 226 families residing in the township. The population density was 32.8 inhabitants per square mile (12.7/km^{2}). There were 528 housing units at an average density of 22.2 per square mile (8.6/km^{2}). The racial makeup of the township was 98.71% White, 0.77% Native American, 0.13% Asian, 0.13% from other races, and 0.26% from two or more races. Hispanic or Latino of any race were 0.26% of the population.

There were 317 households, out of which 28.1% had children under the age of 18 living with them, 62.8% were married couples living together, 5.7% had a female householder with no husband present, and 28.4% were non-families. 24.3% of all households were made up of individuals, and 14.2% had someone living alone who was 65 years of age or older. The average household size was 2.44 and the average family size was 2.88.

In the township the population was spread out, with 23.1% under the age of 18, 5.7% from 18 to 24, 23.8% from 25 to 44, 23.9% from 45 to 64, and 23.5% who were 65 years of age or older. The median age was 43 years. For every 100 females, there were 103.1 males. For every 100 females age 18 and over, there were 103.4 males.

The median income for a household in the township was $33,359, and the median income for a family was $39,000. Males had a median income of $29,886 versus $19,250 for females. The per capita income for the township was $16,012. About 3.0% of families and 4.6% of the population were below the poverty line, including 1.1% of those under age 18 and 7.7% of those age 65 or over.
