= W. R. Stafford Planing Mill Site =

- U.S. National Register of Historic Places
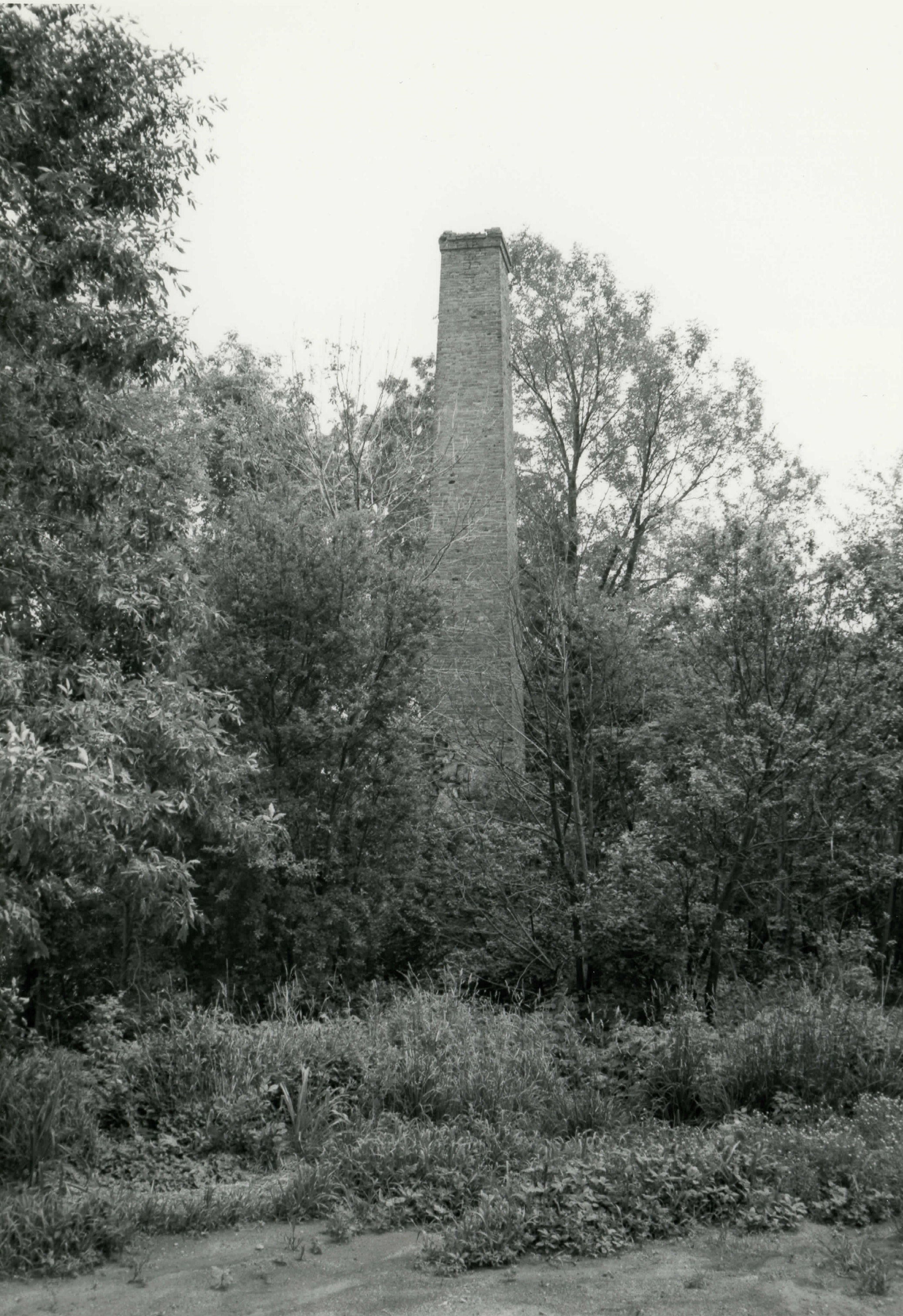
- W.R. Stafford Planing Mill Site, 1985

- Location within Michigan Location within the United States
- Interactive map
- Location: Huron St., Port Hope, Michigan
- Coordinates: 43°56′29″N 82°42′27″W
- Area: less than one acre
- Built: 1882
- MPS: Port Hope MPS
- NRHP reference No.: 87001960
- Added to NRHP: November 20, 1987

The W. R. Stafford Planing Mill Site was the site of a mill, located on Huron Street in Port Hope, Michigan. The site was listed on the National Register of Historic Places in 1987.

== History ==
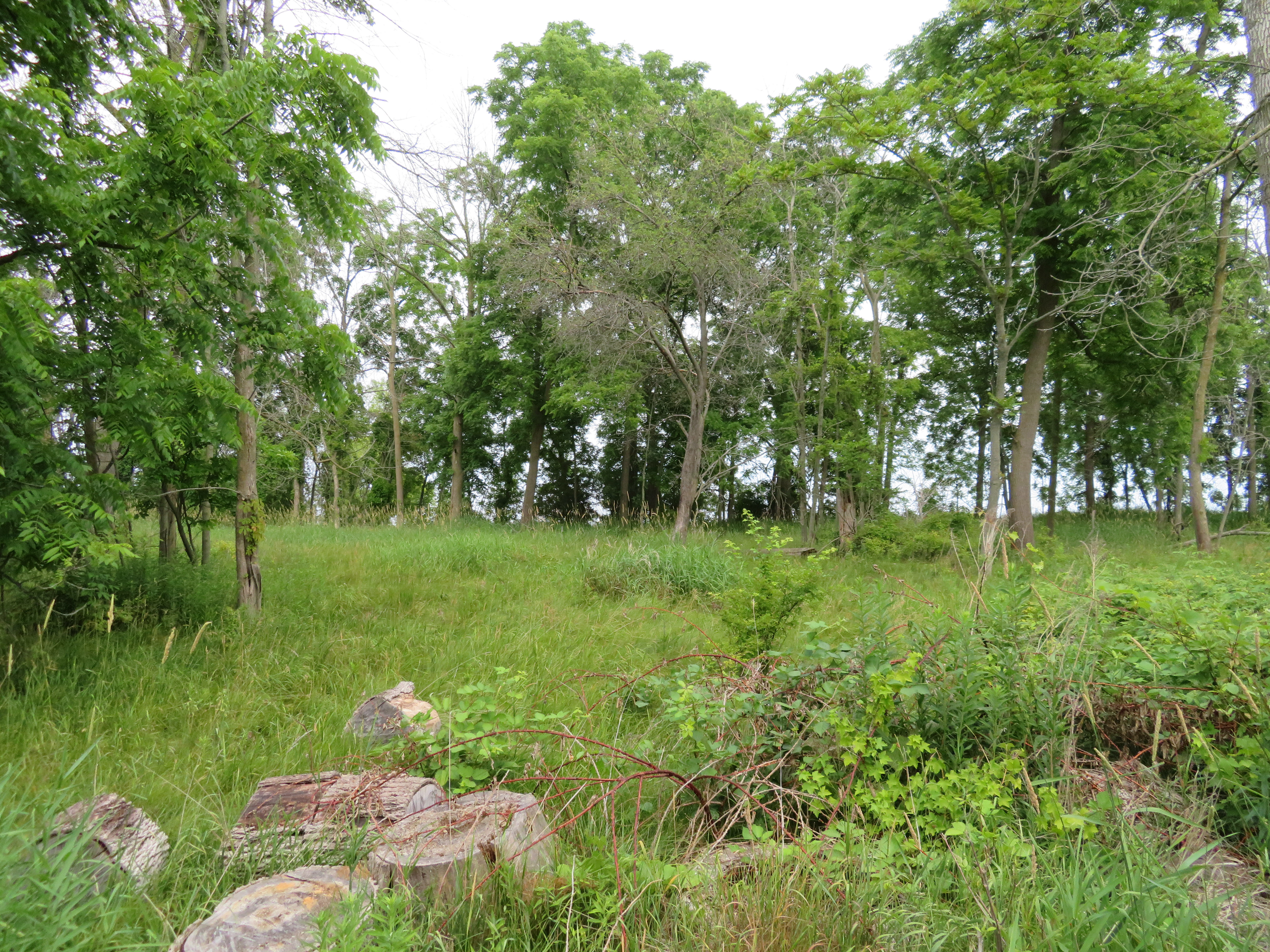
Planing Mill Site in 2018

After the disastrous forest fire of 1881, a planing mill building was constructed at this site. Planing mill opened in about 1882. The mill building contained a planing mill on the first floor and sash and door factory run by Duncan McKenzie and George Drury on the second floor. The planing mill and associated factory were major employers in the area at the end of the 19th century, as the lumbering trade wound down. The operation closed in the mid-1890s. In 1905, the building was leased to Gustave Marquardt and to use a pea mill, where peas were cleaned and sacked. In 1912, disease destroyed the local pea crop, and the business shut down. The mill building was eventually torn down, and as of 1987, only the chimney was left. As of 2017, the chimney was also gone.

== Description ==
The planing mill site sits in the woods near the shore of Lake Huron. It contains the foundations of the old mill, measuring about 80 feet by 36 feet. The site also contained at one time a 50-foot high chimney, measuring six feet six inches by six feet at the base. The chimney was constructed of red brick and tapered upward.
