= St. John's Lutheran Church (Port Hope, Michigan) =

Historic church in Michigan, United States

- U.S. National Register of Historic Places
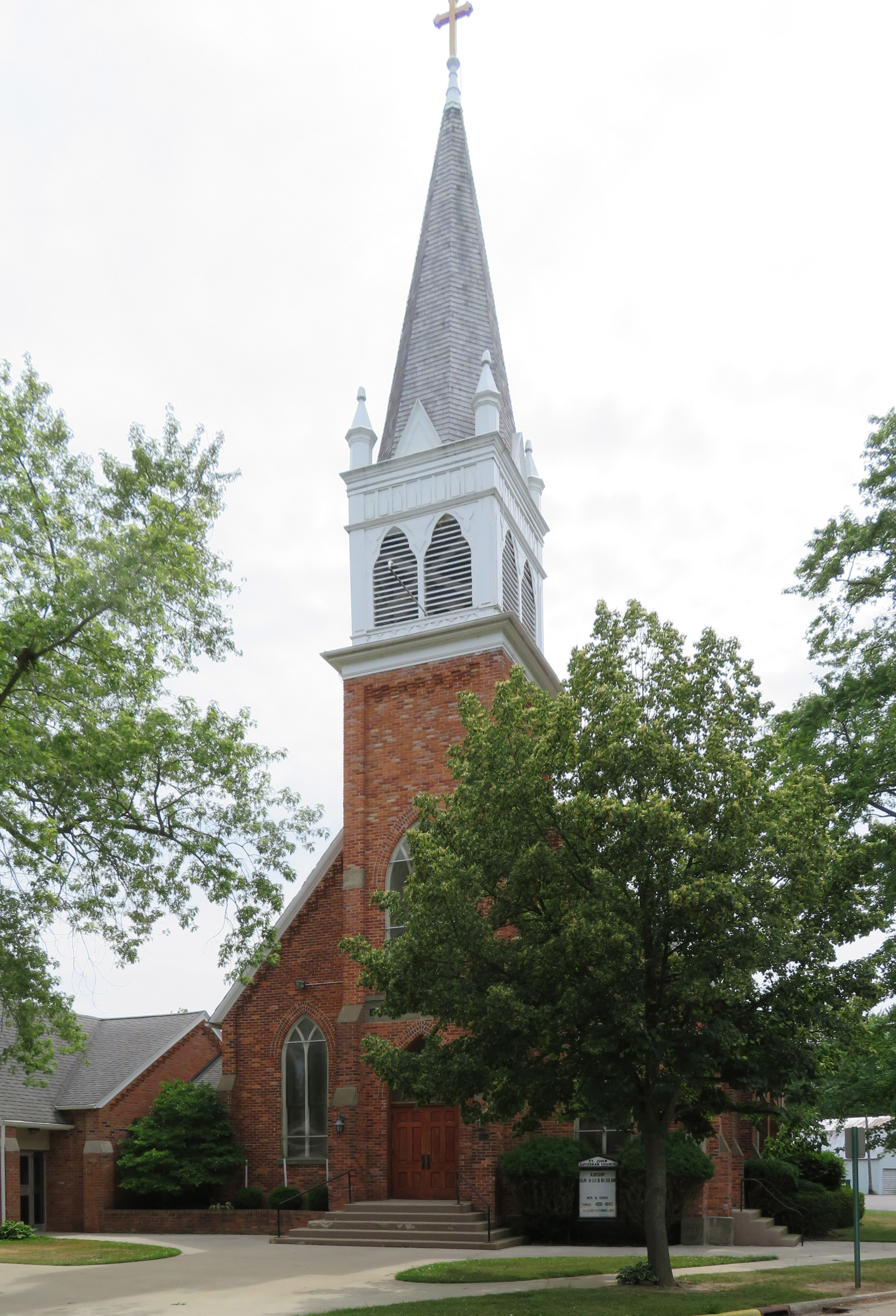

- Location within Michigan Location within the United States
- Interactive map
- Location: 4527 Second St., Port Hope, Michigan
- Coordinates: 43°56′26″N 82°43′7″W
- Area: less than one acre
- Built: 1899
- Architectural style: Gothic
- MPS: Port Hope MPS
- NRHP reference No.: 87001964
- Added to NRHP: November 20, 1987

St. John's Lutheran Church is a historic Lutheran church in Huron County, Michigan. It is located at 4527 Second St. in Port Hope, Michigan. The Victorian Gothic style church was built in 1899. It was added to the National Register in 1987.

== History ==
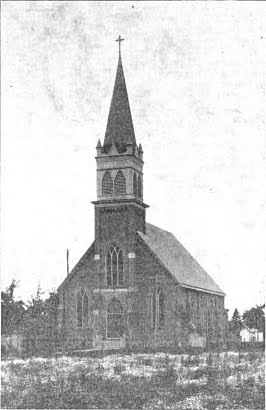
St John Lutheran in 1922

The St. John's Lutheran Church congregation in Port Hope was established in 1868. In 1870, Rev. W. Schwartz, a traveling missionary, took charge of the congregation, and soon, with the arrival of more settlers, the congregation grew. In 1871, the congregation constructed a frame church on this site. By 1876, the congregation was large enough to warrant its own pastor. By 1899, the earlier structure proved inadequate, and the congregation constructed this one. A wing was added in 1981. The church still serves the original congregation.

== Description ==
St. John's Lutheran Church is long and narrow brick Gothic structure with a steeply pitched gable roof. The front facade is symmetrical, with a central projecting square-plan tower topped with a wooded belfry and spire. Along the sides are pointed-arch windows filled with stained glass, separated by stone-trimmed, brick buttresses. A rear, gable-roofed projection holds the chancel. On one side, attached via a short corridor, is a cross-gable-roof, one-story wing, added in 1981, with a style closely matching that of the original 1899 church.

Inside, the sanctuary contains stained wood pews flanking a central aisle. Above is a plaster ceiling, sloping on the sides and flat the center. In the rear is a gallery with the organ.
