= Isaac Leuty House =

- U.S. National Register of Historic Places
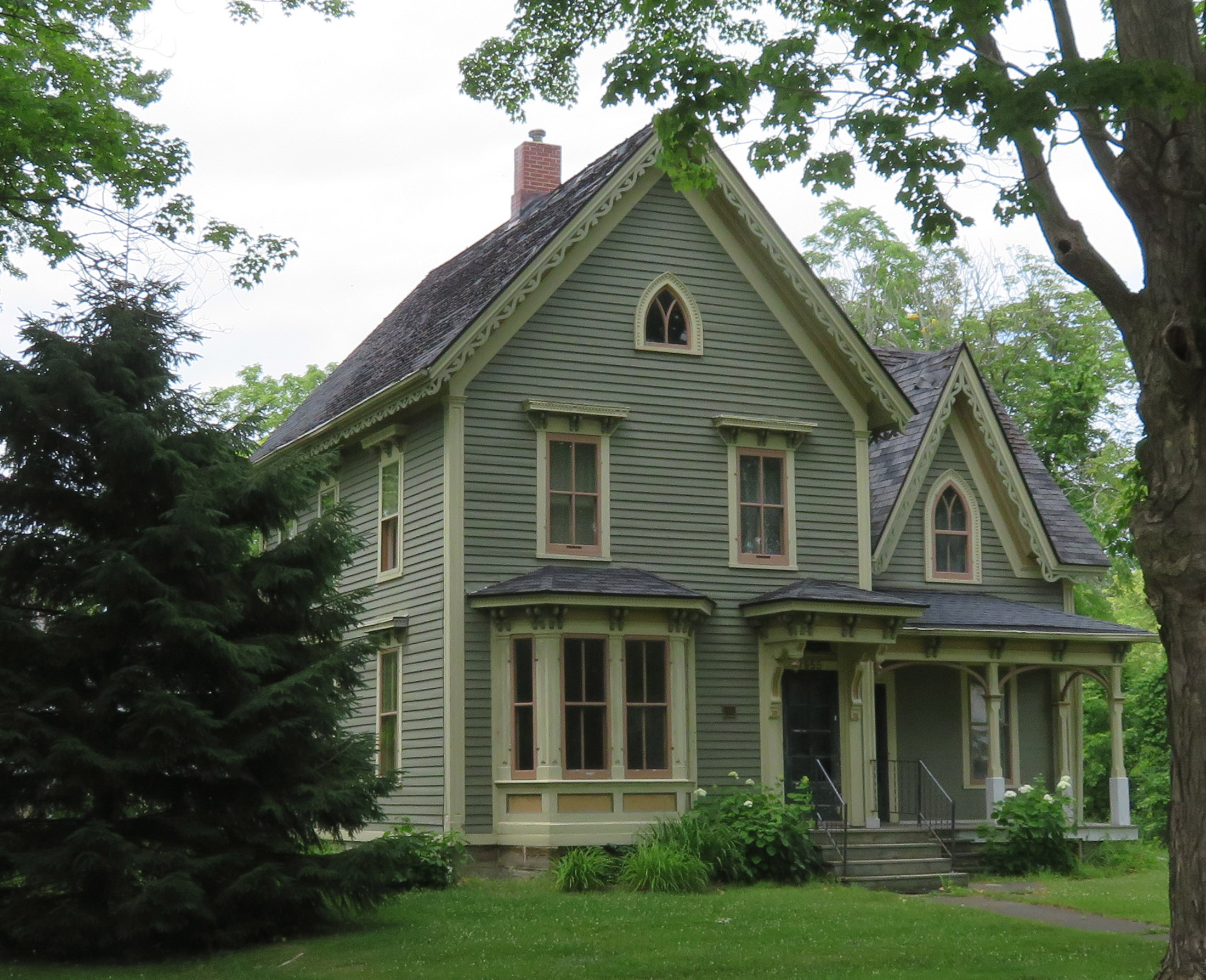

- Location within Michigan Location within the United States
- Interactive map
- Location: 7955 School St., Port Hope, Michigan
- Coordinates: 43°56′26″N 82°42′54″W
- Area: less than one acre
- Built: 1874
- Architectural style: Gothic Revival
- MPS: Port Hope MPS
- NRHP reference No.: 87001975
- Added to NRHP: November 20, 1987

The Isaac Leuty House is a private home located at 7955 School Street in Port Hope, Michigan. It was listed on the National Register of Historic Places in 1987.

== History ==
Isaac Leuty was born in 1812 in Whitley Bay, England, and emigrated to America in 1832. He settled in Lexington, Michigan in the 1840s. He became partners in a general store, and in 1845 joined with Darius Cole to establish a nearby sawmill. They sold the mill in 1852, and Leuty moved back to Lexington. At some time between the late 1850s and early 1870s he moved to Port Hope. His daughter married W.R. Stafford, an early pioneer and wealthy businessman in the area. Leuty served as a bookkeeper in Stafford's general store. In 1874, Stafford deeded the land that this house stands on to Leuty. It is likely that the house was built at about the same time.

== Description ==
The Leuty House is an L-shaped, frame, two-story, Gothic Revival structure. Gothic details include the continuous undulating bargeboard under the house's eaves and pointed-arch headed windows in the front gables. The remaining windows have square heads with heavy molded caps supported by pairs of brackets. Similar paired-bracket cornices are placed over the hooded front entrance, the small front porch, and the several slant-sided bay windows.
