= Masonic Temple (Port Hope, Michigan) =

- U.S. National Register of Historic Places
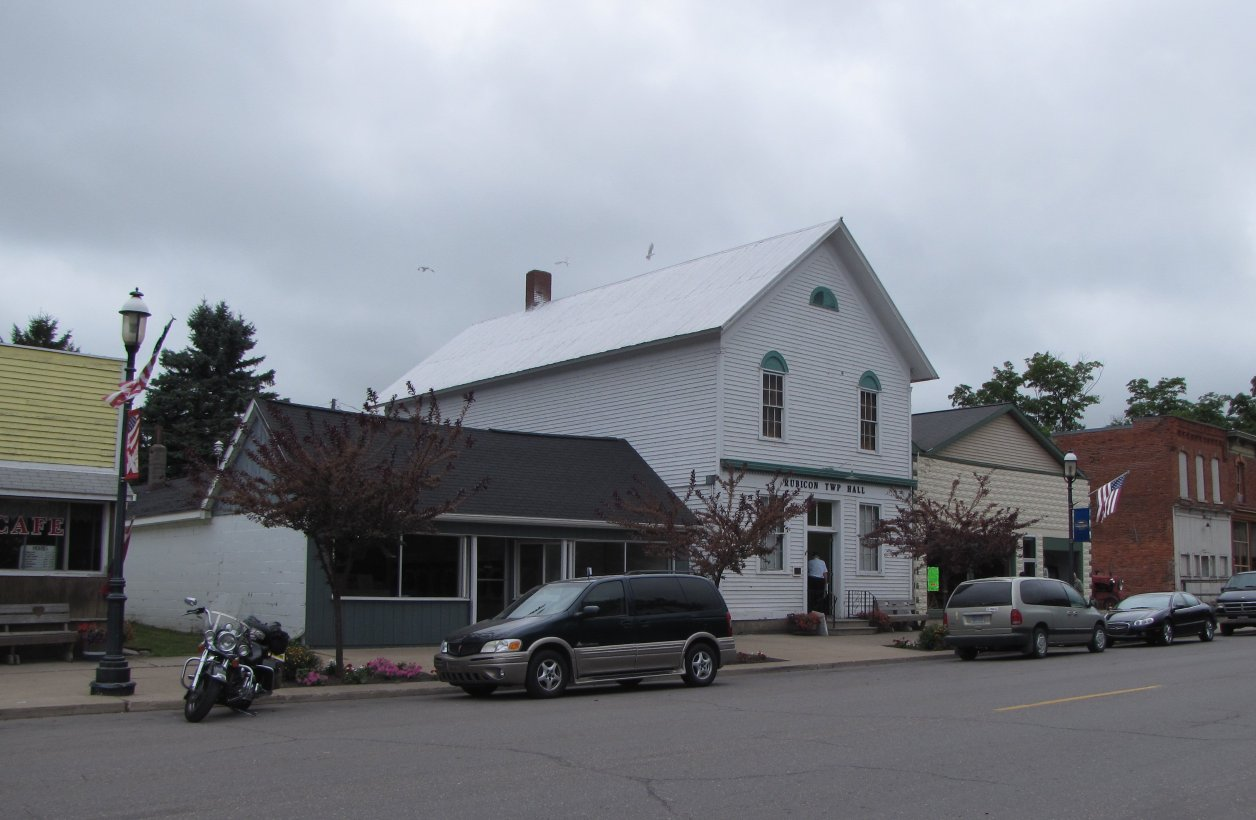

- Location within Michigan Location within the United States
- Interactive map
- Location: 4425 Main St., Port Hope, Michigan
- Coordinates: 43°56′28″N 82°42′48″W
- Area: less than one acre
- Built: 1867
- Architectural style: Greek Revival
- MPS: Port Hope MPS
- NRHP reference No.: 87001962
- Added to NRHP: November 20, 1987

The Masonic Temple in Port Hope, Michigan is a fraternal lodge constructed in 1867. It was listed on the National Register of Historic Places in 1987. it is now used as the Rubicon Township Hall.

== History ==
The Port Hope Masonic Lodge No. 138 was chartered in 1863. Just four years later, in 1867, the Masons constructed this building with two meeting halls, the upper one exclusively for the use of the Masons and the lower one for hosting community events. Over the years, the building served as the main social and public building of Port Hope, hosting township elections as well as community suppers, band concerts, and school plays. The building eventually became the Rubicon Township Hall.

== Description ==
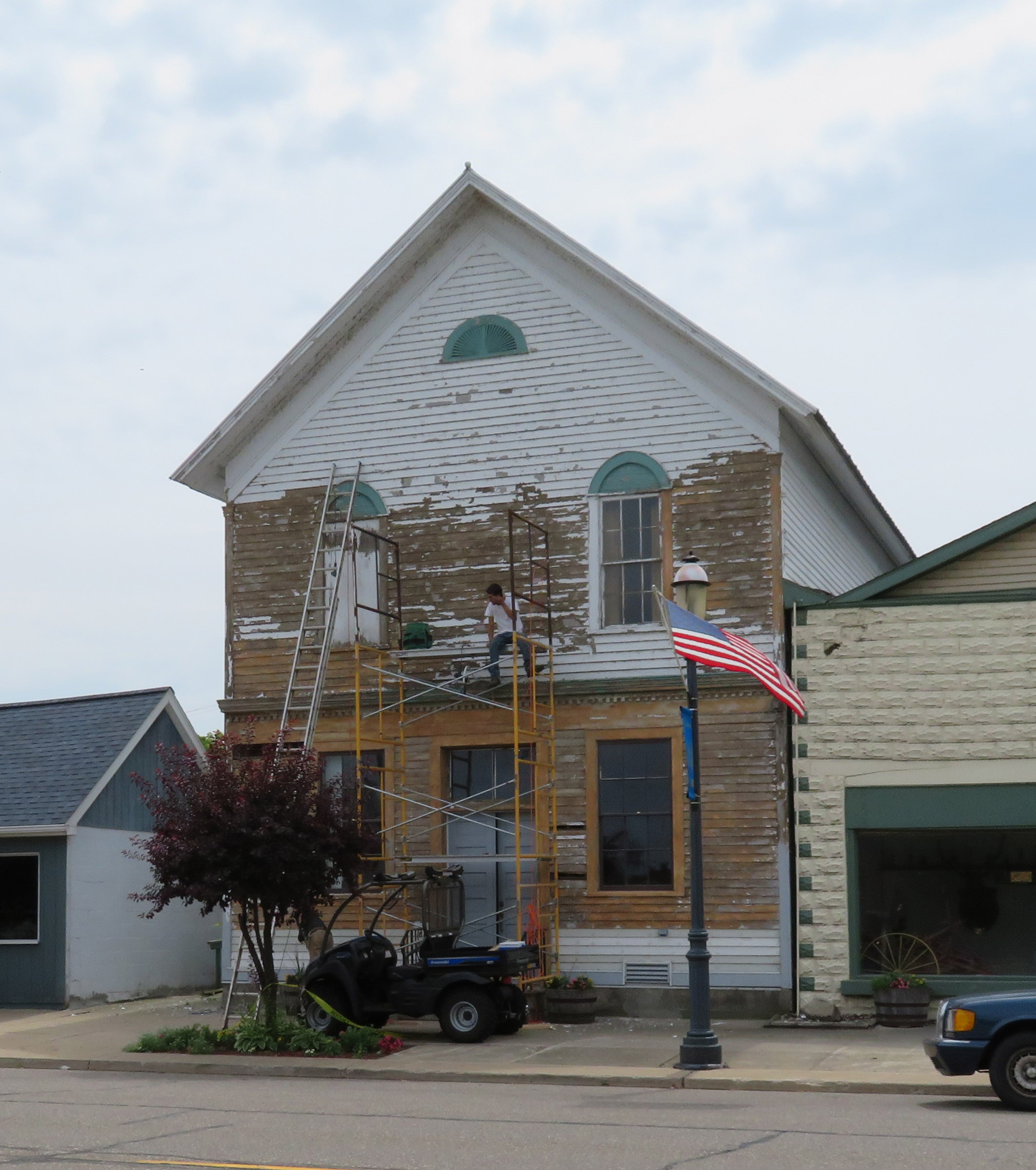
Masonic Temple 2018

The Masonic Temple and Rubicon Township Hall is a narrow-, gable-fronted, two-story structure covered with clapboarded structure. Its architecture is vernacular, with a "smattering" of Greek Revival/Classical Revival elements, including narrow corner boards with stylized capitals. An architrave and frieze bands, topped with box cornices, runs across the top of the building. A subsidiary cornice with dentils runs above the first floor. The entrance is through a square-head entryway, and the second-floor window are capped with fanlight-like caps.

The building's gable-front, two-story design with simple Greek Revival elements may echo the design of an 1864 store that town founder Stafford built (but which was burned in 1902).
