= First Methodist Episcopal Church (Port Hope, Michigan) =

Historic church in Michigan, United States

- U.S. National Register of Historic Places
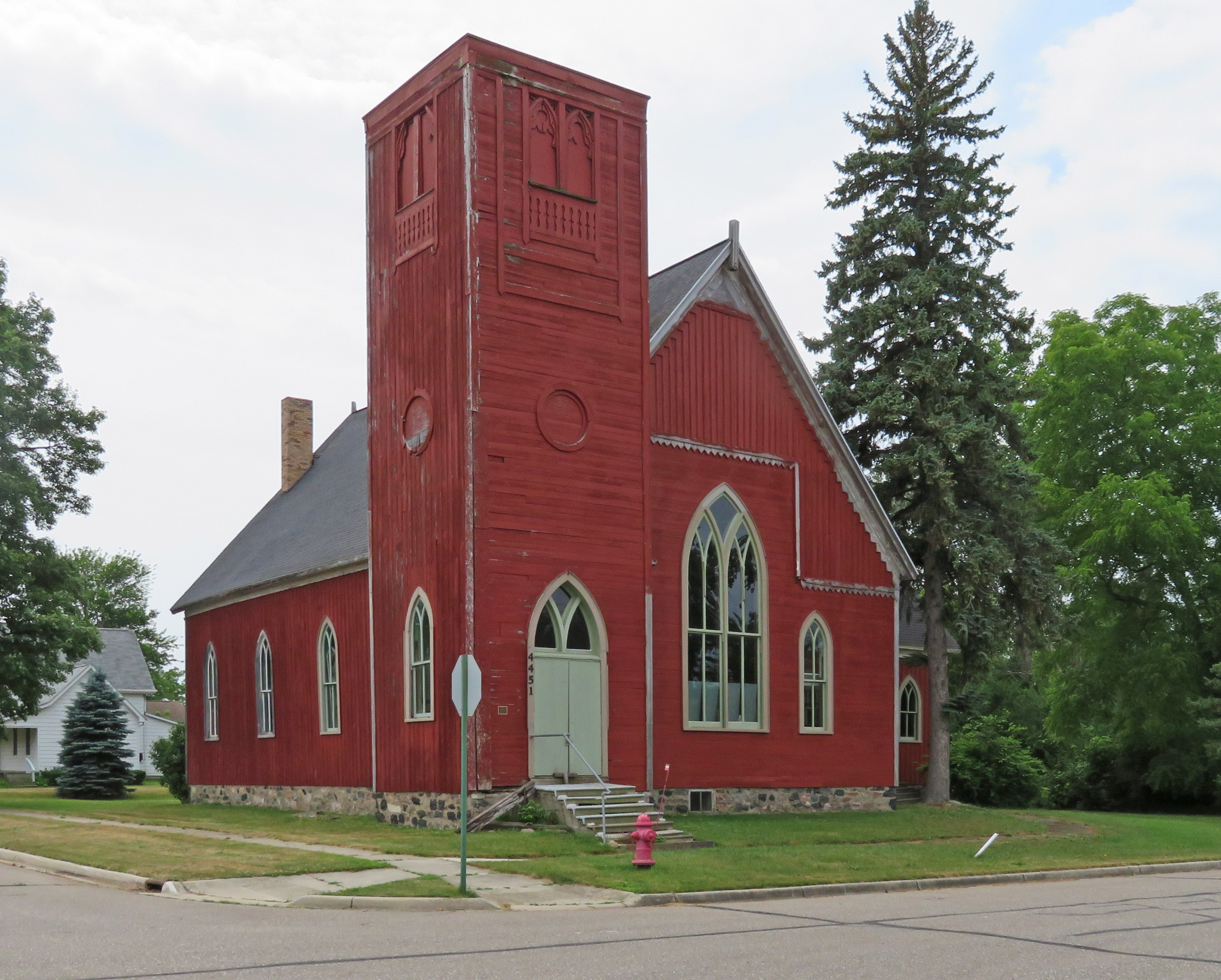

- Location within Michigan Location within the United States
- Interactive map
- Location: 4451 Second St., Port Hope, Michigan
- Coordinates: 43°56′22″N 82°42′59″W
- Area: less than one acre
- Built: 1880
- Built by: John Geltz, John Crew
- Architectural style: Gothic
- MPS: Port Hope MPS
- NRHP reference No.: 87001963
- Added to NRHP: November 20, 1987

The First Methodist Episcopal Church, also known as the Red Church, is a historic church located at 4451 Second Street in Port Hope, Michigan. It was listed on the National Register of Historic Places in 1987.

== History ==
The First Methodist Episcopal Church in Port Hope was established in August, 1858 by a circuit-riding preacher. The congregation constructed this church building for a place to worship in 1880–82. Although the names of the architect and carpenter are not known, it is known that John Geltz and John Crew did the masonry and plastering work. The building served the local Methodist congregation until 1936, when they merged with the local Presbyterian congregation. After this, the building was used for local gatherings and rented out for weddings and other events.

== Description ==
The Red Church is an L-shaped, gable-roof, frame structure located at the intersection of Second and School Streets. The church measures 60 feet by 38 feet, and has an asymmetrical front façade, with a tower at the front corner nearest the intersection. The exterior is clad in vertical board and batten siding, with the exception of the front of the tower and front wall of the sanctuary below the gable, where the siding consists of horizontal boarding. The church is nominally Gothic in style, with a steeply pitched roof and Gothic arched head openings for the door and windows. The interior contains a small vestibule in the tower base, with the sanctuary behind. Two sets of folding doors connect the sanctuary to the adjacent lecture room. Only a few pews remain in the sanctuary, but the original interior surface treatments remain, including matched board dados and ceiling.
