= W. R. Stafford Flour Mill and Elevator =

- U.S. National Register of Historic Places
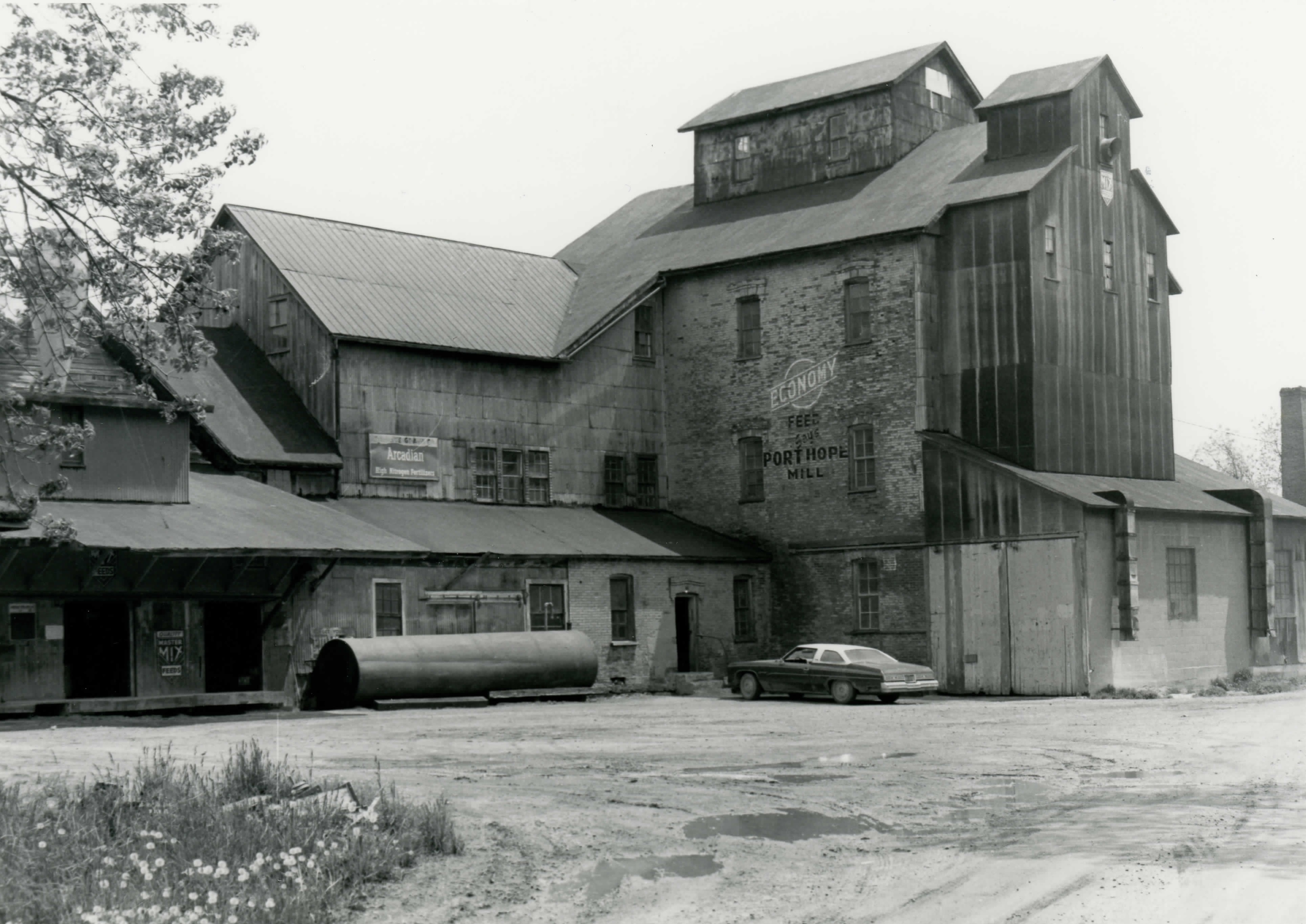
- W.R. Stafford Flour Mill and Elevator, 1987

- Location within Michigan Location within the United States
- Interactive map
- Location: 4310 Huron St., Port Hope, Michigan
- Coordinates: 43°56′31″N 82°42′29″W
- Area: 1 acre (0.40 ha)
- Built: 1875
- Demolished: early 2000s
- MPS: Port Hope MPS
- NRHP reference No.: 87001961
- Added to NRHP: November 20, 1987

The W. R. Stafford Flour Mill and Elevator was a mill located at 4310 Huron Street in Port Hope, Michigan. It was listed on the National Register of Historic Places in 1987 and demolished in the early 2000s.

== History ==
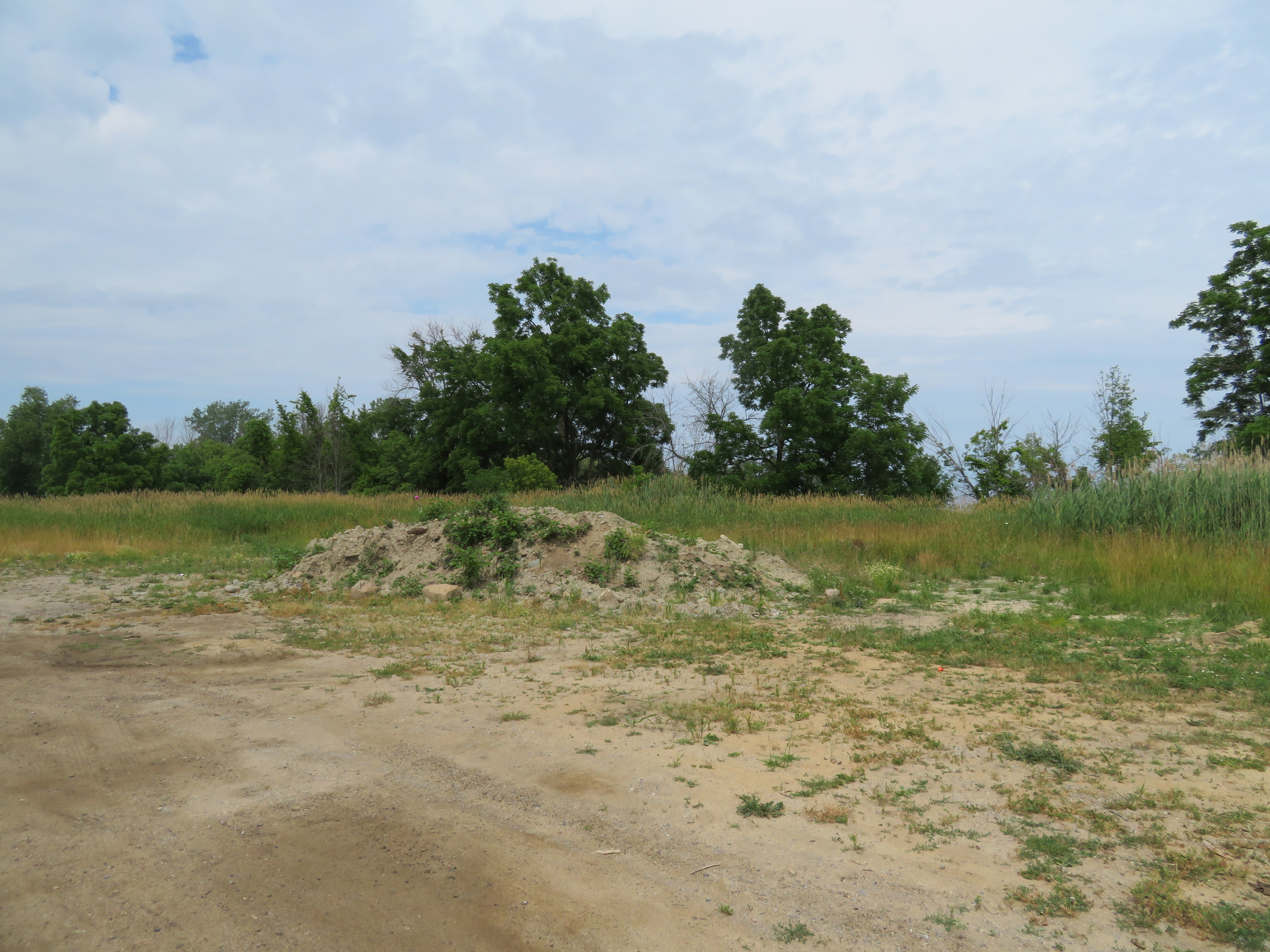
Site in 2018

The original portion of this mill, a small grist mill, was constructed in the 1870s or possibly slightly before. Two major additions were constructed in 1882 and 1886, reflecting the switch in the local economy from lumbering to agriculture The original section of the mill was used for grinding small grist, buckwheat and feed, while the 1882 addition was used to mill flour. The 1886 additional included a grain elevator. The mill operated under the name StafforRoller Mills and Elevator until owner W.R. Stafford's death in 1916. Afterwards, Stafford's son and son-in-law operated it as the Stafford Milling Company. Flour milling halted around the time f World War I. By the 1980s, the mill did custom grinding of feed. and served as storage for grains and feed. The mill was demolished in the early 2000s.

== Description ==
The mill complex was an L-shaped, gable-roof, timber-frame structure, with a number of shed-roof extensions. There were three sections: A low structure at the north end of the complex (likely the original grist mill), a higher middle section from 1882, and a large 1886 elevator building. The two older parts were originally covered with vertical board and batten, the 1886 section with a veneer of dark red brick. Later, early 20th-century steel sheeting was applied to most of the exterior. The interior of the mill was open, exposing large 11 x 10 and 12 x 12-inch timbers.
