= Herman House =

- U.S. National Register of Historic Places
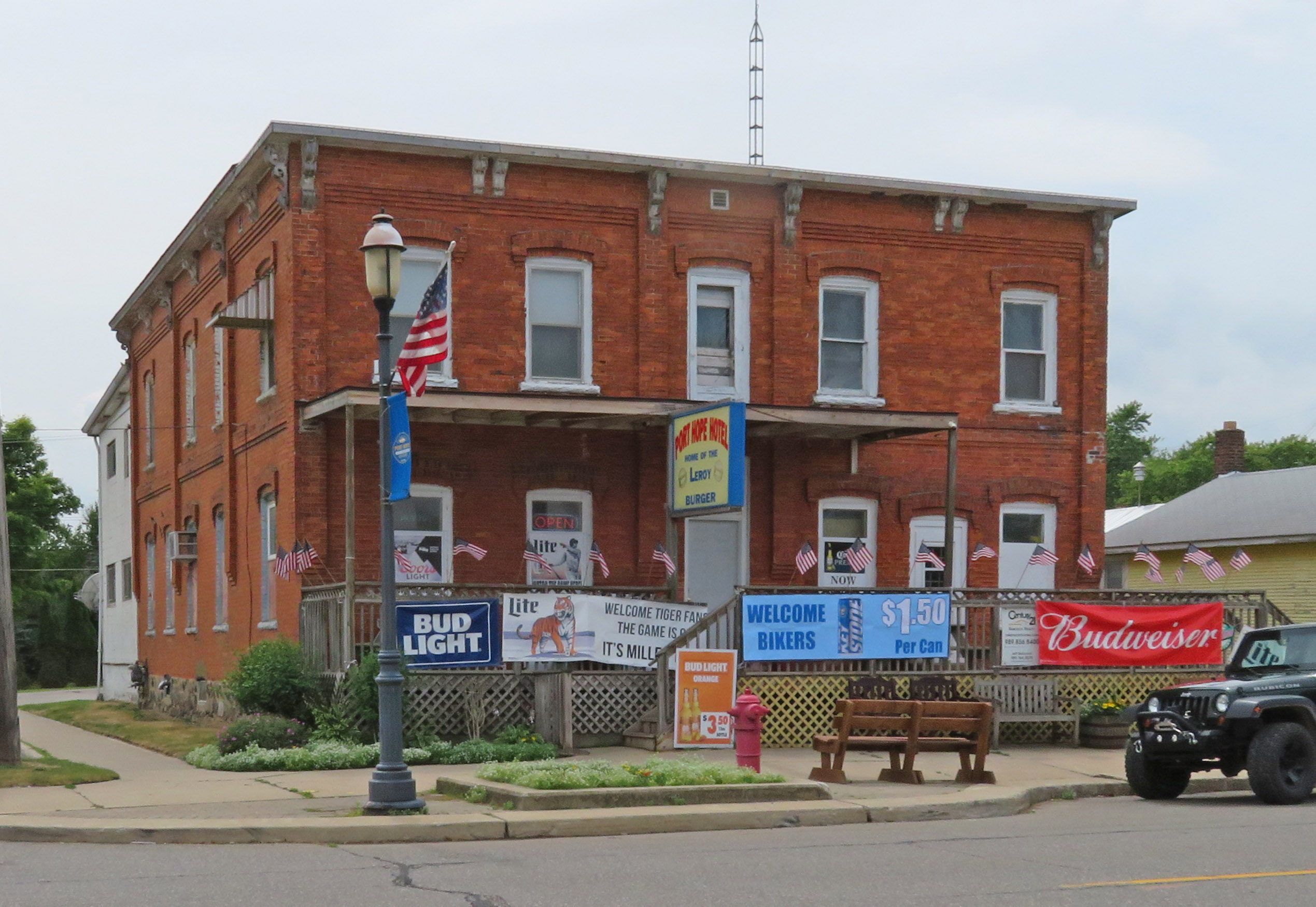

- Location within Michigan Location within the United States
- Interactive map
- Location: 4405 Main St., Port Hope, Michigan
- Coordinates: 43°56′27″N 82°42′46″W
- Area: less than one acre
- Built: 1900
- Architectural style: Italianate
- MPS: Port Hope MPS
- NRHP reference No.: 87001974
- Added to NRHP: November 20, 1987

The Herman House, also known as the Lake View Hotel, was built as a hotel, located at 4405 Main Street in Port Hope, Michigan. It was listed on the National Register of Historic Places in 1987. The building now houses a restaurant, the Port Hope Hotel.

== History ==
In 1900, the only hotel in Port Hope was the Lease House. Richard Herman, sensing an opportunity, constructed this hotel, which quickly supplanted the Lease House. By 1902, the Lease House had closed, but plans were being made to extend the railroad line to Port Hope, allowing easier access for travelers. In anticipation, Herman enlarged his hotel in 1902-03. The railroad line was finished, and Herman sold his hotel to J . H. De Lisle in 1906. De Lisle renamed the establishment the Lake View Hotel two years later. The Lake View Hotel continued to operate under a succession of owners. As of 2017, the building houses a restaurant, the Port Hope Hotel.

== Description ==
The Herman House is a two-story, four-square, red brick Italianate building. A modern cinder block addition, painted white, is located at the rear. The walls of the original 1900 section are divided by belt courses and brick pilasters. A plain classical cornice supported by brackets runs across the top. The window and doorway openings have segmental-arch heads and raised brick caps. A modern wood porch fronts the building. On the interior, the first floor houses a bar/restaurant, and the second floor contains four sleeping rooms on either side of a central hall.
