= Ogilvie Building =

- U.S. National Register of Historic Places
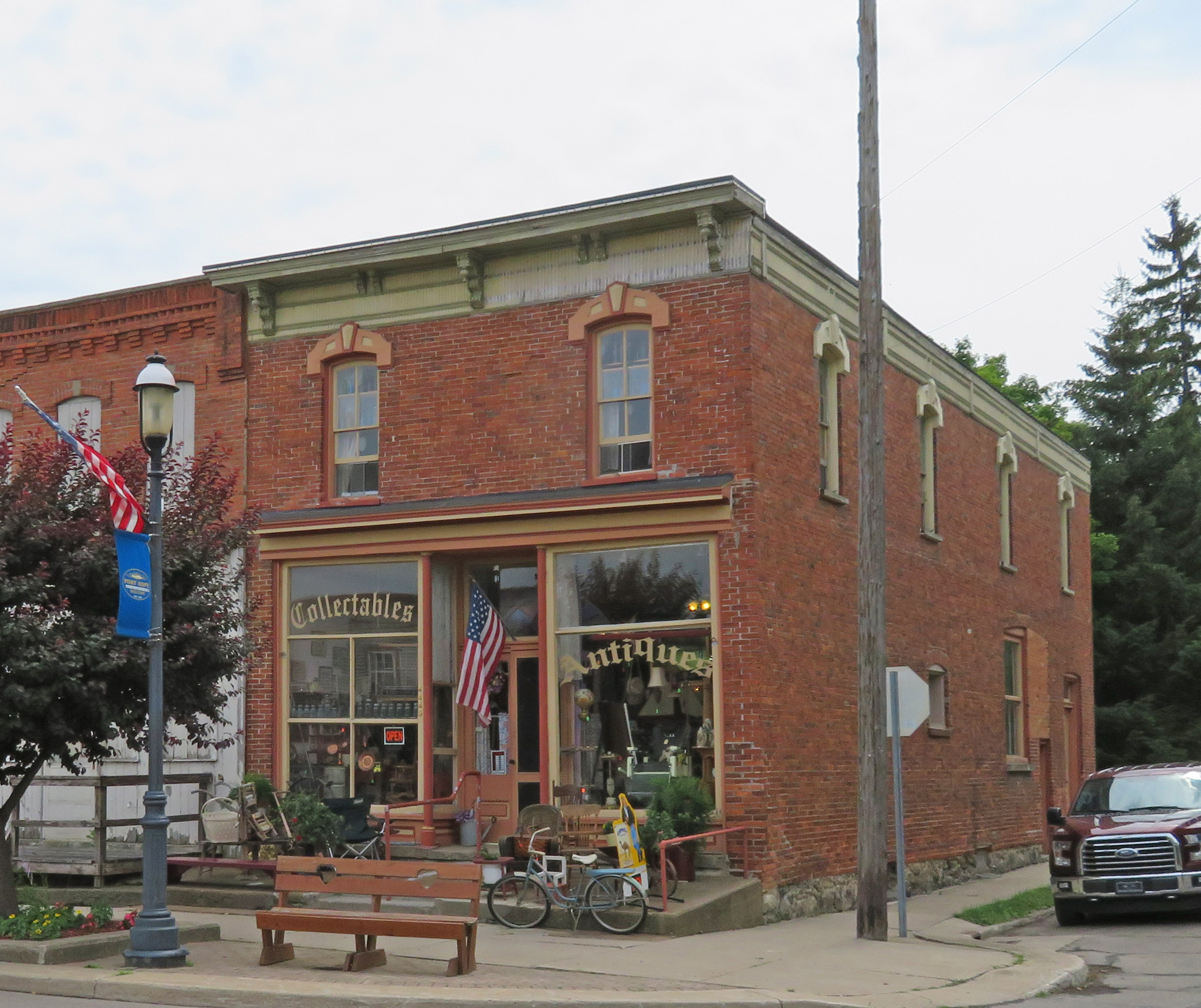

- Location within Michigan Location within the United States
- Interactive map
- Location: 4443 Main St., Port Hope, Michigan
- Coordinates: 43°56′29″N 82°42′49″W
- Area: less than one acre
- Built: 1885
- Architectural style: Italianate
- MPS: Port Hope MPS
- NRHP reference No.: 87001973
- Added to NRHP: November 20, 1987

The Ogilvie Building is a commercial building located at 4443 Main Street in Port Hope, Michigan. It was listed on the National Register of Historic Places in 1987.

== History ==
Dr. Robert C. Ogilvie was born in 1849 in Campbellford, Ontario. He graduated from the University of Toronto Medical Department in 1870 and moved to Port Hope to establish a medical practice and start a drug store. His first drug store was located at this site, and he soon expanded it to include groceries. In early 1885, he moved the original building and construction on this building began in July. It was completed by November 1885. The main floor originally house Ogilvie's drug store. Ogilvie had other business interests, including a dock, mill and cooperage. In 1891, he formed a medical partnership with Dr. Lewis Fleckinstein, and in 1892 sold the drug and grocery store to Fleckinstein and Clark Bisbee. In 1895 Ogilvie moved to Superior, Wisconsin. The second story of the building remained unfinished until the 1930s, when the Leonard Brothers bought the building and finished an apartment on the second floor.

== Description ==
The Ogilvie Building is a two-story deep red brick commercial building on Port Hope's Main Street. The storefront is symmetrical with a recessed center double-door entrance flanked by cast-iron columns and a paired-bracket cornice running above. There is a high transom above the entry doors and ceiling-height front windows set on low panels. The storefront has not been significantly altered from its original 1885 appearance. The main cornice above the second story is supported by sets of brackets. The second floor has segmental-arch-head windows with pressed-metal caps and keystones. The store interior has a pressed-metal ceiling.
