= W. R. Stafford Saw Mill Site =

- W.R Stafford Saw Mill Site
- U.S. National Register of Historic Places
- Michigan State Historic Site
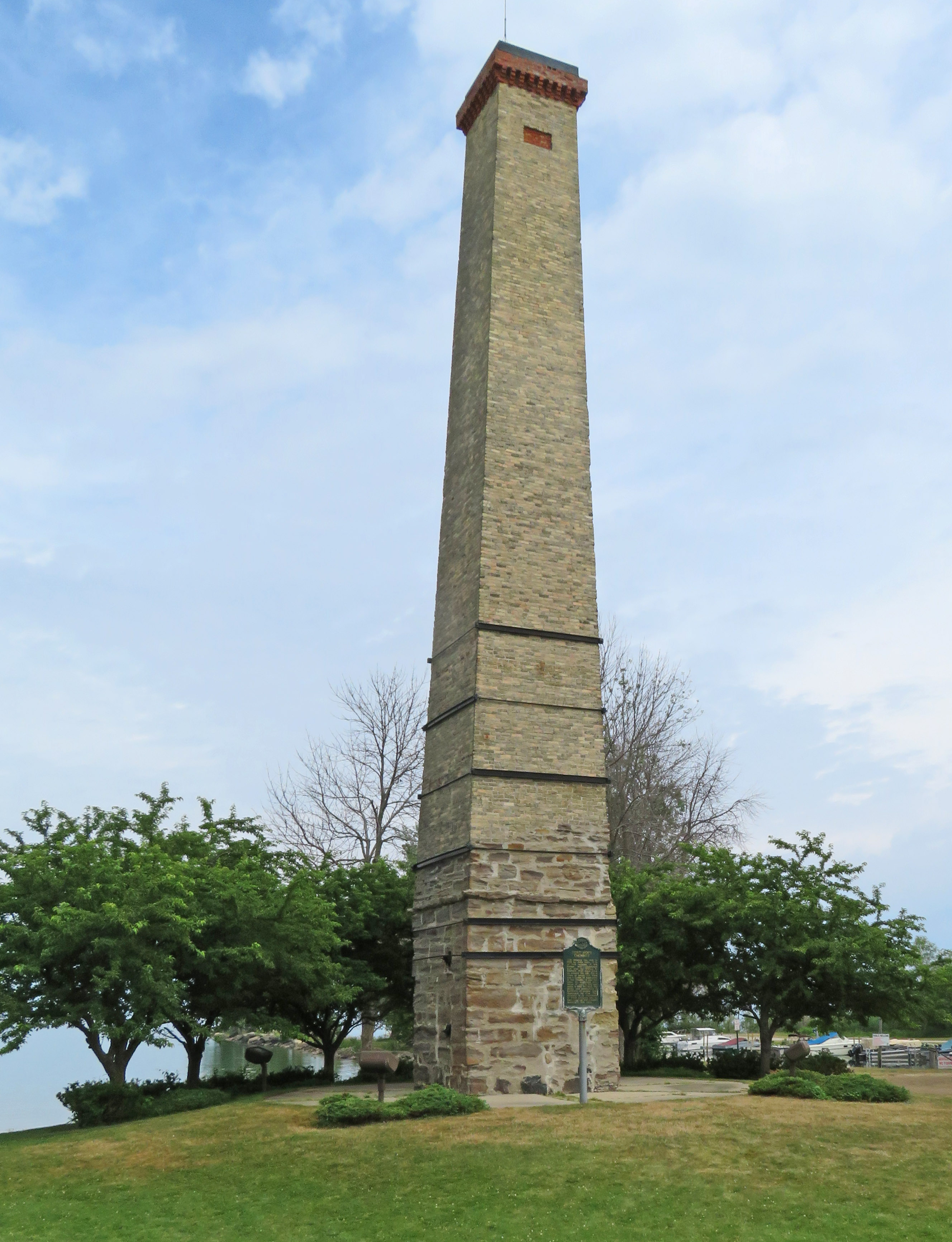
- Site in 2018

- Location within Michigan Location within the United States
- Interactive map
- Location: 4451 Huron St., Port Hope, Michigan
- Coordinates: 43°56′37″N 82°42′32″W
- Area: 4.5 acres (1.8 ha)
- Built: 1858
- Built by: John Geltz
- MPS: Port Hope MPS
- NRHP reference No.: 87001959
- Added to NRHP: November 20, 1987

The W.R Stafford Saw Mill Site, containing the remnants of a mid-1800s saw mill, is located at 4451 Huron Street (at the foot of State Street on the shore of Lake Huron) in Port Hope, Michigan. The only remaining visible structure standing is the chimney of the mill (known as the Port Hope Chimney), and the site is now used as part of the Stafford County Park. The site was listed on the National Register of Historic Places in 1987.

== History ==
The first saw mill constructed at this site was built in 1858 for lumberman William R. Stafford. The mill had a stone chimney built by mason John Geitz. The original 1858 mill, along with the associated docks and the houses of hundreds of workers, was destroyed by fire in 1871. The mill was rebuilt in 1872, but destroyed by fire a second time in 1881. The mill was rebuilt again, and remained in use until probably the early 1890s. The 1858 chimney was used by all three mills.

The mill and associated buildings sat unused for decades. The dock into the lake was destroyed in a 1913 storm, and the last building was removed in 1941 by a local farmer, who converted it into a farm shed. Commonwealth Associates, Inc. of Jackson, Michigan performed a limited archaeological investigation of a part of the site in 1978 in connection with proposed improvements of the Stafford County Park, but a more complete study of the site has not been done.

== Description ==
The saw mill site is now part of a county park and includes parking, lawn, and beach areas. The site covers the area of the former 1858 saw mill, accompanying grounds, and the covered over or submerged remnants of the Stafford dock that once extended 1,000 feet into the lake. The dock was made of timber cribs filled with stone.

The last visible remnant of the mill is the 1858 chimney. The chimney stands just above the beach, and measures nine by ten feet along the ground, rising approximately 80 feet. The lower section of twenty feet is constructed of sandstone, and contains an open hearth on one side. The upper section of about 60 feet is constructed of red brick, and gradually tapers toward the top.
