= Melligan Store-Agriculture Hall =

- U.S. National Register of Historic Places
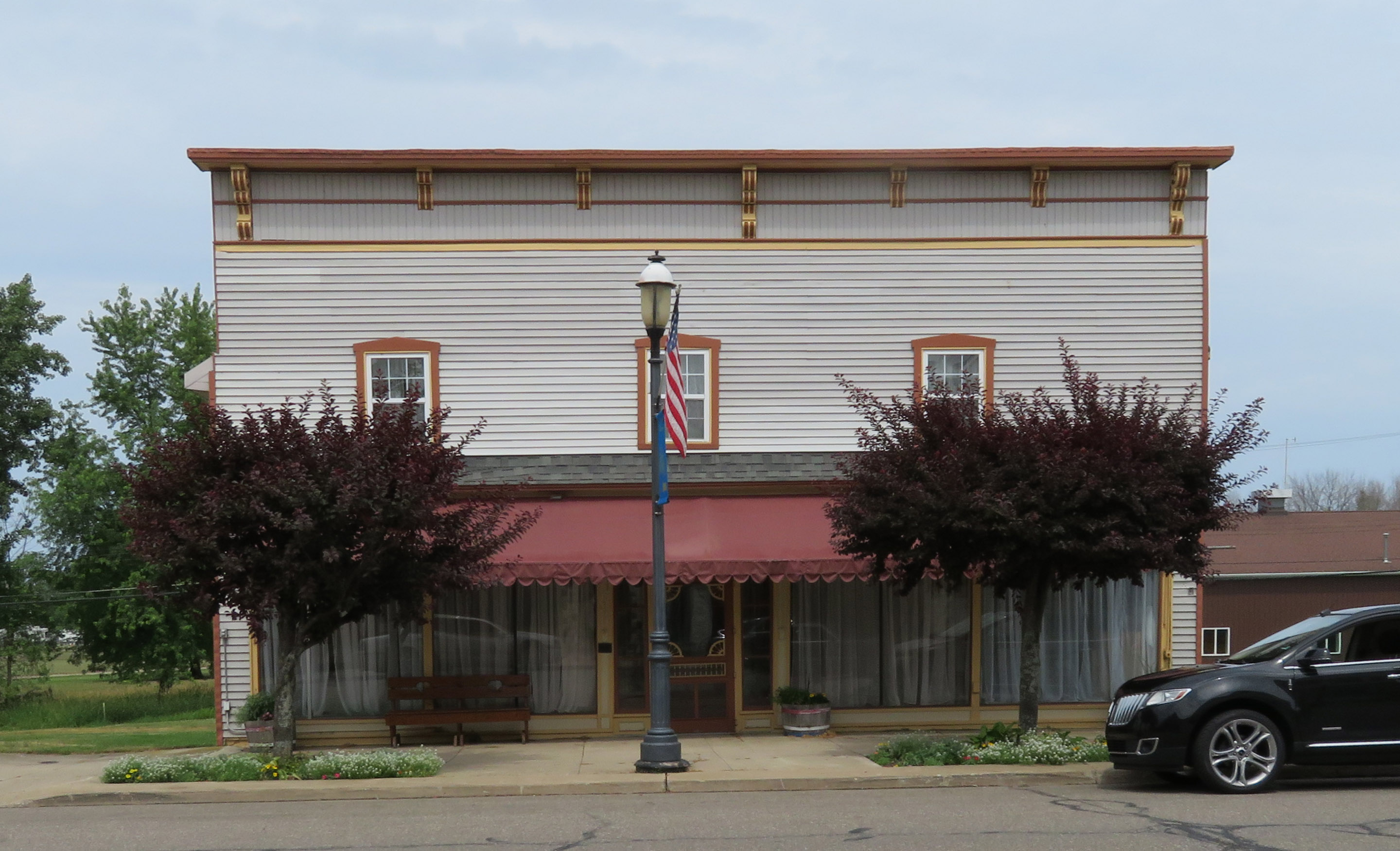

- Location within Michigan Location within the United States
- Interactive map
- Location: 4432 Main St., Port Hope, Michigan
- Coordinates: 43°56′30″N 82°42′46″W
- Area: less than one acre
- Built: 1884
- Architectural style: Italianate
- MPS: Port Hope MPS
- NRHP reference No.: 87001965
- Added to NRHP: January 4, 1988

The Melligan Store, also known as Agriculture Hall, is a commercial building located at 4432 Main Street in Port Hope, Michigan. It was listed on the National Register of Historic Places in 1988.

== History ==
The building, constructed in 1884, is probably the oldest commercial structure in Port Hope. A second section was added in 1886, and a large additional on the rear was constructed in 1903.

== Description ==
The building is a two-story, clapboarded Italianate commercial block with a false front.
