= Frederick H. and Elizabeth Stafford House =

- U.S. National Register of Historic Places
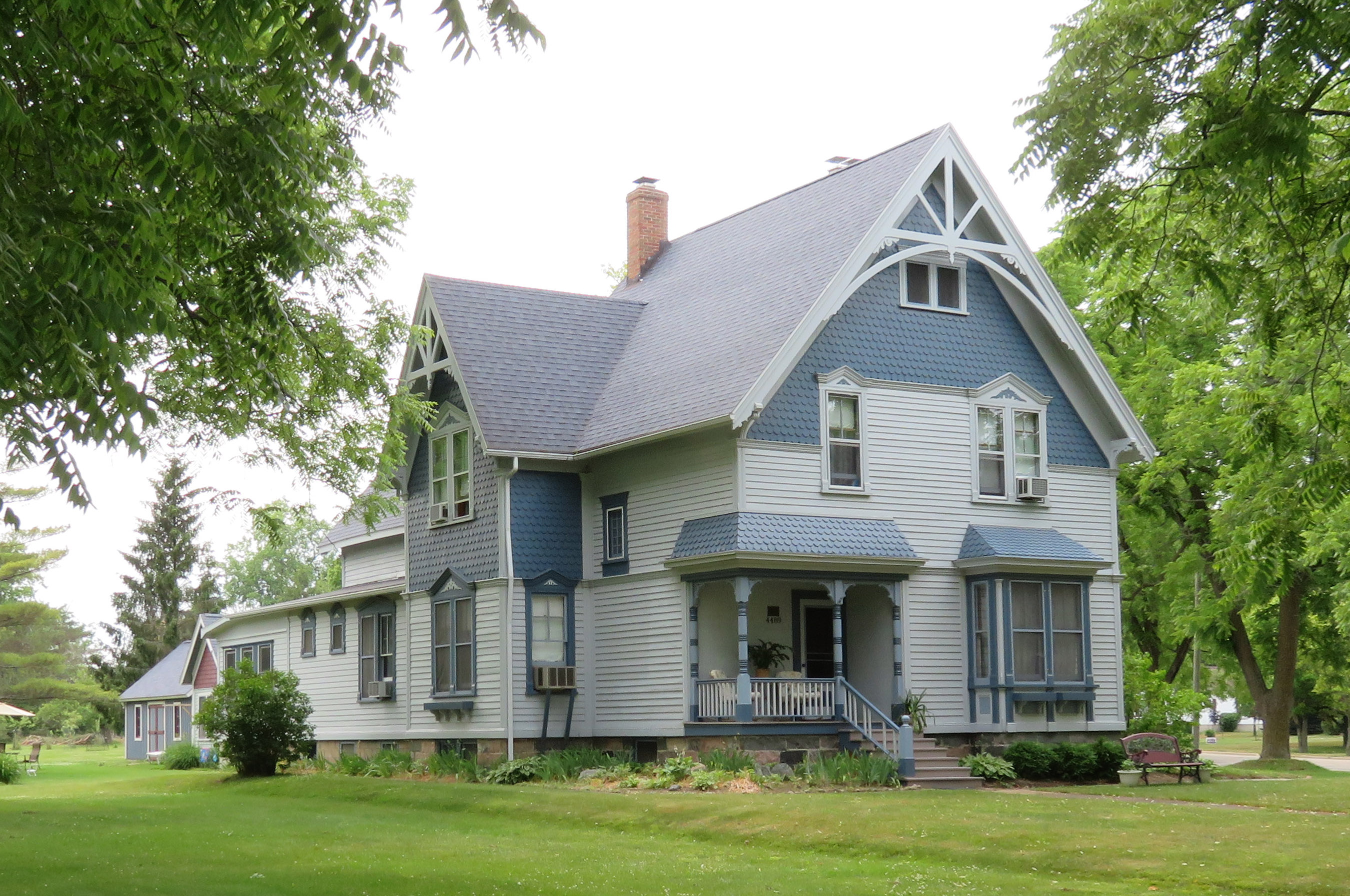

- Location within Michigan Location within the United States
- Interactive map
- Location: 4489 Main St., Port Hope, Michigan
- Coordinates: 43°56′30″N 82°42′53″W
- Area: less than one acre
- Built: 1886
- Architectural style: Stick/Eastlake
- MPS: Port Hope MPS
- NRHP reference No.: 87001976
- Added to NRHP: November 20, 1987

The Frederick H. and Elizabeth Stafford House was constructed as a private house, located at 4489 Main Street in Port Hope, Michigan. It was listed on the National Register of Historic Places in 1987.

== History ==
Fredrick H. Stafford was born in 1848 in Boston. He graduated from the Massachusetts Institute of Technology in 1872 with a degree in civil engineering, and moved to Michigan to work surveying a new railroad line between Detroit and Toledo. In 1874, he moved to Port Hope and went to work as an office manager for W. R. Stafford, a distant cousin. In 1886, Fredrick Stafford married Elizabeth Stafford, W. R. Stafford's daughter. W. R. Stafford constructed this house as a wedding present for the newly married couple.

W.R. Stafford died in 1916, Fredrick H. Stafford took over W.R.'s businesses, serving as proprietor of the Stafford Store and president of the Citizens Bank of Stafford, Smith & Co. He constructed an addition at the rear of the house in about 1919. Fredrick Stafford lived in this house until his own death in 1931. Afterward, Fredrick Stafford's son, William R. Stafford II, also lived here.

== Description ==
This house is a large, two-story, frame structure with a gable-roof main section and gable-roof wings on either side. The gables are steeply pitched and trimmed by plain bargeboards with brackets at the lower ends and open timberwork gable ornaments. The main body of the house is clad with clapboard, while the gables, the second stories of the side extensions, and the bay window and pent roof of the recessed front porch are shingled. The entrance is through a small front porch, recessed into a corner of the first floor. The porch has lathe-turned columns with brackets. The windows are double-hung, sash units, some of which have pedimented caps.
