= Navigation Structures at Harbor Beach Harbor =

Navigation structures in Michigan, United States

- U.S. National Register of Historic Places
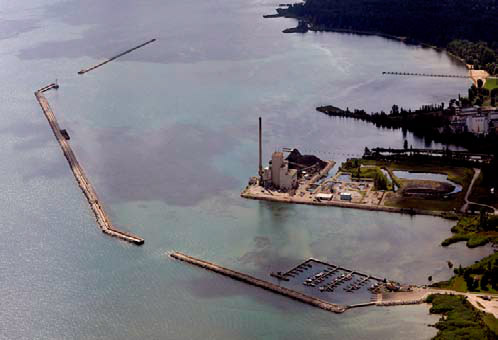

- Location within Michigan Location within the United States
- Interactive map
- Location: N. Lakeshore Dr., Harbor Beach, Michigan
- Coordinates: 43°50′54″N 82°38′15″W
- Area: 5.6 acres (2.3 ha)
- Built: 1873
- Architect: Major G. Weitzel, Charles P. Glibert,
- Architectural style: Utilitarian
- NRHP reference No.: 97000972
- Added to NRHP: September 11, 1997

The Navigation Structures at Harbor Beach Harbor are a series of breakwaters located in Lake Huron, on North Lakeshore Drive in Harbor Beach, Michigan. They were listed on the National Register of Historic Places in 1997.

== History ==
In the mid-1800s, sailing across Saginaw Bay could be risky, and the nearest refuge from oncoming storm was the mouth of the St. Clair River, 80 miles away. Laker captains requested the construction of a more accessible harbor, and in 1872 this location was chosen. Construction began in 1873. In 1875, a skeletal light tower was put in place to mark the location of the entrance to the partially completed harbor. The current Harbor Beach Light was constructed in 1885. That same year marked the end of breakwater construction; the entire project was completed at a cost of $975,000.

In 1903, the wooden breakwaters were found to be deteriorating, and the next year the Army Corps of Engineers began replacing the timber structures above the waterline with a concrete superstructure. The main breakwater was completed by 1909, with the north and south sections following in 1911/12 and 1916/17. Major rehabilitation was performed in the late 1960s / early 1970s, and again in the 1980s.

== Description ==
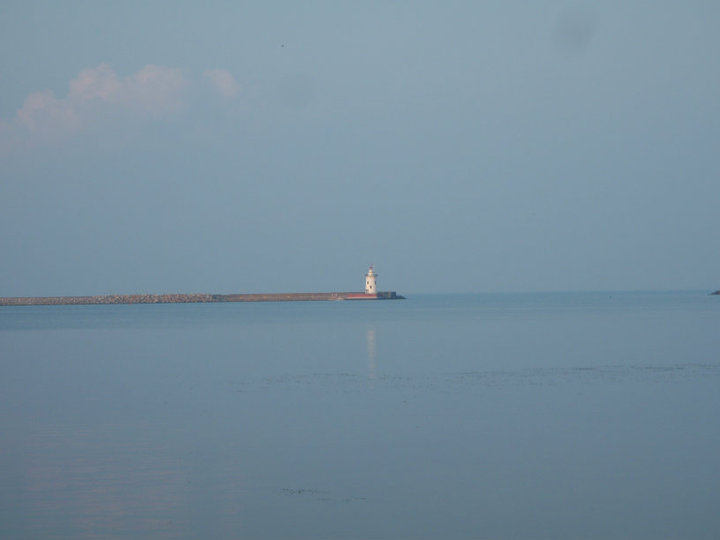
Harbor Beach Light on breakwater, from Bathing Beach Park

The navigation structures include nearly 7,900 feet of breakwater surrounding the Harbor Beach harbor. The breakwater is constructed of stone-filled cribwork, and is laid in three pieces; with the first running approximately 1500 feet eastward, beginning three-quarters of a mile north of the dock. There is a gap of about 300 feet to the next section of breakwater, which runs approximately 300 feet eastward, 3960 feet southeast, and another 300 feet east. There is a gap of 600 feet for the entrance, followed by the final section of breakwater which runs 1900 feet southward. The inner basin is dredged to a depth of 23 feet. The Harbor Beach Light is located on the breakwater at the mouth of the harbor. The breakwater is capped with concrete.
