= Smith-Culhane House =

- U.S. National Register of Historic Places
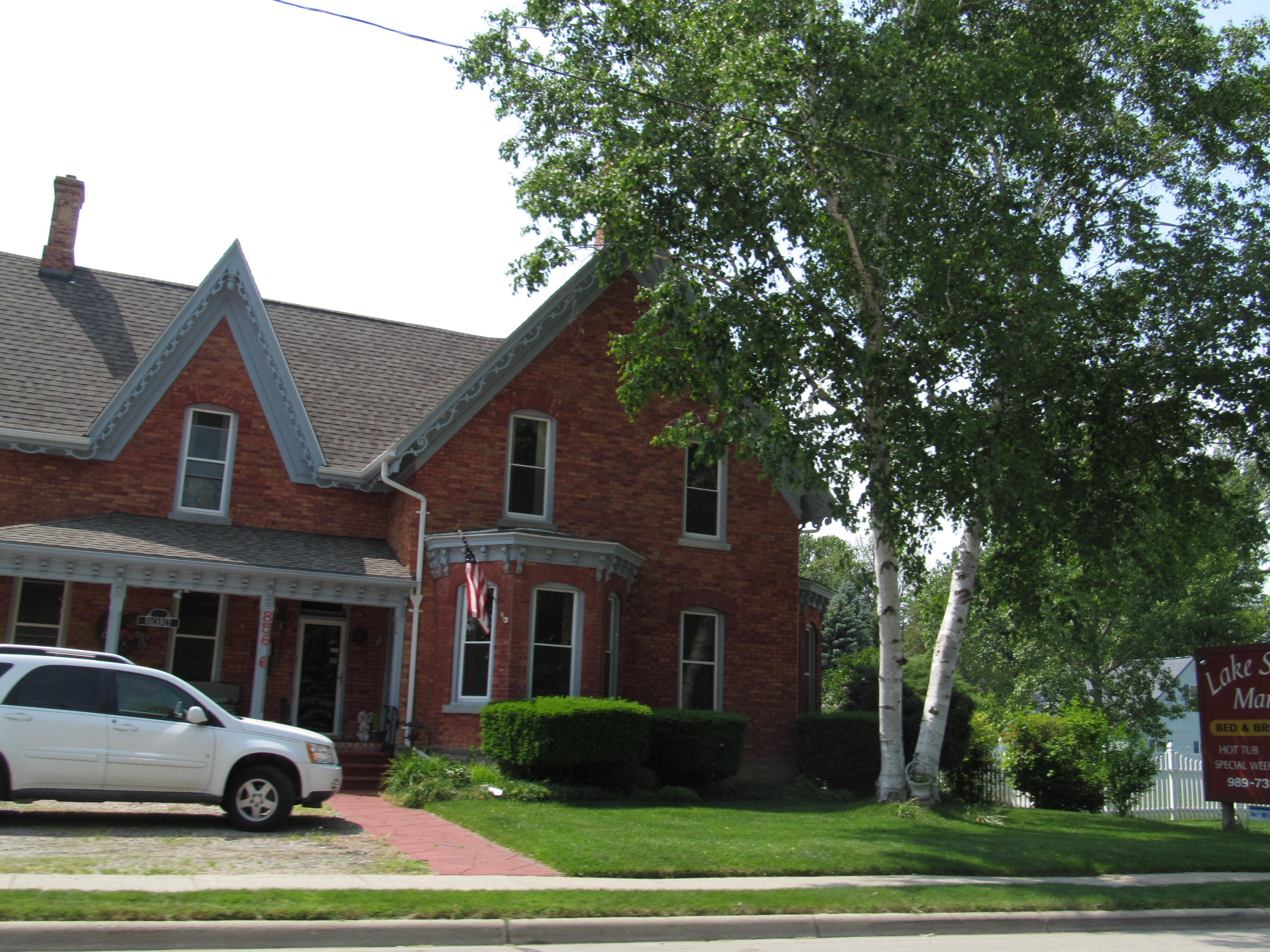

- Location within Michigan Location within the United States
- Interactive map showing the location for Smith-Cullhane House
- Location: 8569 Lake St., Port Austin, Michigan
- Coordinates: 44°2′35″N 82°59′41″W
- Area: less than one acre
- Built: 1871
- Architectural style: Late Victorian
- NRHP reference No.: 01001015
- Added to NRHP: September 24, 2001

The Smith-Culhane House is a private house located at 8569 Lake Street in Port Austin, Michigan. It was listed on the National Register of Historic Places in 2001. It was previously operated as a bed and breakfast, the Lake Street Manor, but was converted back to a private residence in 2021.

== History ==
Richard Smith was born in Roxburghshire, Scotland 1840 and immigrated to Peterborough, Ontario in 1857. He moved to Auburn, New York three years later, and then to Port Austin in 1865. Smith purchased a 120-acre parcel of land, and was elected Huron County Surveyor in 1866 and county register of deeds and clerk in 1868. In 1870 he purchased the plot of land on which this house sits, and likely built the house in about 1871. In 1873, the Huron County seat moved to Bad Axe, and Smith, still serving as register and clerk, moved with it. When his last term ended in 1877, he moved back to Port Austin. In 1883, he returned to Bad Axe, and sold this house to Cornelius Culhane in 1885.

Cornelius Culhane was born in Ireland in 1842, and moved to the United States as a young man. By 1871 he had moved to Port Austin, married Ellen Kennedy, and purchased farmland, but was soon working as a logger, running a logging outfit that contracted to sawmills to cut over timber lands. By the mid-1880s, Culhane was logging near Higgins Lake with a crew of one hundred men, and by the 1890s he was working in the Upper Peninsula. He was killed in 1903 in a logging accident. The Culhanes apparently used this house as their home when they were not working a logging camp. Ellen Kennedy Culhane continued to live in the house until her death in 1923, after which their son William owned it until his death in 1930. The house remained in the possession of the Culhane family until 1938.

In 1985, Jack and Carolyn Greenwood purchased the house and opened it as a bed and breakfast. They closed their doors in 2021, and it is now a private residence owned by the Logans.

== Description ==
The Smith-Culhane House is a 1-1/2 story Late Victorian T-shaped house with reddish-orange brick walls and a high gable roof. The gables and eaves have curvilinear vine-like bargeboards. Windows are one-over-one units, and have brick segmental-arched caps, as do the two front entrances. Two brick-walled slant-sided bay windows push out from the main body of the house.
