= Indian Mission =

- U.S. National Register of Historic Places
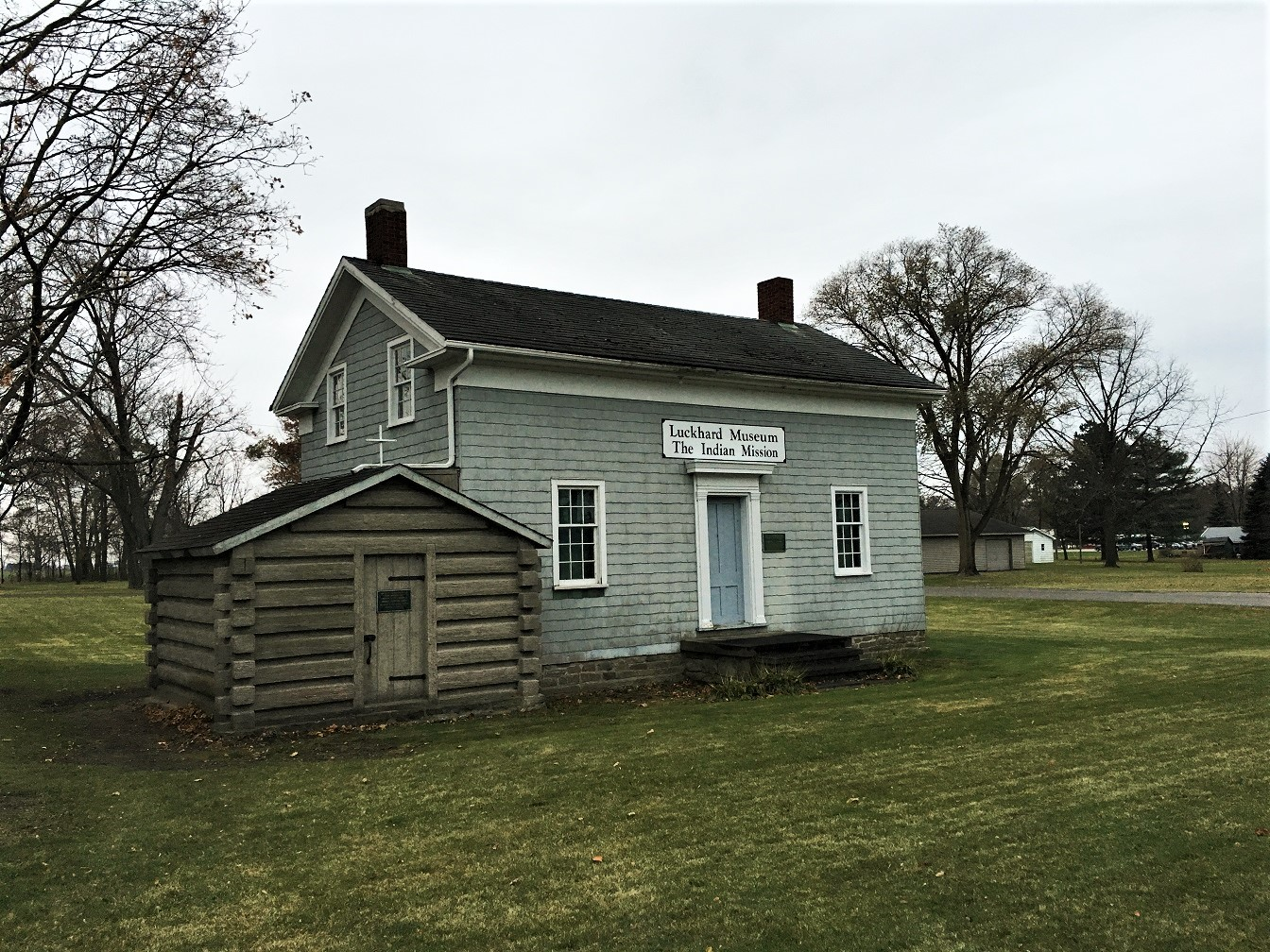

- Location within Michigan Location within the United States
- Interactive map
- Location: 590 E. Bay St. Sebewaing, Michigan
- Coordinates: 43°43′33″N 83°26′32″W
- Area: less than one acre
- Built: 1849
- Architect: John J. Auch
- NRHP reference No.: 72000620
- Added to NRHP: September 22, 1972

The Indian Mission, now the Luckhard Museum, is a historic Native American Christian mission located at 590 East Bay Street in Sebewaing, Michigan. It was built in 1849 and added to the National Register of Historic Places in 1972.

== History ==
John J. Auch was born in 1817 in Wurtemburg, Germany, and emigrated tho the United States with his parents in 1836. He studied theology, and in 1845 arrived in what is now Sebewaing as a missionary to the local Ojibwe tribe. Upon arrival, Auch constructed a log house at a site just north of Sebewaing. This proved inadequate, so in 1846 he purchased lumber from Bay City, ferried it to Sebewaing, and began constructing this mission house. The house was dedicated in 1849, and Auch used it as a combination mission and home for the next five years.

After Auch moved on, the building was alternately occupied and abandoned over the course of decades. In 1954, C.F. Luckhard purchased the building and extensively restored it. Luckhard moved the structure to its present location, and used it to display his collection of pioneer-era artifacts. Luckhard also constructed a replica of the first log house build by Auch near the mission.

== Description ==
The Indian Mission is a 1 1/2-story rectangular frame building with a gabled roof on a low stone foundation. The building has box cornices and two brick chimneys within the walls. The windows are double-hung sash units, six over six. Adjoining the mission is a concrete structure, cast in the shape of a log building, as a replica of the first chapel built in Sebewaing in 1845.
