= Charles G. Learned House =

Historic building in Michigan, U.S.

- U.S. National Register of Historic Places
- Michigan State Historic Site
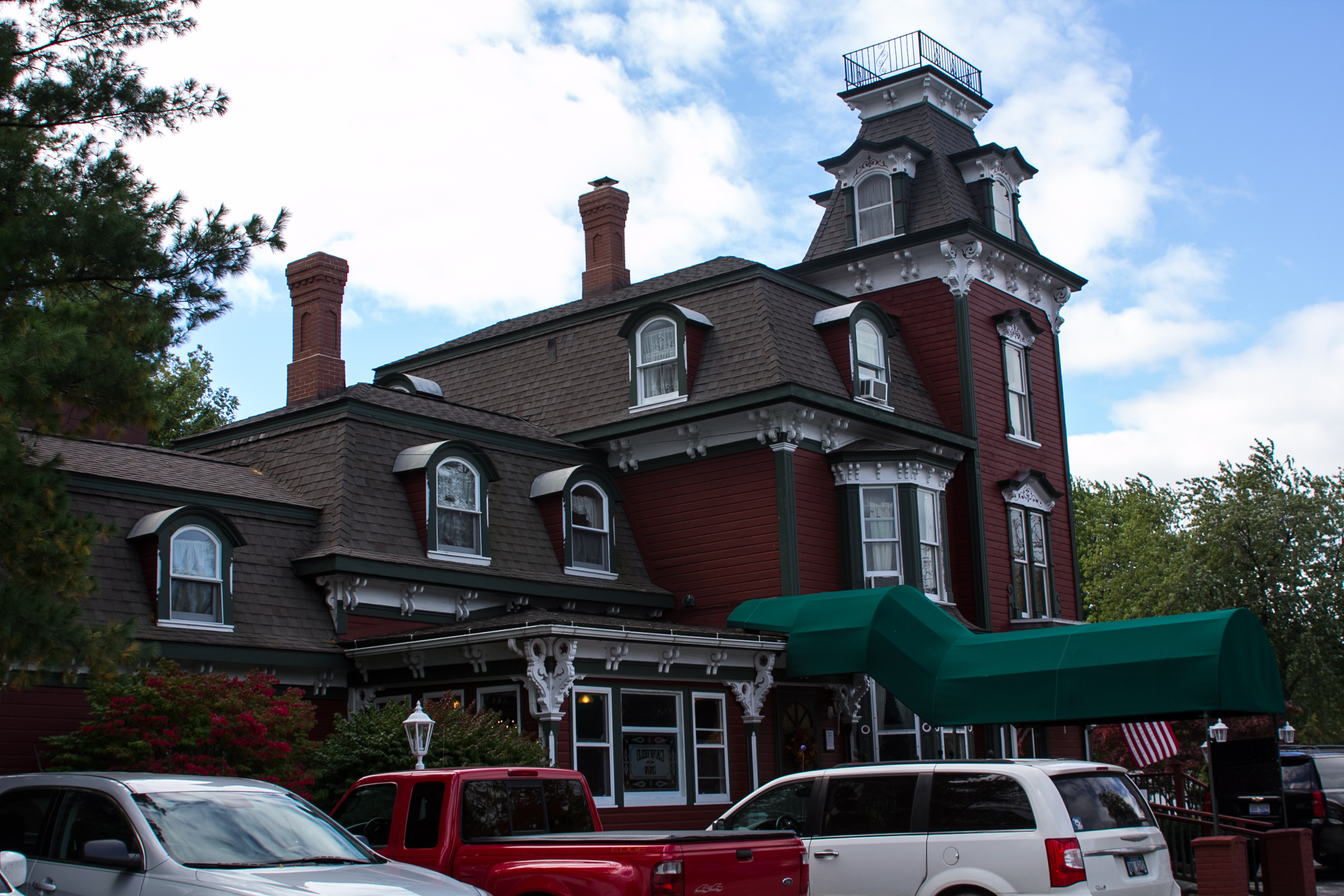

- Location within Michigan Location within the United States
- Interactive map showing the location for Charles G. Learned House
- Location: 8544 Lake St., Port Austin, Michigan
- Coordinates: 44°2′32″N 82°59′38″W
- Area: 1.8 acres (0.73 ha)
- Built: 1837
- Architectural style: Second Empire, Italianate
- NRHP reference No.: 84001400
- Added to NRHP: May 31, 1984

The Charles G. Learned House was built as a private house located at 8544 Lake Street in Port Austin, Michigan. It was listed on the National Register of Historic Places in 1984. It is now a bed and breakfast known as the Garfield Inn, named after US President James A. Garfield, a family friend of the Learneds and frequent guest.

== History ==
Charles G. Learned was born in 1816 in West Troy, New York. His father was a successful public works contractor, and in 1835 Charles won a contract under his father's name to build one mile of aqueduct for the City of New York. He married Maria Raymond in 1838 and continued to work on major public works contracts in New York and the surrounding states. Learned also established himself in both farming and lumbering in West Troy. During this time, he and his family met their lifelong family friend, future president James A. Garfield. Garfield was then a student, and made his home with the family between college terms.

By the late 1850s, Learned became interested in the Michigan frontier, particularly in lumbering. In 1859, he consolidated, sold, or leased all of his business holdings in New York State, began new business ventures in Michigan, and moved to Port Austin with his family. Once in Port Austin, Learned acquired this property, which already had a dwelling located on it. The origin and ownership of the dwelling are unknown, but it was likely built some time between 1837 and Learned's arrival in 1859. Learned constructed an addition, doubling the area of the house. Learned quickly became involved in extensive business interests in the area, trading in general merchandise, sinking a salt well, and opening saw mill, a shingle mill and barrel factory, and a flour mill. In about 1866, the couple constructed a large addition onto the house. At about this time, Garfield, then in the US Senate, visited the Learneds, and was, in fact, a frequent guest throughout the 1860s.

In 1870, Jonas Learned, Charles and Maria's only son, moved into the Port Austin house. He had been involved in lumber manufacturing and a successful mercantile enterprise in Port Crescent for some time, but opted to join the thriving community of Port Austin. Meanwhile, Charles Learned shifted his interest to agricultural products, and in 1871 Charles and Jonas collaborated to add, over a series of years, a number of Second Empire architectural details to what had to that time been an Italianate house. In 1874, Jonas sold his other businesses and joined his father's agricultural firm.

Maria Learned died in 1881, and Charles followed in 1891. Jonas Learned and his family continued to live in the house until 1931, when it was sold to a local manufacturer, a Mr. Mayes. Mayes renamed the home the Mayes Inn, and operated it as a tourist home, bar, and restaurant. In 1946 it was purchased by a Mr. Neinaltowski, who changed the name to the Tower Hotel. In 1979, Edward and Diana Hilgendorf bought the Tower Hotel, but in 1982, they sold to Gail and Gary Regnier, who began an extensive restoration of the home. Glen Roth and Stephen Erickson purchased the historic house in 2016. Major updates and mechanical improvements were completed. A restaurant was operated from 2016-2019 and a high-end Bed and Breakfast was in operations until December 2021. It is currently a restaurant known as the Catbird at the Garfield Inn.

== Description ==
The Charles G. Learned House is a prominent three-and-a-half story structure with distinctive Second Empire styling, reflecting several generations of construction. It has a mansard roof and a large front tower, both af which were likely c. 1870s additions to an earlier Italianate house.
