= Winsor and Snover Bank Building =

- U.S. National Register of Historic Places
- Michigan State Historic Site
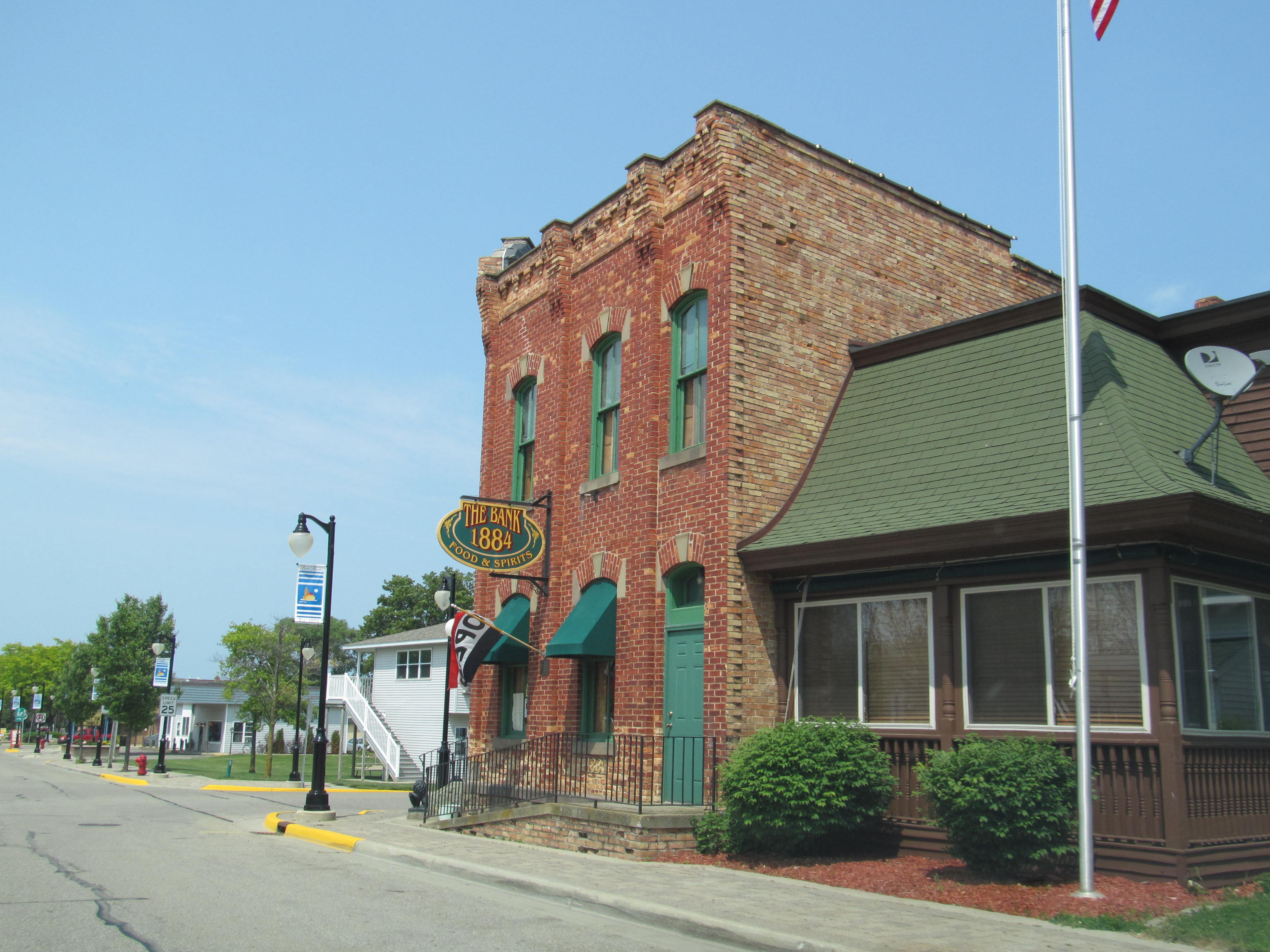
- Winsor and Snover Bank Building, 2013

- Location within Michigan Location within the United States
- Interactive map showing the location for Winsor and Snover Bank Building
- Location: 8648 Lake St., Port Austin, Michigan
- Coordinates: 44°2′40″N 82°59′38″W
- Area: less than one acre
- Built: 1884
- Architectural style: Gothic Revival
- NRHP reference No.: 87000482
- Added to NRHP: March 19, 1987

The Winsor and Snover Bank Building is a commercial structure located at 8648 Lake Street in Port Austin, Michigan. It was listed on the National Register of Historic Places in 1987. As of 2017, the building houses The Bank, 1884 restaurant.

== History ==
Richard Winsor was born in Ontario in 1839. His family moved to Michigan in 1856, but his father drowned on Lake Huron in 1860, leaving Richard as the provider for the family. Winsor bought and cleared land, and began the study of law. He was elected to the Michigan legislature in 1862 and 1864, and was accepted into the bar in 1867. He moved to Port Austin, and in 1868 was elected to the state Senate. in 1871, he formed a law partnership with Judge Robert W. Irwin.

Horace G. Snover was born in Romeo, Michigan in 1847. He attended the University of Michigan, graduating in 1872 with a law degree. In 1874, he moved to Port Austin and served as the principal of the local high school for two years. In 1876, he purchased Judge Irwin's interest in the law partnership with Richard Winsor, forming the firm of Windsor and Snover. After the disastrous Thumb Fire of 1881 which burned much of four counties in Michigan's thumb, Winsor and Snover began buying up local land (as much as 20,000 acres by 1884), developing part of it for their own agricultural purposes and selling the remainder to new settlers.

In 1884, Winsor and Snover moved into this new building, the first construction in Port Austin since the 1881 fire. They began operating their own bank out of the ground level of the building, with the legal firm operating out of the second floor. IN 1894, Snover bought out Winsor and took over the bank and the building. In 1918, it was purchased by a consortium headed by Albert E. Sleeper, and in 1957 the bank moved out of the building to another location in the community.

The local library used the building from 1957 to 1960, after which it was either used for storage or was entirely vacant until 1981. In that year, it was purchased Norman James Levey, who, with Anthony and Marilyn Berry, began renovating the building into a restaurant. The Bank, 1884 restaurant opened in 1984, and continues to operate out of the building.

== Description ==
The Winsor and Snover Bank Building is a two-story, red brick building with High Victorian Gothic Revival details, located on a corner lot. There are three entrances, including a main entrance at the corner, a second on the opposite end of the main facade, and the last on the opposite end of the side facade. Brick pilasters divide the two major facades into seven distinct bays, with three on each facade and the last in the corner. There are windows on both the first and second-floor levels. The windows are two-over-two, rounded-arch, double-hung sash units with a sill of stone and a lintel composed of three rows of header bricks.
