= William R. Stafford House =

- Stafford House
- U.S. National Register of Historic Places
- Michigan State Historic Site
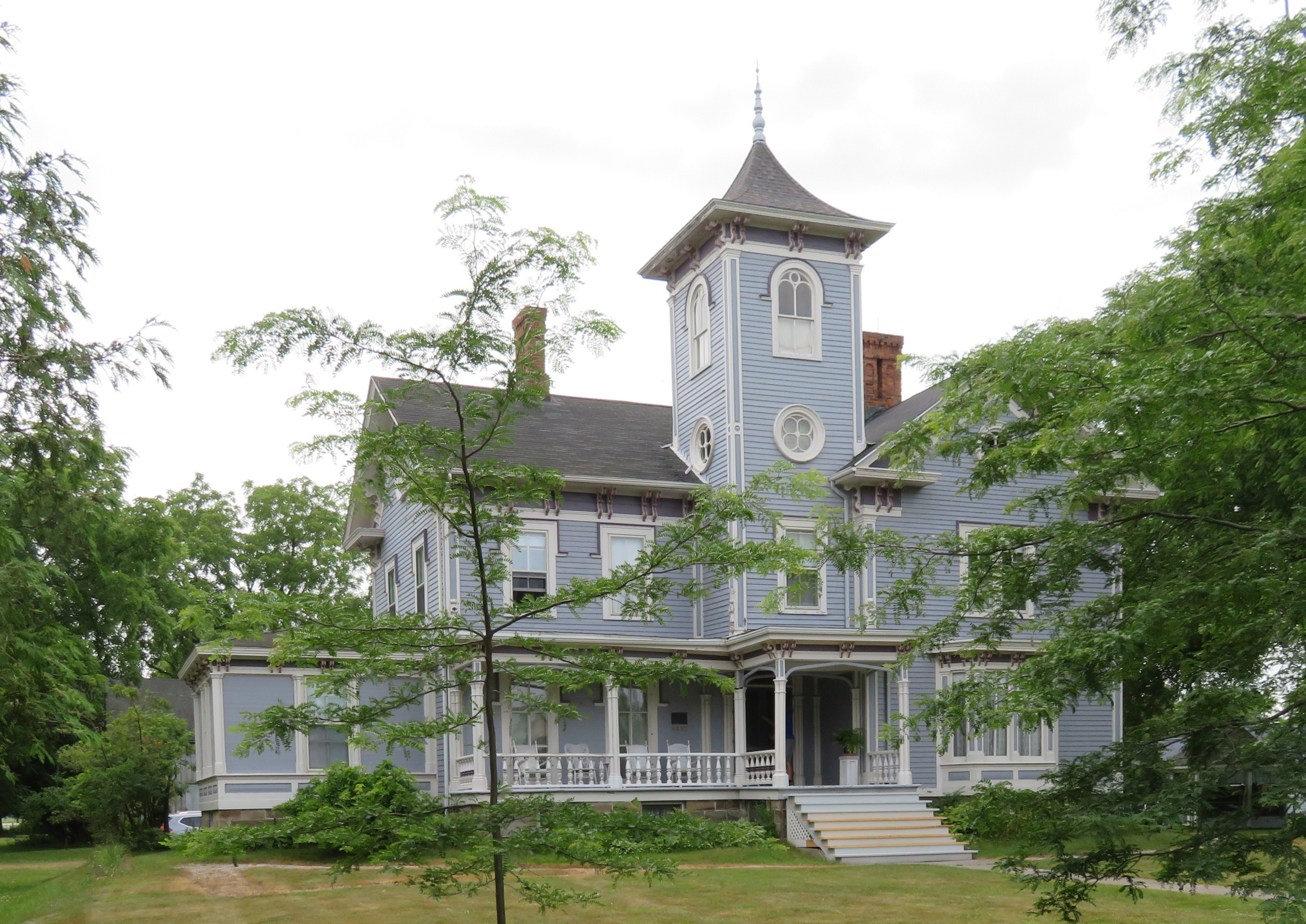
- House in 2018

- Location within Michigan Location within the United States
- Interactive map showing the location of William R. Stafford House
- Location: 4467 Main St., Port Hope, Michigan
- Coordinates: 43°56′28″N 82°42′53″W
- Area: 1 acre (0.40 ha)
- Built: 1866
- Architectural style: Italianate
- MPS: Port Hope MPS (AD)
- NRHP reference No.: 73000950
- Added to NRHP: January 25, 1973

The Stafford House is a historic home located at 4467 Main Street in Port Hope, Michigan. The House was listed on the National Register of Historic Places in 1973. The historic home was originally built for a prominent member of the Port Hope community, William R. Stafford.

== History ==
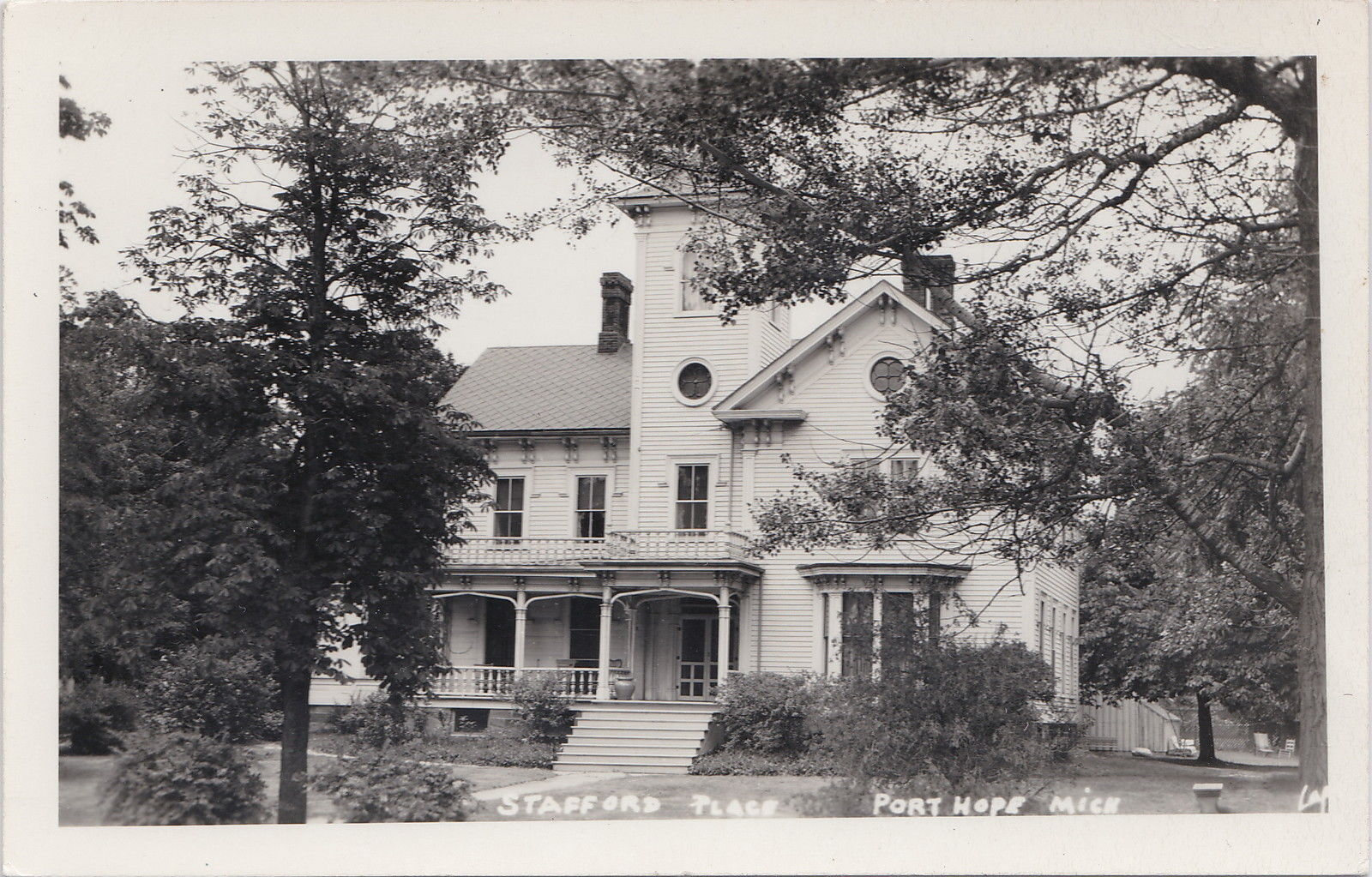
Stafford House in 1972

William R. Stafford was born in 1828 on a farm in Bath, New Hampshire. He apprenticed as a cabinet maker, and moved to Lexington, Michigan in 1849, gaining employment with Woods and Sanburn, general merchants. In 1853, he went into business for himself. He soon invested in the local lumber resources, and moved to what is now Port Hope in 1857, one of the first pioneers in the area. He bought or took out lumber claims on a great deal of the surrounding timberland. In 1858, a lumber mill was built and men moved into the area to work in the mill.

As the lumber business boomed, the town of Port Hope began to grow around the mill. Stafford also operated one of the largest and most complete salt blocks in the state, making his fortune shipping both salt and lumber. In 1866, Stafford began to construct this house in Port Hope. The house took two years to complete, and the Staffords moved in on Christmas Eve, 1868.

== Description ==
The Stafford House is a two-story Italianate structure with a three-story central cupola. The house has decorative cornices and architrave trim surrounding the double-hung sash windows. The front facade has a long porch running across and a bay window. The interior contains spacious rooms, including a parlor on the first floor and a child's room on the second.
