= Frank Murphy Birthplace =

Historic house in Michigan, United States

- U.S. National Register of Historic Places
- Michigan State Historic Site
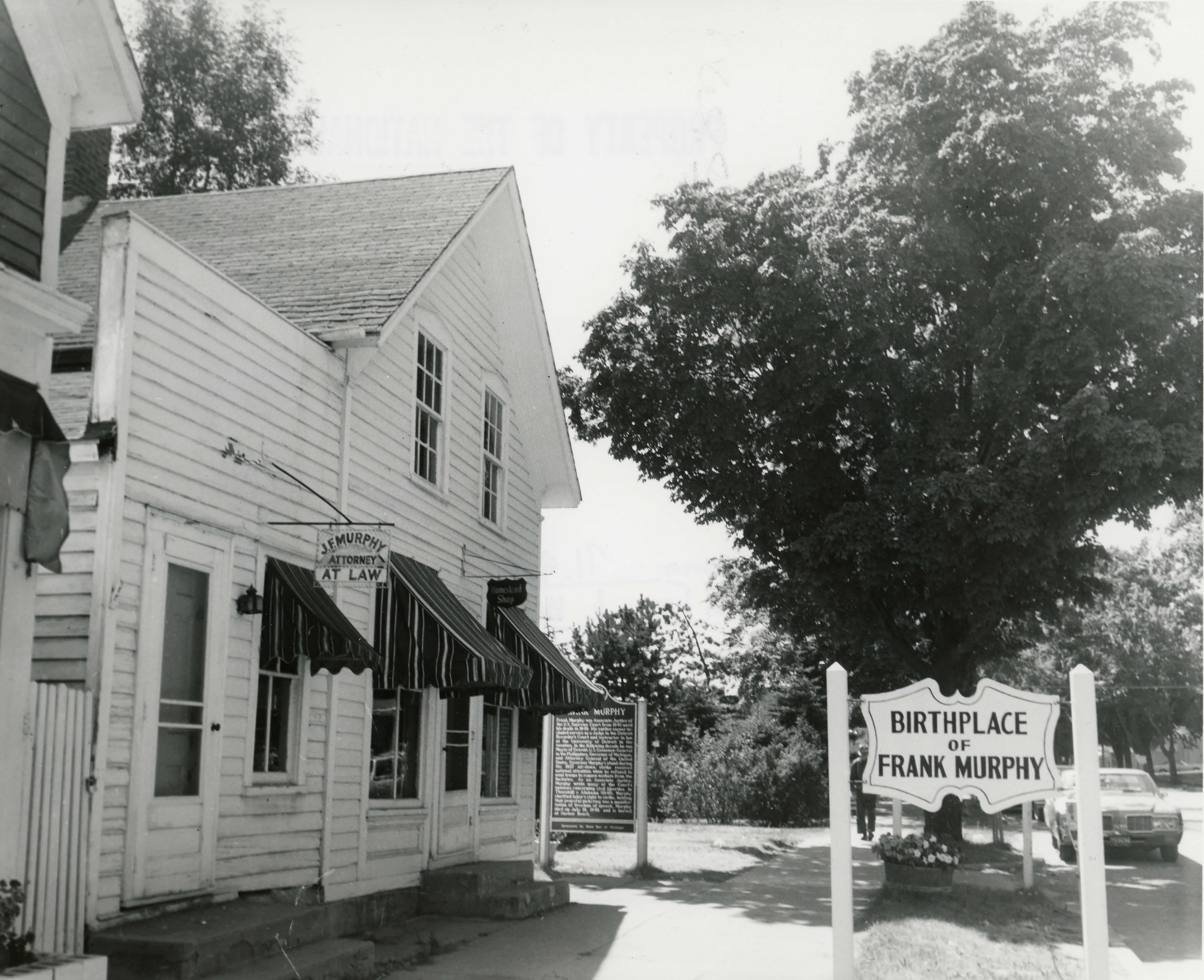
- Frank Murphy Birthplace, 1969
- Interactive map
- Location: 142 S. Huron St. Harbor Beach, Michigan
- Coordinates: 43°50′33″N 82°39′5″W
- Area: less than one acre
- NRHP reference No.: 71000394

Significant dates
- Added to NRHP: September 22, 1971
- Designated MSHS: February 17, 1967

The Frank Murphy Birthplace, located at 142 S. Huron St. in Harbor Beach, Michigan, is the birthplace of U.S. Supreme Court justice and Michigan governor Frank Murphy. The house was added to the National Register of Historic Places on September 22, 1971. The City of Harbor Beach operates the Frank Murphy Memorial Museum in the home.

== History ==
The Frank Murphy Birthplace house was built in the 1870s. The house was later owned by John F. Murphy, Frank's father, who used one wing of it as a law office. Frank Murphy was born in the home on April 13, 1890. The family later moved into a larger house next door, which is also part of the Frank Murphy Memorial Museum.

The Murphy family owned both houses until 1994, when the state of Michigan and the city of Harbor Beach put up money to purchase the property. The city obtained full ownership, and opened up the house as a museum. The museum is open for tours from Memorial Day to Labor Day.

== Description ==
The house is a 1 ½-story frame building with clapboard siding and a gable roof. The upper windows are double-hung, six-over-six units. A small, single-story wing is attached to the side, which was used as a law office by John F. Murphy, Frank's father. The interior has a simple four-room layout, and contains a number of furnishings originally owned by the Murphy family.
