= Albert E. Sleeper House =

- U.S. National Register of Historic Places
- Michigan State Historic Site
- Sleeper House

- Location within Michigan Location within the United States
- Interactive map
- Location: 302 W. Huron Ave., Bad Axe, Michigan
- Coordinates: 43°48′6″N 83°0′16″W
- Area: 1 acre (0.40 ha)
- Built: 1916
- Built by: Albert E. Sleeper
- Architectural style: Greek Revival
- NRHP reference No.: 72000619
- Added to NRHP: February 1, 1972

The Albert E. Sleeper House is a private house in Bad Axe, Michigan. It was listed on the National Register of Historic Places in 1972.

== History ==
Albert E. Sleeper was born in Vermont in 1862. He moved to Lexington, Michigan in 1884, and in 1904 relocated to Bad Axe. Sleeper served as a state senator from 1901 to 1904, as state treasurer from 1908 to 1912, and as governor from 1917 to 1920. Sleeper began work on this house in Bad Axe in 1916, finishing it in 1917. After finishing his term as governor, Sleeper returned to Bad Axe to run his banking and real estate businesses. He fell ill in 1932, withdrawing from his businesses, and died in 1934. His wife Mary continued to live in the house until 1954.

The Sleeper estate sold the house to William T. Collon in 1954. Collon ran the Collon-Colgan Funeral Home from the house until 1974, when the house was acquired by Henry and Barbara Weitenberner. The Weitenberners lived in the home and ran the Weitenberner Funeral Home from the home until 2006.

== Description ==
The Sleeper House is a 2 1/2-story Greek Revival structure sheathed with brick. A two-story portico supported with Doric columns fronts the building, and two wings are attached to the rear. All windows in the building are double-hung two-sash units, and the main central door is surmounted by a fanlight. Gabled dormers are on the roof.

The interior of the house contains hardwood parquet floors with unique geometric patterns. There is a large marble fireplace in the living room and a tiled fireplace in the library. The second floor is accessed via a sweeping Palladian staircase. Furnishings from the Sleeper estate are still in the house.
