= Port Hope, Michigan =

- Village
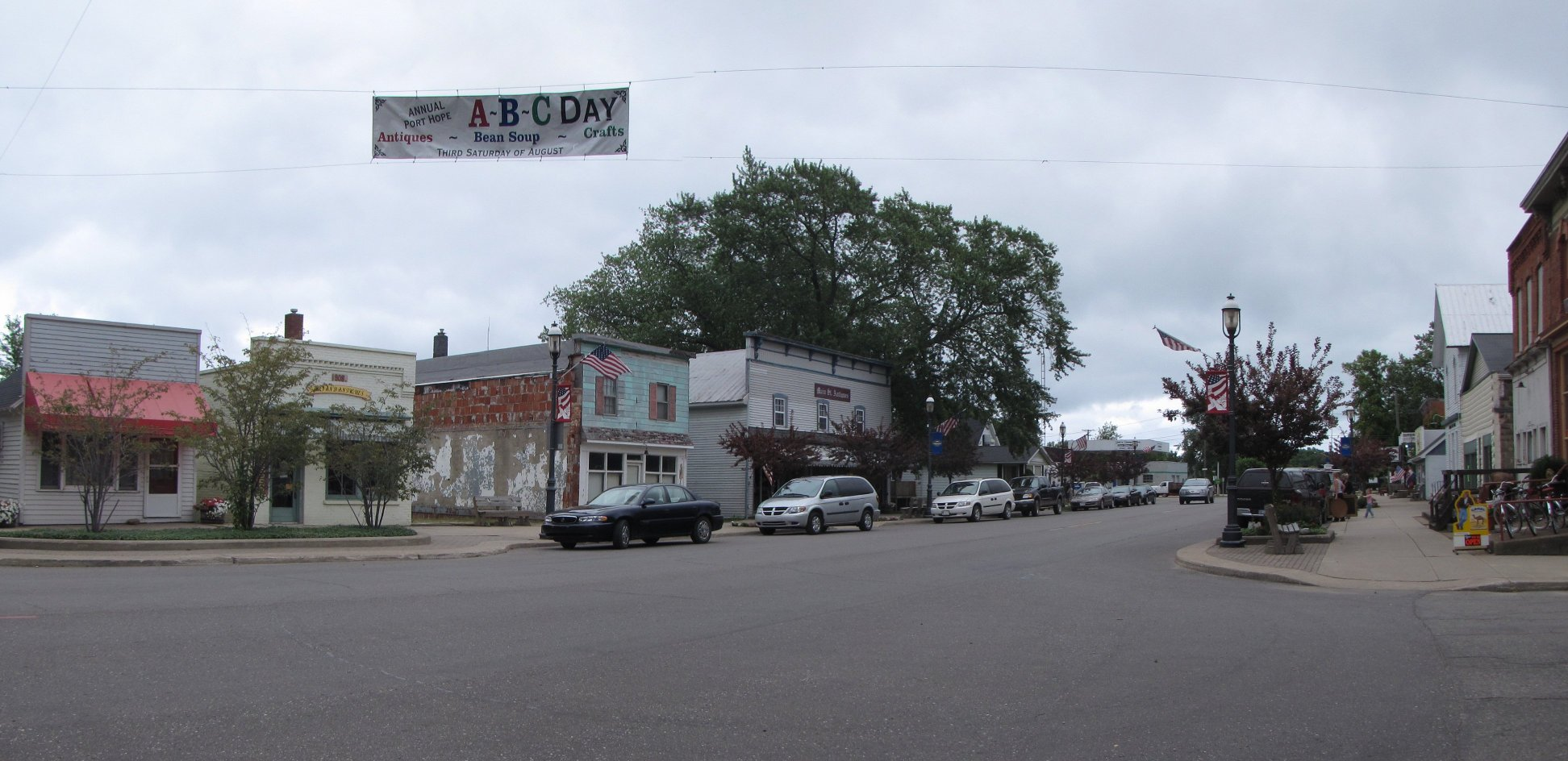
- Looking south along M-25 (Main Street)

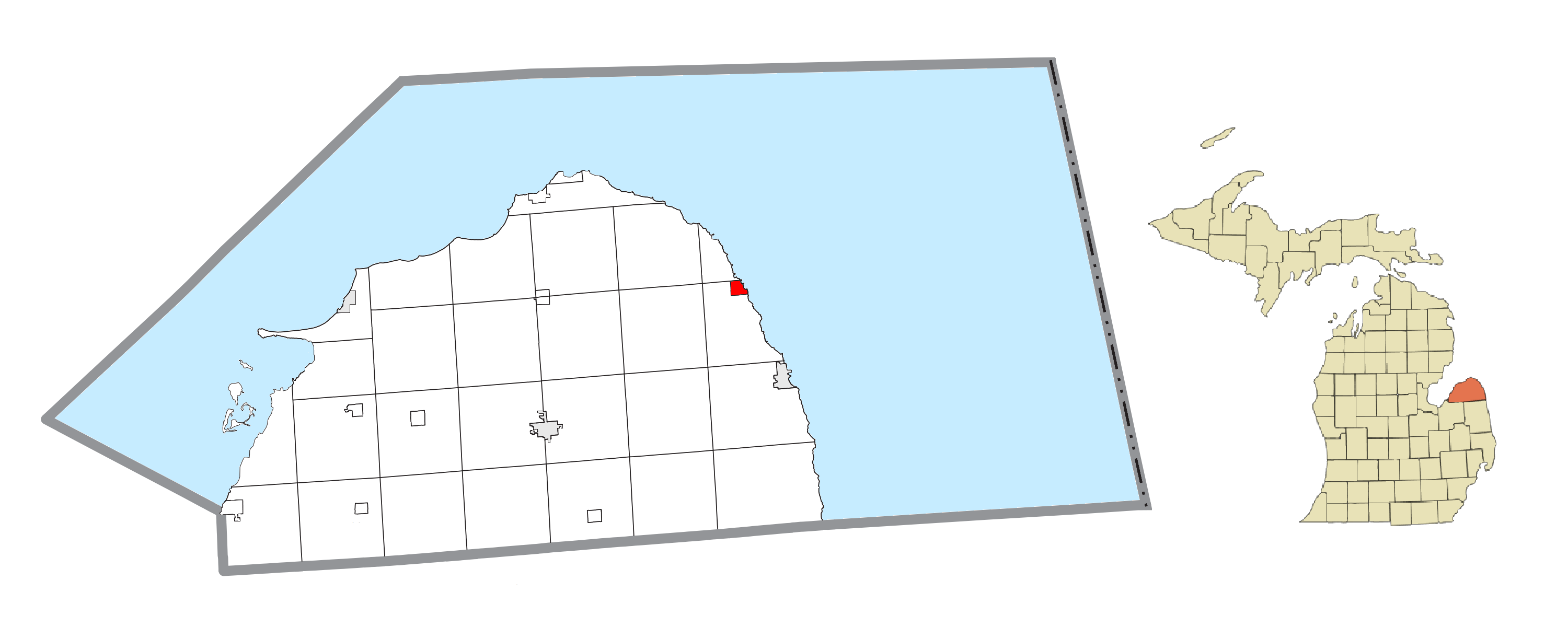
- Location within Huron County

- Location within the state of Michigan
- Coordinates: 43°56′27″N 82°42′49″W
- Country: United States
- State: Michigan
- County: Huron
- Township: Rubicon
- Established: 1887

Government
  - Type: Village council

Area
  - Total: 1.01 sq mi (2.62 km^{2})
  - Land: 1.01 sq mi (2.62 km^{2})
  - Water: 0 sq mi (0.00 km^{2})
- Elevation: 607 ft (185 m)

Population (2020)
  - Total: 293
  - Density: 289.7/sq mi (111.85/km^{2})
- Time zone: UTC-5 (Eastern (EST))
  - Summer (DST): UTC-4 (EDT)
- ZIP code(s): 48468
- Area code: 989
- FIPS code: 26-65800
- GNIS feature ID: 0635265
- Website: Official website

Port Hope is a village in Huron County of the U.S. state of Michigan. As of the 2020 census, Port Hope had a population of 293. The village is within Rubicon Township.

== Geography ==
According to the United States Census Bureau, the village has a total area of 1.01 square miles (2.62 km^{2}), all land.

== Demographics ==
Historical population
Census	Pop.	Note	%±
1890	398		—
1900	319		−19.8%
1910	344		7.8%
1920	353		2.6%
1930	298		−15.6%
1940	313		5.0%
1950	353		12.8%
1960	349		−1.1%
1970	377		8.0%
1980	369		−2.1%
1990	313		−15.2%
2000	310		−1.0%
2010	267		−13.9%
2020	293		9.7%
U.S. Decennial Census

=== 2010 census ===
As of the census of 2010, there were 267 people, 133 households, and 80 families living in the village. The population density was 264.4 inhabitants per square mile (102.1/km^{2}). There were 201 housing units at an average density of 199.0 per square mile (76.8/km^{2}). The racial makeup of the village was 93.3% White, 1.9% Native American, and 4.9% from two or more races. Hispanic or Latino of any race were 2.2% of the population.

There were 133 households, of which 16.5% had children under the age of 18 living with them, 48.9% were married couples living together, 8.3% had a female householder with no husband present, 3.0% had a male householder with no wife present, and 39.8% were non-families. 36.1% of all households were made up of individuals, and 24% had someone living alone who was 65 years of age or older. The average household size was 2.01 and the average family size was 2.58.

The median age in the village was 54.9 years. 15.7% of residents were under the age of 18; 6% were between the ages of 18 and 24; 14.6% were from 25 to 44; 29.3% were from 45 to 64; and 34.5% were 65 years of age or older. The gender makeup of the village was 49.8% male and 50.2% female.

=== 2000 census ===
As of the census of 2000, there were 310 people, 132 households, and 95 families living in the village. The population density was 308.7 inhabitants per square mile (119.2/km^{2}). There were 203 housing units at an average density of 202.2 per square mile (78.1/km^{2}). The racial makeup of the village was 98.71% White and 1.29% Native American. Hispanic or Latino of any race were 0.32% of the population.

There were 132 households, out of which 24.2% had children under the age of 18 living with them, 61.4% were married couples living together, 7.6% had a female householder with no husband present, and 28.0% were non-families. 25.8% of all households were made up of individuals, and 17.4% had someone living alone who was 65 years of age or older. The average household size was 2.32 and the average family size was 2.67.

In the village, the population was spread out, with 20.0% under the age of 18, 5.5% from 18 to 24, 20.3% from 25 to 44, 26.1% from 45 to 64, and 28.1% who were 65 years of age or older. The median age was 48 years. For every 100 females, there were 96.2 males. For every 100 females age 18 and over, there were 101.6 males.

The median income for a household in the village was $31,071, and the median income for a family was $34,167. Males had a median income of $26,875 versus $18,125 for females. The per capita income for the village was $16,428. About 5.6% of families and 4.6% of the population were below the poverty line, including none of those under age 18 and 6.0% of those age 65 or over.

== Education ==
Port Hope Schools, which had been in operation since 1925, closed its doors in the spring of 2015. Port Hope students in grades 6–12 now get their education in Kinde, as the local school board voted in 2014 to contract educational services from North Huron Schools.

== History ==
In 1851, William Stafford, while living in Lexington, bought the first parcel of land in what is now Port Hope, with Reuben Dimond. Later, Stafford and William Southard invested in buying up forty-acre parcels from the government. These parcels had been set aside as pensions for veterans of the War of 1812. Traveling to the area by schooner, Southard was let off at some distance from shore, due to a pending storm. Rowing in a skiff in the wind, he vowed that if he made it to shore, he would name the spot Port Hope.

Stafford, along with others, opened up the area to lumbering and by 1858 his company dock was constructed and mills were in operation. The chimney from one of those mills can be seen and is the last standing chimney in Michigan from the lumbering era.

Port Hope survived the 1871 fire and was able to return to lumbering, but after the second fire in 1881 the trees were gone, and farming became the focus. Stafford adjusted and built a flour mill, elevator and a new dock.

Port Hope was incorporated in 1887, with the railroad coming in 1903. A walking tour brochure, with some of the 11 historic sites listed on the National Register of Historic Places, is available for visitors.

== Recreation ==
Stafford County Park is the site of softball tournaments and recreation activities throughout the summer, the 38-acre park also offers all the campground conveniences. A national historic site, the Sawmill chimney erected in 1858 graces the waterfront adjacent to a large enclosed pavilion. Features 73 sites and six camper cabins on 38 acres. Modern, tent and group camping. Features electricity, running water, and flush toilets. Showers and a sanitary station, boat launch, picnic grounds, shelters, swimming, playground and fishing. The park is open May 1 through October 15.
