= M-25 (Michigan highway) =

State highway in Michigan, United States

M-25
- M-25 highlighted in red

Route information
- Maintained by MDOT
- Length: 147.638 mi (237.600 km)
- Existed: 1933–present
- Tourist routes: Lake Huron Circle Tour; Center Avenue Heritage Route

Major junctions
- South end: BL I-69 / BL I-94 at Port Huron
- M-90 at Lexington; M-46 at Port Sanilac; M-142 at Harbor Beach; M-53 at Port Austin; M-142 at Bay Port; M-24 at Unionville; M-15 near Bay City
- West end: I-75 / BS I-75 / US 10 / US 23 at Bay City

Location
- Country: United States
- State: Michigan
- Counties: St. Clair, Sanilac, Huron, Tuscola, Bay

Highway system
- Michigan State Trunkline Highway System; Interstate; US; State; Byways
← US 25	→ M-26

M-25 is a state trunkline highway in the US state of Michigan. The route follows an arc-like shape closely along the Lake Huron shore of the Thumb in the eastern Lower Peninsula between Port Huron and Bay City. It serves the lakeshore resorts along Lake Huron and Saginaw Bay and generally lies within sight of the lake and the bay. All is surface road and generally scenic, except for the freeway segment near the junction with Interstate 75 (I-75) and connection into the US Highway 10 (US 10) freeway.

Between Port Huron and Port Austin it is the north–south highway was formerly US 25 before the designation was removed. Between Port Austin and Bay City it is an east–west route that appeared on some maps as US 25 and on some maps as M-25. Since the 1970s, when all of US 25 was deleted north of Cincinnati, Ohio, it is entirely signed as M-25.

== Route description ==
=== North to Port Austin ===
The starting point of M-25 at a junction with Business Loop I-69/Business Loop I-94 (BL I-69/BL I-94) in Port Huron. M-25 is part of the Lake Huron Circle Tour for its entire length, except the freeway segment in Bay City. From here M-25 heads north on Pine Grove Avenue until meeting M-136. At this intersection, M-25 turns north on 24th Avenue to Lakeshore Road then runs parallel to the Lake Huron shoreline.

In the community of Lakeport, M-25 passes through Lakeport State Park. Past the park, M-25 changes names from Lakeshore Road to Kimball Road temporarily. M-25 intersects the east end of M-90 blocks from Lake Huron in Lexington. There are public beaches in Lexington and in Port Sanilac. M-25's street name changes after the M-46 intersection to that of North Lakeshore Road. The Huron Shores Golf Club is located off the highway north of Port Sanilac at the intersection of Snover Road. Sanilac County has established the Sanilac County Park at the intersection of Downington Road and M-25 south of Richmondville. North of Forestville M-25 is once again called South Lakeshore Road as the highway crosses into Huron County.

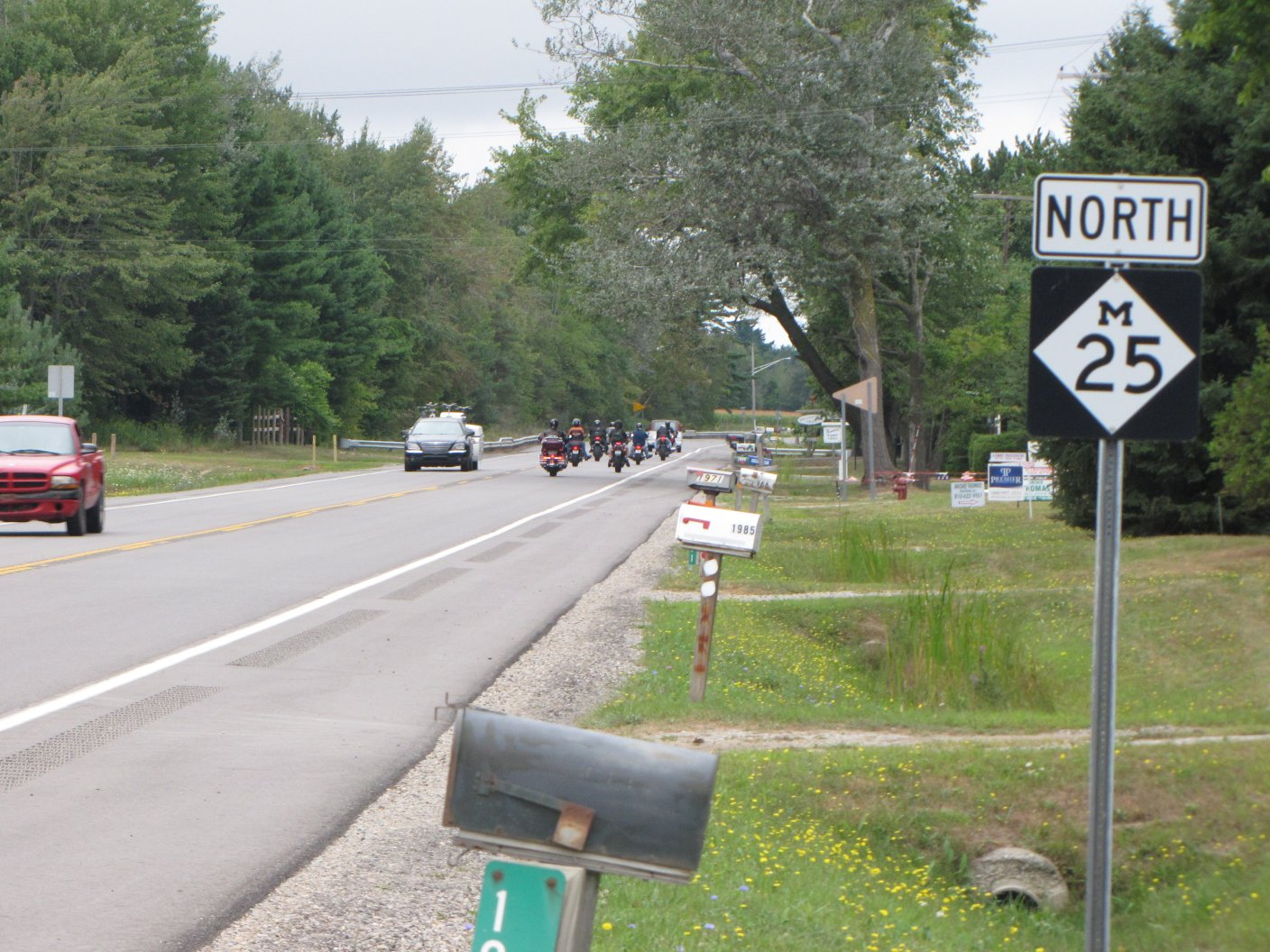
An M-25 north reassurance marker

Wagener County Park is located off M-25 in the community of Helena. M-25 begins to curve to the northwest in Sand Beach near the Rock Falls Cemetery. In the city of Harbor Beach, M-25 is called Huron Avenue and meets M-142 for the first of two occasions. Here is the Harbor Beach Golf Course on the south side of town as M-25 moves inland through town. North of town, the trunkline parallels an old routing of the Chesapeake & Ohio Railway as it is once again renamed Lakeshore Road. The highway moves farther inland north of Rubicon and Port Hope as it begins to round the tip of the Thumb. In Grindstone City, M-25 loses the Lakeshore Road name in favor of Grindstone Road all the way to Port Austin.

=== West to Bay City ===
Port Austin is the location of the historical northern terminus of US 25. Through town, M-25 turns north along Lake Street and runs concurrently with the northern end of M-53. The highway turns westward on Port Austin Road along the lake where M-53 terminates; this is also the point where the M-25 signage changes from northbound to westbound. West of town, M-25 turns south along the Saginaw Bay and meets Port Crescent State Park. From here south west, M-25 hugs the bay and its miles of beaches. North of Caseville is the Albert E. Sleeper State Park. Through Caseville, M-25 uses Main Street and passes the city beach off State Street. McKinley is home to the Scenic Golf & Country Club and Wild Fowl Bay. M-25 follows the shore of Wild Fowl Bay, a smaller bay off Saginaw Bay, to the city of Bay Port and the western terminus of M-142 on Fairhaven a smaller community south of Bay Port. From here south, the road is called Unionville Road and turns inland to Sebewaing.

At Unionville, M-25 turns more westerly to round the bottom of Saginaw Bay into Bay City along Bay City-Forestville Road in Tuscola County. In the community of Quanicassee, it transitions to Center Road and crosses into Bay County. M-25 is routed the one-way street pair of 7th Street and McKinley Street before crossing the Veterans Memorial Bridge over the Saginaw River. West of the bridge, the one-way pairing of Jenny Street and Thomas Street are used before the two merge into Thomas Street west of the M-13 intersections, where the LHCT departs.

The western terminus is at the junction of I-75/US 23 and US 10. As the roadway crosses the I-75/US 23 freeway it feeds into the eastern end of US 10 freeway.

== History ==
=== Previous designation ===
The M-25 designation was first used by July 1, 1919. in the Upper Peninsula. The highway ran from Skandia along what is today M-94 to Munising. From there it used today's routing of M-28 eastward to Newberry and Sault Ste. Marie. This designation was replaced by M-28 in 1927.

=== Current designation ===
In 1933, US 25 was extended north from Port Huron to Port Austin along M-29. M-25 was designated along the portion of M-29 disconnected by the US 25 extension, from Bay City to Port Austin. M-25 was extended along US 25 to Port Huron when the latter was removed from Michigan in 1973. The southern terminus was placed at I-94 in Marysville, Michigan until it was moved northward to end at BL I-94 (now BL I-69/BL I-94) in 1987.

The section of M-25 in the City of Bay City was named what is now called a Pure Michigan Historic Byway by the Michigan Department of Transportation (MDOT). This designation was created on October 23, 1997, for the section of M-25 along Center Avenue between Madison Avenue and the eastern city limits. Originally called the Bay City Historic Heritage Route", it has been called the Center Avenue Heritage Route by its local stewardship committee.

== Major intersections ==
County	Location	mi	km	Destinations	Notes
St. Clair	Port Huron	0.000	0.000	BL I-69 / BL I-94 (Hancock Street)	
St. Clair	Port Huron	0.288– 0.355	0.463– 0.571	To I-69 west / I-94 west / LHCT south – Bridge to Canada	Southern end of LHCT concurrency
St. Clair	Port Huron	1.593	2.564	M-136 west (Pine Grove Avenue)	Eastern terminus of M-136
Sanilac	Lexington	17.083	27.492	M-90 west (Huron Avenue) – Croswell	Eastern terminus of M-90
Sanilac	Port Sanilac	28.449	45.784	M-46 west (Main Street) – Sandusky	Eastern terminus of M-46
Huron	Harbor Beach	57.980	93.310	M-142 west (State Street) – Bad Axe	Eastern terminus of M-142
Huron	Port Austin	82.606	132.941	M-53 south (Lake Street) – Bad Axe	Southern end of M-53 concurrency
Huron	Port Austin	82.944	133.485	M-53 south (Lake Street)	Northern end of M-53 concurrency; northern terminus of M-53; historic northern terminus of US 25; signage changes between north–south and east–west
Huron	Fairhaven Township	111.566	179.548	M-142 east (Pigeon Road) – Bad Axe	Western terminus of M-142
Tuscola	Unionville	121.635	195.753	M-24 south (Center Street) – Caro	Northern terminus of M-24
Bay	Bay City	143.382	230.751	M-15 south (Trumbull Street)	Northern terminus of M-15
Bay	Bay City	144.536	232.608	M-84 south (Washington Avenue) BS I-75 west	Eastern end of BS I-75 concurrency; northern terminus of M-84; eastern terminus of BS I-75
Bay	Bay City	144.765	232.977	Mechelen Drive	Former eastbound exit and entrance; Mechelen Drive obliterated, former eastbound exit retained as connection to Uptown Drive
Bay	Bay City	145.049	233.434	John F. Kennedy Drive	Westbound exit only
Bay	Bay City	145.948	234.881	M-13 / LHCT (Euclid Avenue)	Northern end of LHCT concurrency
Bay	Bangor Township	146.332	235.499	Eastern end of freeway	
Bay	Monitor Township	147.624– 147.638	237.578– 237.600	I-75 / US 23 – Saginaw, Mackinac Bridge BS I-75 east US 10 west – Midland, Clare	Western terminus of M-25/BS I-75 and eastern terminus of US 10; road continues westward as US 10; exit 162 on I-75/US 23 and exit 140 on US 10
1.000 mi = 1.609 km; 1.000 km = 0.621 mi: Closed/former; Concurrency terminus; Incomplete access
