= Sebewaing =

Sebewaing can refer to a location in the United States:

- Sebewaing Township, Michigan
- Sebewaing, Michigan, a village within the township
- Sebewaing River, in Michigan
