= Kilmanagh =

Kilmanagh may refer to:

- Kilnamanagh Lower, Ireland
- Kilnamanagh Upper, Ireland
- Kilmanagh, Ontario, Canada
- Kilmanagh, Michigan, USA
