= Sanford Brown (politician) =

American politician

Sanford A. Brown
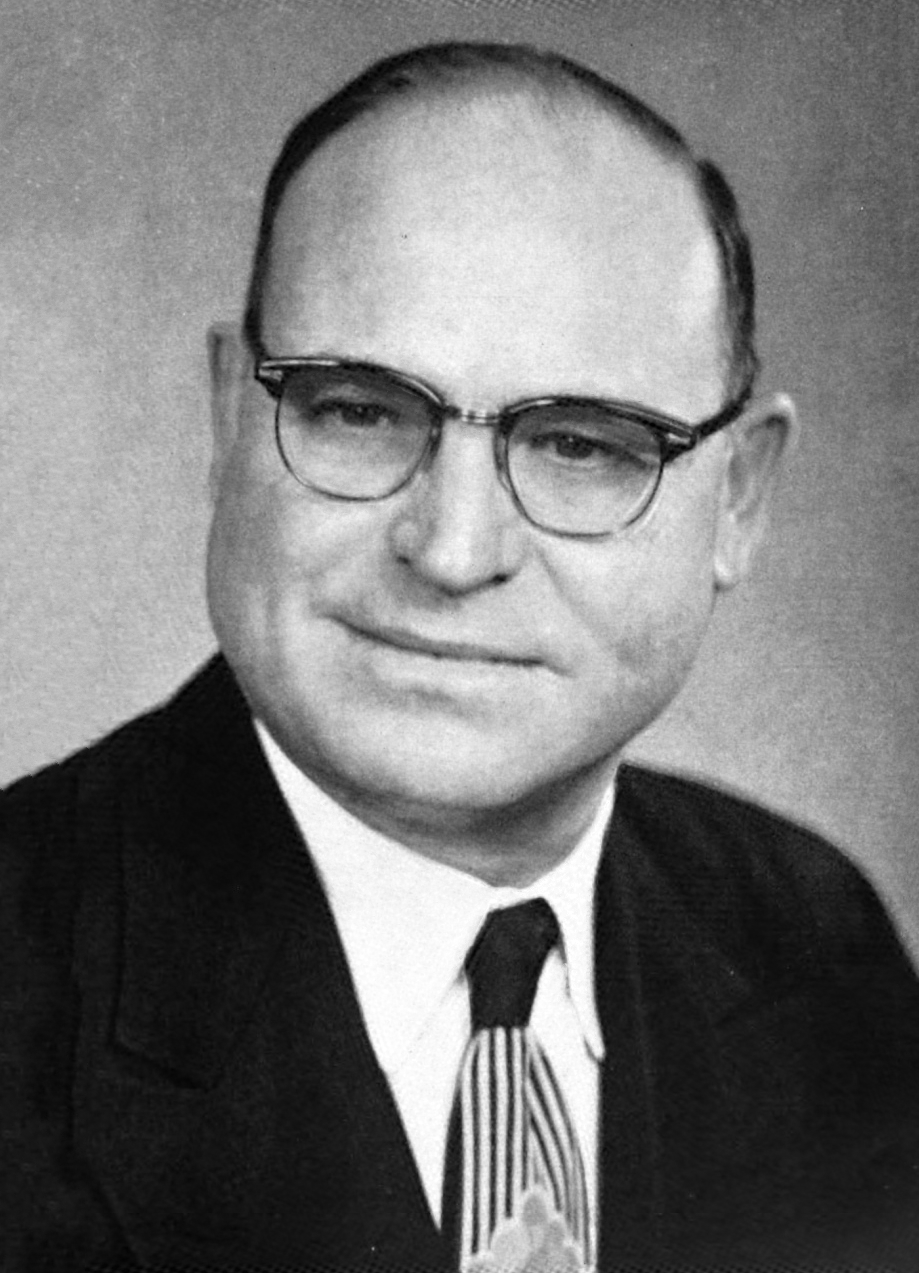

Treasurer of Michigan
- In office 1955–1965
- Governor: G. Mennen Williams; John Swainson; George W. Romney
- Preceded by: D. Hale Brake
- Succeeded by: Allison Green

Personal details
- Born: May 18, 1909 Bay Port, Michigan, US
- Died: June 26, 1986 (aged 77) Bay City, Michigan, US
- Party: Democratic
- Spouse: Mildred Maxine Harder
- Children: 2

Sanford A. Brown (May 18, 1909 – June 26, 1986) was a Michigan politician.

== Early life ==
Brown was born in Bay Port, Michigan, on May 18, 1909.

== Career ==
Brown served as Michigan State Treasurer from 1955 to 1965. Brown was the last Michigan State Treasurer to be elected, as the position was changed to an appointed one after his term in the office. In 1956 and 1964, Brown served as an alternate delegate to the Democratic National Convention from Michigan. In 1964, Brown ran unsuccessfully as for the United States House of Representatives seat representing the Michigan's 8th congressional district. In 1968, Brown ran unsuccessfully for the Michigan House of Representatives seat representing the 57th district.

== Personal life ==
Brown married Mildred Maxine Harder. Together they had two sons.

== Death ==
Brown died on June 26, 1986, in Bay City. Brown was interred at New Bay Port Cemetery in Fairhaven Township, Michigan.

Party political offices
| Preceded by William L. Johnson | Democratic nominee for Michigan State Treasurer; 1954, 1956, 1958, 1960, 1962 | Succeeded by None |
Political offices
| Preceded by D. Hale Brake | Treasurer of Michigan; 1955–1965 | Succeeded by Allison Green |
