= Unionville-Sebewaing Area High School =

Location
- 2203 Wildner Road; Sebewaing, Michigan 48759; United States; 43.6953°N 83.4614°W

Information
- School type: Public High school
- Founded: 1972
- Status: Still Open, Running Well
- School district: Unionville-Sebewaing Area School District
- Superintendent: Josh Hahn
- Principal: Chuck Arnold
- Teaching staff: 12.00 (FTE)
- Grades: 9–12
- Years offered: 4 Years
- Enrollment: 226 (2023–24)
- Student to teacher ratio: 23.20
- Colors: Red, white and blue
- Team name: Patriots
- Website: mshs.think-usa.org

Unionville-Sebewaing Area High School (USA High School) is a public high school located in Sebewaing, Michigan, United States. It was formed in 1972 when Unionville High School and Sebewaing High School merged.

The school has won 2 state football championships, seven girls' softball championships (2006, 2007, 2009, 2015, 2016, 2019 and 2021), and multiple state wrestling titles, among many other state championship appearances and high advancement in playoffs.

The school is also known for its technology program. USA School has received state and national awards for its academic and technology programs. USA School is a Professional Learning Community (PLC) School and is NCA High School.

== Notable alumni ==
- Heidi Androl (1998), sports reporter for the NHL and UFC

== See also ==
- Michigan Sugar Festival, a festival in Sebewaing, Michigan
