= M142 (disambiguation) =

M142 is the HIMARS light multiple rocket launcher.

M142 may also refer to:

- M-142 (Michigan highway)
- M142 firing device, commonly used in Booby traps
