= M-142 (Michigan highway) =

State highway in Huron County, Michigan, United States

M-142

Route information
- Maintained by MDOT
- Length: 39.186 mi (63.064 km)
- Existed: 1939–present

Major junctions
- West end: M-25 near Bay Port
- M-53 in Bad Axe; M-19 near Bad Axe
- East end: M-25 in Harbor Beach

Location
- Country: United States
- State: Michigan
- Counties: Huron

Highway system
- Michigan State Trunkline Highway System; Interstate; US; State; Byways
← US 141	→ M-143

M-142 is an east–west state trunkline highway in The Thumb region of the US state of Michigan. It is a "trans-peninsular" highway in that it travels through an agricultural area from Bay Port on Saginaw Bay to Harbor Beach on Lake Huron. The current trunkline in Huron County was originally parts of other state highways that date back to the initial 1919 signposting of the state highway system in the state. The designation was applied in 1939, and the road has remained unchanged since it was completely paved in the 1950s. One other highway, near Lake City, carried the number in the 1930s.

== Route description ==
M-142 begins just a few miles south of Bay Port at an intersection with M-25 near the Bay Port Cemetery, about two-thirds of a mile (1.1 km) inland from Saginaw Bay. From there, the road travels eastward through farm country on Pigeon Road. The highway follows a direct course over the Pigeon River to the village of Pigeon, when M-142 turns south on Main Street to exit town. South of town, the Pigeon Road name resumes, and after about one mile (1.6 km), M-142 turns back eastward near the Grand Lawn Cemetery. The road then continues eastward through more farms to Elkton, diverting off a direct course to cross a line of the Huron and Eastern Railway on the east side of town.

North of Bad Axe, M-142 leaves Pigeon Road to turn southward along Van Dyke Road for about mile and a half (2.4 km). Along this section, the highway runs concurrently with M-53 into town. At the intersection with Huron Avenue, M-142 turns east and M-53 turns west, ending the overlap of the two highways. M-142 exits town and follows Sand Beach Road through farm country. About three miles (4.8 km) of Bad Axe, M-142 meets the northern terminus of M-19 (Ubly Road). Continuing eastward, the highway crosses two branches of the Willow River as it passes through the unincorporated community of Verona. East of that location, the trunkline turns northeasterly, roughly parallel to the Rock Falls Creek, as it angles to Harbor Beach. M-142 follows State Street through town, and the trunkline terminates at the intersection with M-25 about a quarter mile (0.4 km) west of Lake Huron.

Like other state highways in Michigan, M-142 is maintained by the Michigan Department of Transportation (MDOT). In 2011, the department's traffic surveys showed that on average, 8,887 vehicles used the highway daily in the city of Bad Axe east of M-53 and 832 vehicles did so each day between M-25 and Pigeon, the highest and lowest counts along the highway, respectively. No section of M-142 is listed on the National Highway System, a network of roads important to the country's economy, defense, and mobility.

== History ==
=== Previous designation ===
The first highway to gain the M-142 moniker was designated by the end of 1929 running eastward from M-55/M-66 to a farm owned by Michigan State College (now Michigan State University) south of Lake City. By 1939, this one-mile (1.6 km) highway was transferred back to local control.

=== Current highway ===
When the state highway system was first signed in 1919, one of the original trunklines was numbered M-31, originally running northward from Port Huron to Harbor Beach and then westward to Saginaw. When the U.S. Highway System was approved on November 11, 1926, M-31 was decommissioned in favor of alternate numbers. The roadway between Bay Port and Harbor Beach was assigned the M-83 designation; Between Bay Port and Bad Axe, the highway was also a part of the contemporary M-29. By 1933, the M-29 designation was removed when that highway was realigned to follow the Saginaw Bay shoreline and later became parts of an extended US Highway 25 (US 25) and a new M-25.

In 1939, a section of M-83 was returned to local control, which would have resulted in a discontinuous routing. Segments of the trunkline were absorbed into other existing highways. The former routing of M-83 from Bay Port, eastward across The Thumb, to Harbor Beach where it met up with US 25 was redesignated M-142. By early 1952, the last section of the highway was paved, stretching about three miles (4.8 km) eastward from the M-19 junction Michigan State Highway Department (April 15, 1952). 1952 Official Highway Map (Map). The highway has been unchanged since.

== Major intersections ==
The entire highway is in Huron County.

Location	mi	km	Destinations	Notes
Fairhaven Township	0.000	0.000	M-25 / LHCT – Bay City, Port Austin	
Bad Axe	19.853	31.950	M-53 north (Van Dyke Road) – Port Austin	Western end of M-53 concurrency
Bad Axe	21.343	34.348	M-53 south (Huron Avenue) – Imlay City	Eastern end of M-53 concurrency
Verona Township	24.242	39.014	M-19 south – Sandusky	Northern terminus of M-19
Harbor Beach	39.186	63.064	M-25 / LHCT – Port Austin, Port Sanilac	
1.000 mi = 1.609 km; 1.000 km = 0.621 mi: Concurrency terminus
