= Owendale, Michigan =

- Village
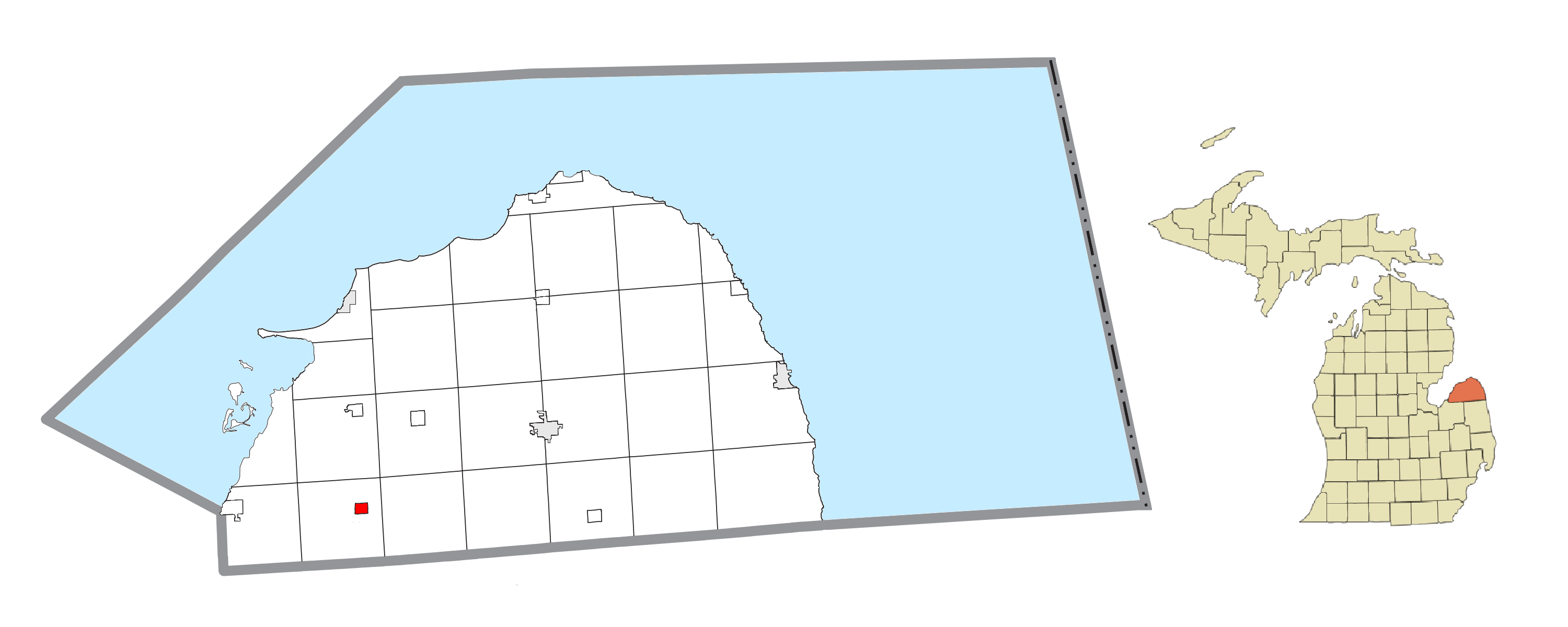
- Location within Huron County

- Location within the state of Michigan
- Coordinates: 43°43′40″N 83°16′07″W
- Country: United States
- State: Michigan
- County: Huron
- Township: Brookfield

Area
  - Total: 0.75 sq mi (1.93 km^{2})
  - Land: 0.75 sq mi (1.93 km^{2})
  - Water: 0 sq mi (0.00 km^{2})
- Elevation: 640 ft (195 m)

Population (2020)
  - Total: 275
  - Density: 369.9/sq mi (142.83/km^{2})
- Time zone: UTC-5 (Eastern (EST))
  - Summer (DST): UTC-4 (EDT)
- ZIP code(s): 48754
- Area code: 989
- FIPS code: 26-61920
- GNIS feature ID: 0634244

Owendale is a village in Huron County of the U.S. state of Michigan. As of the 2020 census, Owendale had a population of 275. The village is within Brookfield Township.

== Geography ==
According to the United States Census Bureau, the village has a total area of 0.74 square miles (1.92 km^{2}), all land.

== Education ==
It has one high school, in which it joins with neighboring town Gagetown. They comprise the Owen-Gage Bulldogs. They compete in The Mid-Michigan 8-man Football League/ILAC.

== Demographics ==
Historical population
Census	Pop.	Note	%±
1910	285		—
1920	274		−3.9%
1930	246		−10.2%
1940	296		20.3%
1950	307		3.7%
1960	298		−2.9%
1970	312		4.7%
1980	308		−1.3%
1990	285		−7.5%
2000	296		3.9%
2010	241		−18.6%
2020	275		14.1%
U.S. Decennial Census

=== 2010 census ===
As of the census of 2010, there were 241 people, 99 households, and 65 families living in the village. The population density was 325.7 inhabitants per square mile (125.8/km^{2}). There were 116 housing units at an average density of 156.8 per square mile (60.5/km^{2}). The racial makeup of the village was 96.3% White, 0.4% Native American, 0.4% from other races, and 2.9% from two or more races. Hispanic or Latino of any race were 2.9% of the population.

There were 99 households, of which 36.4% had children under the age of 18 living with them, 50.5% were married couples living together, 9.1% had a female householder with no husband present, 6.1% had a male householder with no wife present, and 34.3% were non-families. 32.3% of all households were made up of individuals, and 17.2% had someone living alone who was 65 years of age or older. The average household size was 2.43 and the average family size was 3.02.

The median age in the village was 35.5 years. 25.7% of residents were under the age of 18; 9.6% were between the ages of 18 and 24; 26.1% were from 25 to 44; 23.7% were from 45 to 64; and 14.9% were 65 years of age or older. The gender makeup of the village was 50.2% male and 49.8% female.

=== 2000 census ===
As of the census of 2000, there were 296 people, 101 households, and 68 families living in the village. The population density was 398.2 inhabitants per square mile (153.7/km^{2}). There were 114 housing units at an average density of 153.3 per square mile (59.2/km^{2}). The racial makeup of the village was 97.30% White, 0.68% Asian, and 2.03% from two or more races. Hispanic or Latino of any race were 11.49% of the population.

There were 101 households, out of which 39.6% had children under the age of 18 living with them, 50.5% were married couples living together, 10.9% had a female householder with no husband present, and 31.7% were non-families. 27.7% of all households were made up of individuals, and 13.9% had someone living alone who was 65 years of age or older. The average household size was 2.52 and the average family size was 3.13.

In the village, the population was spread out, with 29.1% under the age of 18, 11.5% from 18 to 24, 29.4% from 25 to 44, 17.2% from 45 to 64, and 12.8% who were 65 years of age or older. The median age was 34 years. For every 100 females, there were 112.9 males. For every 100 females age 18 and over, there were 101.9 males.

The median income for a household in the village was $29,861, and the median income for a family was $31,667. Males had a median income of $28,056 versus $17,143 for females. The per capita income for the village was $11,985. About 11.3% of families and 19.8% of the population were below the poverty line, including 18.9% of those under the age of eighteen and none of those 65 or over.
