= George W. Auch =

American politician (1868–1937)

- Born: 1868; Sebewaing, Michigan, U.S.
- Died: 1937 (aged 68–69)
- Education: Addison College
- Occupations: Builder; educator; politician

George W. Auch (1868 – 1937) was an American builder, educator, and politician from Detroit, Michigan. He was the president of the Detroit school board and served as a city alderman.

== Early life ==
Auch was born in 1868 in Sebewaing, Michigan, the son of Sebewaing founder J.J.F. Auch. In 1890, George Auch began his studies at Addison College, a Lutheran teacher's college in Addison, Illinois. He graduated in 1893 and began teaching at Bethany Lutheran School on Detroit's east side.

By 1908, Auch and his wife Sofia had nine children, and he decided his teacher's salary wasn't enough to provide for his family. He quit his teaching job and started a construction business with Herman Winkler. The firm of Winkler and Auch began by working on small residential construction projects. However, by 1912, they were constructing schools, churches, and larger commercial buildings.

== Politics and public service ==
In 1913, Auch was elected school inspector, an office he held until 1917. He was elected president of the Detroit School Board twice during that time, and served as an officer of the National Education Association. He served as alderman of the city of Detroit from 1916 to 1918, running as a Republican.

== George W. Auch Company ==
During the World War I years, the construction business was slow; at some point during that time, Auch and Winkler parted ways and the George W. Auch Company emerged. During the 1920s, Auch built homes in Detroit's Boston-Edison and Indian Village districts, as well as in Grosse Pointe and Grosse Pointe Park.

Auch's business suffered during the Great Depression of the 1930s. His firm won the carpentry contracts for the Historic Trinity Lutheran Church and the United States Marine Hospital in Norfolk, Virginia; but Auch did not live to see his company emerge from the recession. He died in 1937 due to lingering complications from an automobile accident.

The leadership of the George W. Auch Company passed to his son Fred, who held it until the 1960s. Subsequent presidents included Hank Auch, George W. (Bill) Auch III, Fred J. Auch Jr, David Hamilton and Vincent DeLeonardis. The company has grown significantly over the years, averaging over $150 million in annual revenue between 1998 and 2008. As of 2016, the George W. Auch Company, now called Auch Construction, is a leading contracting firm in southeastern Michigan.
