= Bay Port Historic Commercial Fishing District =

- U.S. National Register of Historic Places
- U.S. Historic district
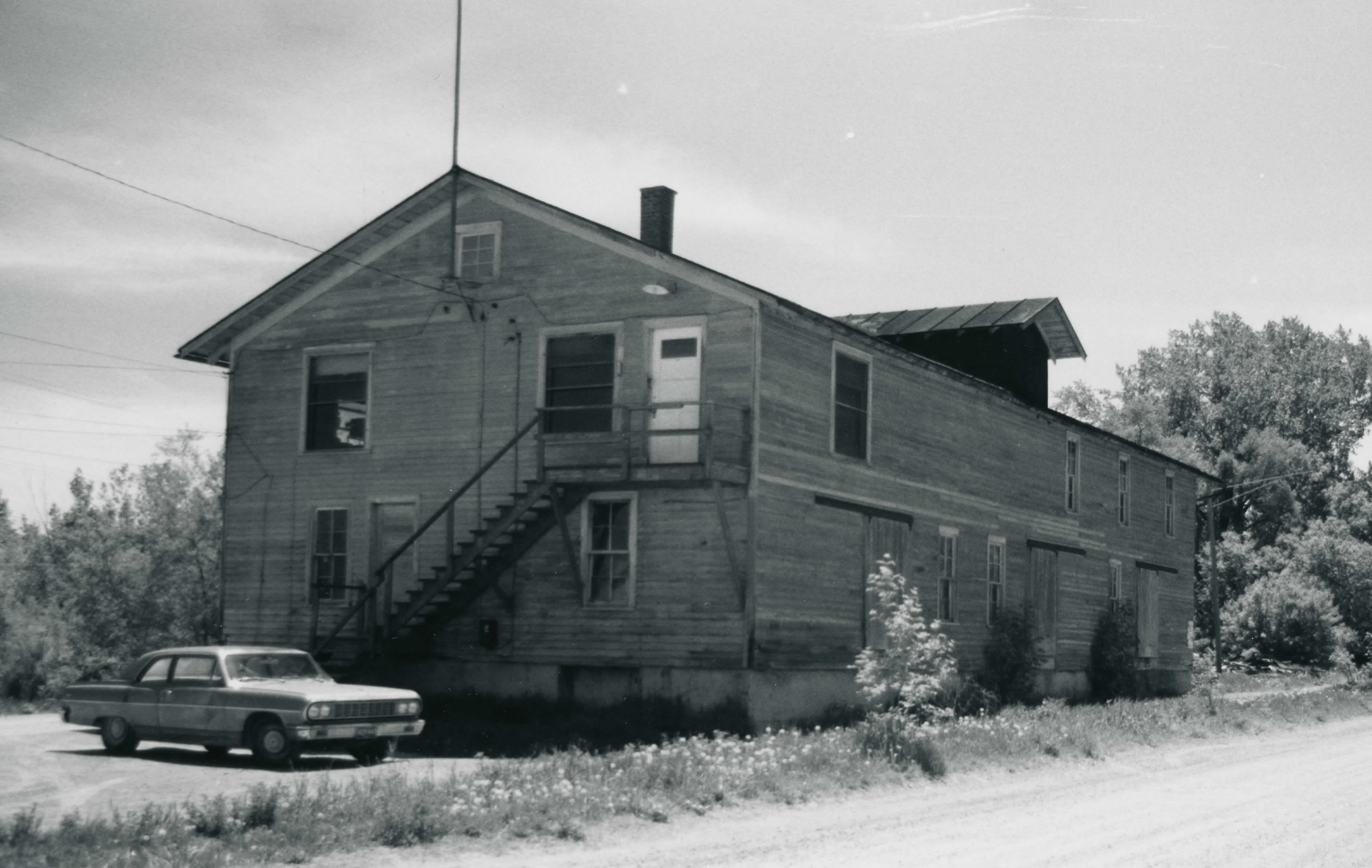
- Office building in 1974

- Location within Michigan Location within the United States
- Interactive map
- Location: Saginaw Bay end of Lakeside Dr. and First St., Bay Port, Michigan
- Coordinates: 43°51′14″N 83°22′25″W
- Area: 45 acres (18 ha)
- Built: 1920
- NRHP reference No.: 77000714
- Added to NRHP: September 22, 1977

The Bay Port Historic Commercial Fishing District is a commercial fishing historic district located on Lakeside Drive and First Street adjacent to Saginaw Bay in Bay Port, Michigan. The district was listed on the National Register of Historic Places in 1977.

== History ==
Bay Port was settled in the early 1860s, but it was not until the arrival of the railroad in 1886 that commercial fishing became a viable industry in the area. At about that time, Charles Gillingham and his family moved their fishing operations from North Island, located northwest of Bay Port, to this location on a man-made peninsula. In 1895, other local investors established the Bay Port Fish Company nearby. Both companies quickly grew, shipping lake herring, walleye, and whitefish via ice-filled rail cars to customers throughout the eastern United States.

By the 1920s and 1930s, Bay Port was known as the largest freshwater fishing port in the world, with over 30 fishing boats working from the port. Operations in what is now the historic district included ports for the boats, and also processing of the catch, repairs, and advertising and promotional offices. However, in 1945, a fire destroyed most of both Gillingham's operation and the Bay Port Fish Company's buildings. The Bay Port Fish Company closed, and Gillingham's president, Otto Schmidt, rebuilt some of the buildings. However, a general economic decline affected profits, and in 1949 Schmidt liquidated the previous company, reforming it as another entity to operate the remaining facilities. In 1965, Schmidt sold out to Henry Engelhard and Mel Dutcher, and by 1973 Engelhard was the sole owner of the business. In 1978, Engelhard died, and his heirs sold the operation to the Williams family, who continue to operate the Bay Port Fish Company as of 2017.

== Description ==
The Bay Port Historic Commercial Fishing District is centered on a man-made peninsula approximately 600 feet long and 100 to 500 feet wide, extending into Saginaw Bay. When the district was designated in 1977, only seven buildings were still extant in the district. As of 2017, it appears that only three of these are still standing. These are:

- Bay Port Fish Company Office Building: This building is located at the base of the peninsula. It is a two-story gable-roof wooden building on cement foundations. Built around 1920, the building houses the company offices and a storage area.
- Twine House: This building is located adjacent to the Office Building. It is a 1 1/2-story building sitting on a cement block foundation, with a sheet-metal gambrel roof accented by dormers. The building was constructed in 1945.
- Fish Processing Plant: This building is located at the end of the peninsula. It is a 1 1/2-story structure, with a cement block foundation and sheet-metal gambrel roof similar to the Twine House. Also constructed in 1945, the building is used to unload boats, process catch, and the public sale of fish.
