= Burtchville Township, Michigan =

- Civil township
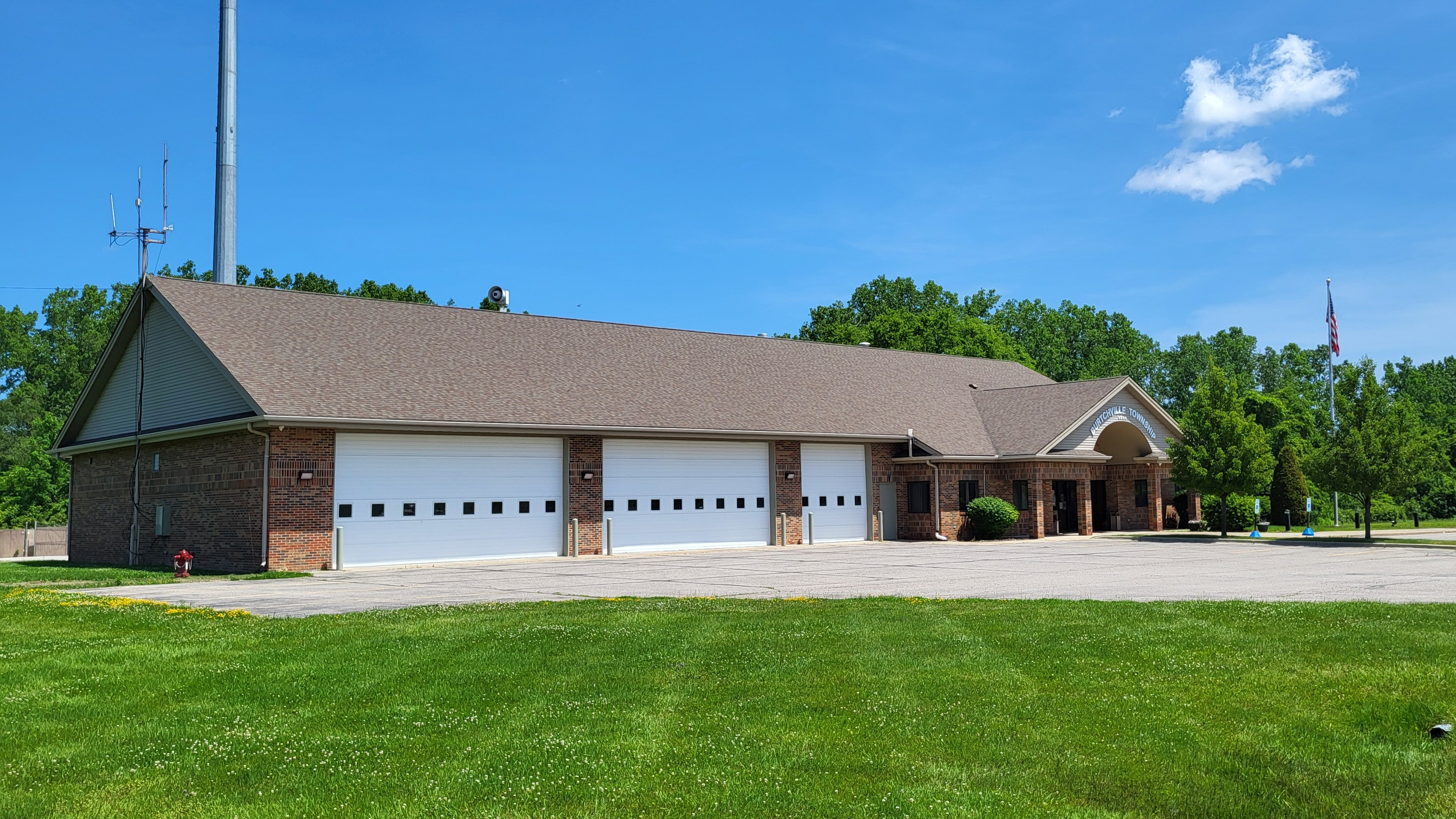
- Burtchville Township Offices in Lakeport

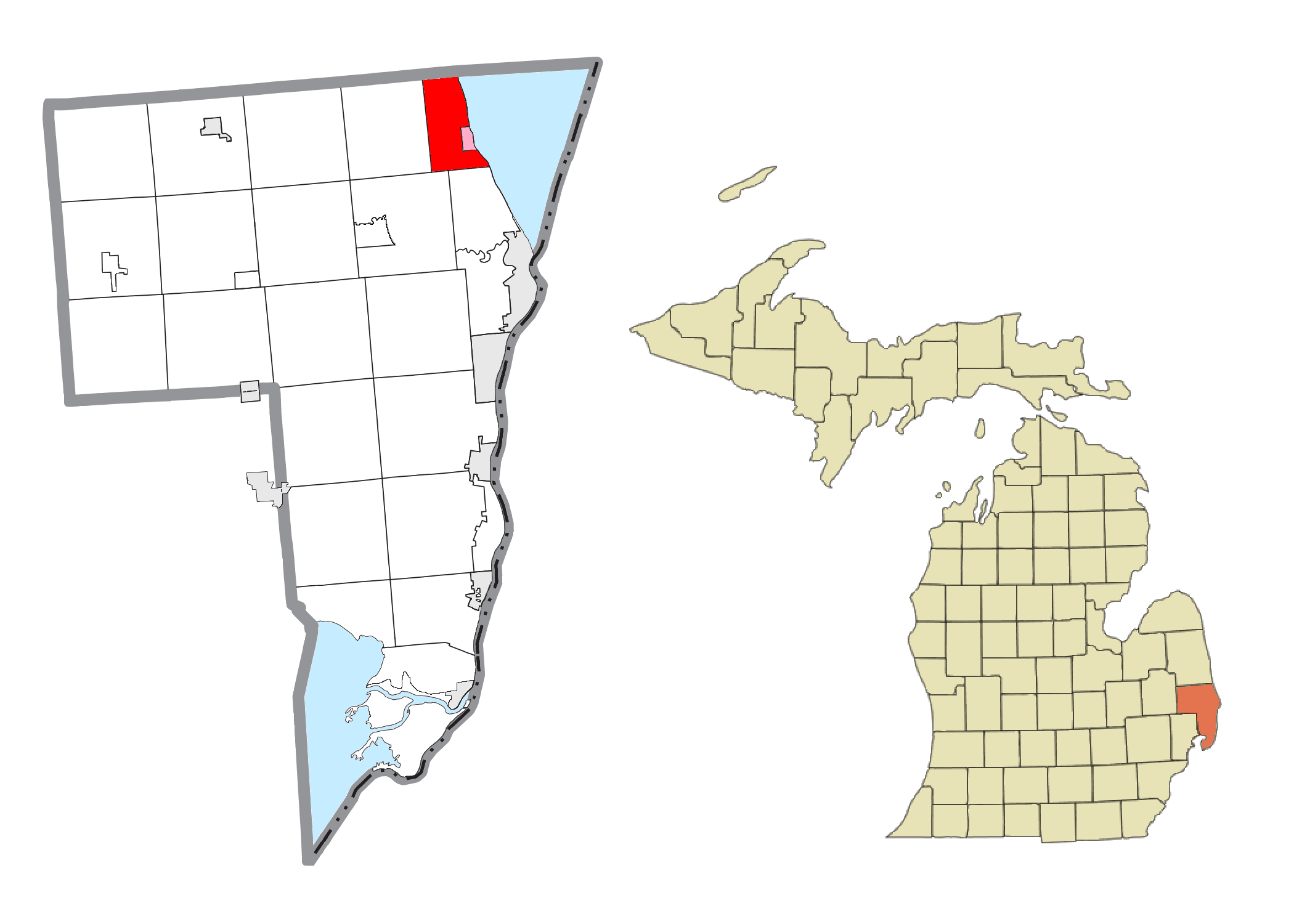
- Location within St. Clair County (red) and the administered CDP of Lakeport (pink)

- Location within the state of Michigan Location within the United States
- Coordinates: 43°07′09″N 82°29′58″W
- Country: United States
- State: Michigan
- County: St. Clair
- Settled: 1840
- Established: 1862

Government
  - Supervisor: Michael Appel
  - Clerk: Robert Bailey

Area
  - Total: 15.57 sq mi (40.33 km^{2})
  - Land: 15.55 sq mi (40.27 km^{2})
  - Water: 0.019 sq mi (0.05 km^{2})
- Elevation: 627 ft (191 m)

Population (2020)
  - Total: 4,077
  - Density: 262.19/sq mi (101.23/km^{2})
- Time zone: UTC-5 (Eastern (EST))
  - Summer (DST): UTC-4 (EDT)
- ZIP code(s): 48059 (Fort Gratiot)
- Area code: 810
- FIPS code: 26-12020
- GNIS feature ID: 1626010
- Website: Official website

Burtchville Township is a civil township of St. Clair County in the U.S. state of Michigan. As of the 2020 Census, the township population was 4,077.

Lumberman Jonathon Burtch settled here in 1840. The township was named for him and he became the first supervisor when it was organized in 1862.

== Communities ==
- Burtchville was a separate village on the Black River. It had a post office from 1846 to 1857 with Hannibal Hollister as the Postmaster. The post office was transferred to Lakeport in 1857.
- Evergreen had a post office from 1884 until 1886.
- Lakeport is an unincorporated community and census-designated place on the shore of Lake Huron. In 1837, Jonas H. Titus platted "Milwaukie City" at the mouth of the stream then named Milwaukie Creek (now spelled as "Milwaukee Creek"). However the plat was not recorded and nothing came of it until lumberman B.C. Farrand had the village replatted in 1853 and recorded under the name "Lakeport" in August 1858. A post office operated from June 1857 until April 1911. Lakeport State Park is adjacent to the community on three sides.
- North Lakeport is an unincorporated community approximately one mile north of Lakeport at 43°08′14″N 82°29′49″W

== Geography ==
According to the United States Census Bureau, the township has a total area of 15.6 square miles (40 km^{2}), of which 15.6 square miles (40 km^{2}) is land and 0.04 square miles (0.10 km^{2}) (0.13%) is water.

== Demographics ==
As of the census of 2000, there were 3,956 people, 1,616 households, and 1,124 families residing in the township. The population density was 253.4 inhabitants per square mile (97.8/km^{2}). There were 1,880 housing units at an average density of 120.4 per square mile (46.5/km^{2}). The racial makeup of the township was 97.40% White, 0.30% African American, 0.40% Native American, 0.30% Asian, 0.03% Pacific Islander, 0.18% from other races, and 1.39% from two or more races. Hispanic or Latino of any race were 1.79% of the population.

There were 1,616 households, out of which 31.9% had children under the age of 18 living with them, 55.6% were married couples living together, 9.8% had a female householder with no husband present, and 30.4% were non-families. 24.8% of all households were made up of individuals, and 9.2% had someone living alone who was 65 years of age or older. The average household size was 2.44 and the average family size was 2.91.

In the township the population was spread out, with 24.4% under the age of 18, 8.1% from 18 to 24, 29.9% from 25 to 44, 25.1% from 45 to 64, and 12.5% who were 65 years of age or older. The median age was 37 years. For every 100 females, there were 93.7 males. For every 100 females age 18 and over, there were 92.8 males.

The median income for a household in the township was $43,830, and the median income for a family was $50,813. Males had a median income of $39,688 versus $21,667 for females. The per capita income for the township was $22,782. About 5.6% of families and 6.4% of the population were below the poverty line, including 8.0% of those under age 18 and 3.7% of those age 65 or over.
