= Brookfield Township, Huron County, Michigan =

Brookfield Township, Michigan
- Civil township
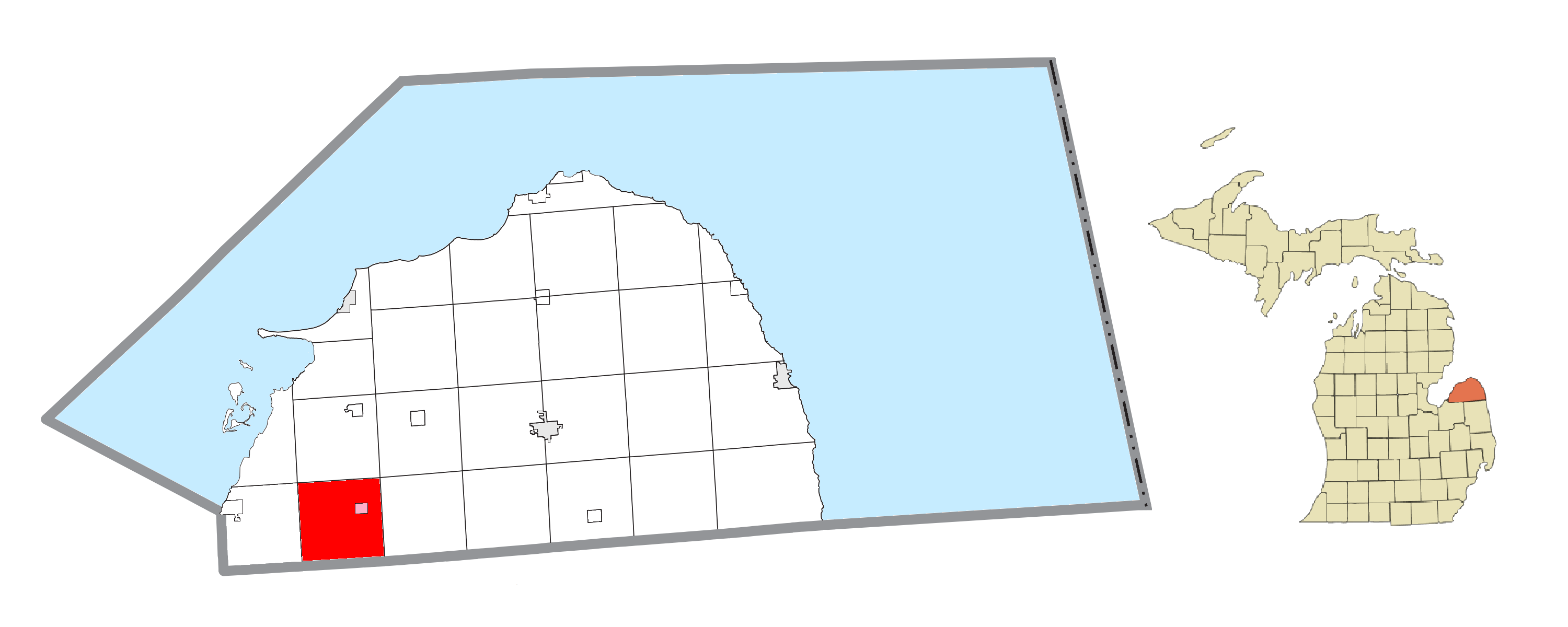
- Location within Huron County (red) and the administered village of Owendale (pink)

- Location within the state of Michigan Brookfield Township (the United States)
- Coordinates: 43°43′57″N 83°17′13″W
- Country: United States
- State: Michigan
- County: Huron
- Organized: 1868

Area
  - Total: 35.5 sq mi (92.0 km^{2})
  - Land: 35.5 sq mi (92.0 km^{2})
  - Water: 0 sq mi (0.0 km^{2})
- Elevation: 630 ft (192 m)

Population (2020)
  - Total: 739
  - Density: 20.8/sq mi (8.03/km^{2})
- Time zone: UTC-5 (Eastern (EST))
  - Summer (DST): UTC-4 (EDT)
- ZIP code(s): 48735, 48754, 48755, 48759
- Area code: 989
- FIPS code: 26-10940
- GNIS feature ID: 1625988

Brookfield Township is a civil township of Huron County in the U.S. state of Michigan. As of the 2020 census, the township population was 739.

== History ==
Broofield Township was organized in 1868.

== Communities ==
- The Village of Owendale is within the Township.
- Bach is an unincorporated community on the Township's border with Sebewaing Township at Bach and Bay Port Roads 43°40′59″N 83°21′21″W with side streets (Liken and Bartholomy) in Sebewaing.
- Creel was a rural post office in the township from 1886 until 1889.
- Crew was the name of a rural post office in the township from 1904 until 1907.
- Kilmanagh is an unincorporated community partially in the northwest corner of the township at 43°45′22″N 83°21′25″W.
- Linkville is an unincorporated community on the Township's border with Winsor Township on Kilmanagh Road between Caseville and Notter Road 43°45′29″N 83°16′02″W. with the community's Linkville Cemetery on Stein Road between Caseville and Notter Road in Winsor Township.

== Geography ==
According to the United States Census Bureau, the township has a total area of 35.5 square miles (92 km^{2}), all land.

== Demographics ==
As of the census of 2000, there were 914 people, 329 households, and 226 families residing in the township. The population density was 25.7 inhabitants per square mile (9.9/km^{2}). There were 369 housing units at an average density of 10.4 per square mile (4.0/km^{2}). The racial makeup of the township was 98.91% White, 0.22% Asian, and 0.88% from two or more races. Hispanic or Latino of any race were 6.24% of the population.

There were 329 households, out of which 31.0% had children under the age of 18 living with them, 57.1% were married couples living together, 7.3% had a female householder with no husband present, and 31.3% were non-families. 24.3% of all households were made up of individuals, and 15.8% had someone living alone who was 65 years of age or older. The average household size was 2.53 and the average family size was 3.04.

In the township the population was spread out, with 25.1% under the age of 18, 9.1% from 18 to 24, 25.5% from 25 to 44, 22.5% from 45 to 64, and 17.8% who were 65 years of age or older. The median age was 39 years. For every 100 females, there were 100.0 males. For every 100 females age 18 and over, there were 92.4 males.

The median income for a household in the township was $32,656, and the median income for a family was $39,167. Males had a median income of $29,922 versus $19,297 for females. The per capita income for the township was $14,737. About 5.6% of families and 14.3% of the population were below the poverty line, including 9.5% of those under age 18 and 7.2% of those age 65 or over.
