= Bay Port, Michigan =

- Census-designated place (CDP) & unincorporated community
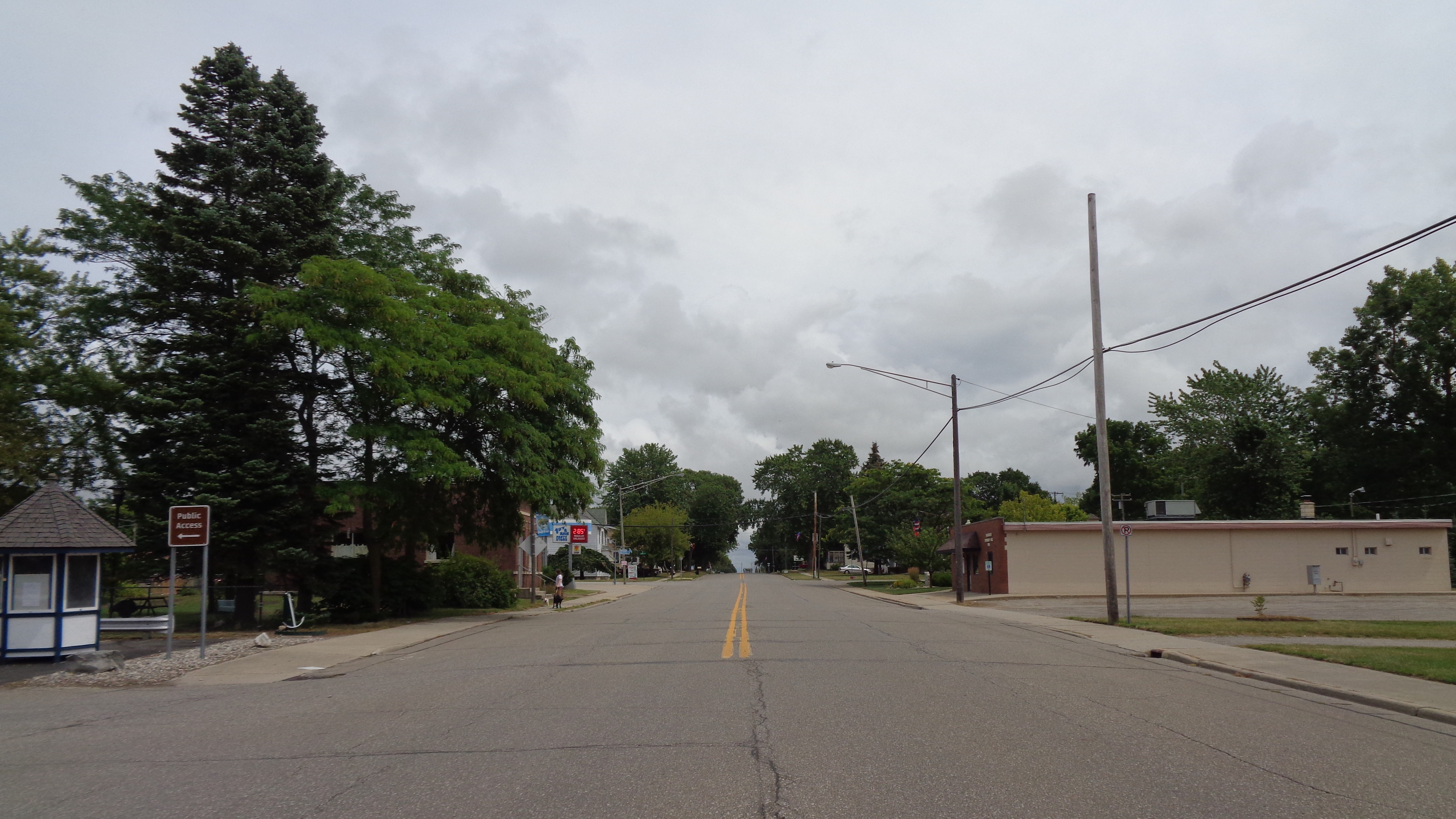
- Community of Bay Port along M-25

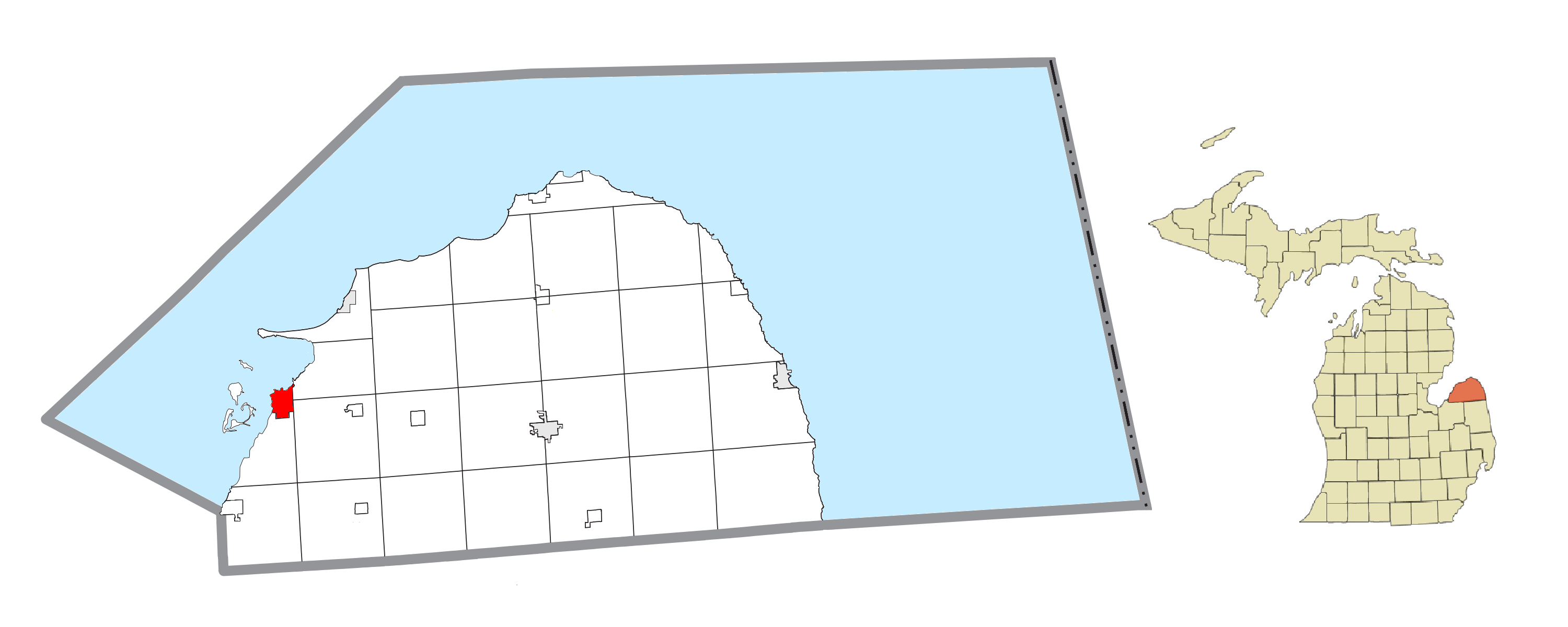
- Location within Huron County

- Location within the state of Michigan Location within the United States
- Coordinates: 43°50′57″N 83°22′23″W
- Country: United States
- State: Michigan
- County: Huron
- Townships: Fairhaven and McKinley
- Settled: 1851

Area
  - Total: 3.36 sq mi (8.70 km^{2})
  - Land: 3.35 sq mi (8.67 km^{2})
  - Water: 0.012 sq mi (0.03 km^{2})
- Elevation: 600 ft (180 m)

Population (2020)
  - Total: 464
  - Density: 138.6/sq mi (53.52/km^{2})
- Time zone: UTC-5 (Eastern (EST))
  - Summer (DST): UTC-4 (EDT)
- ZIP code(s): 48720
- Area code: 989
- FIPS code: 26-06120
- GNIS feature ID: 0620789

Bay Port is an unincorporated community and census-designated place (CDP) in Huron County in the U.S. state of Michigan. The population was 582 at the 2020 census. As an unincorporated community, Bay Port has no legal autonomy of its own, but does have its own post office with the 48720 ZIP Code.

== History ==
Bay Port was settled in 1851 by Carl H. Heisterman. It was first named "Geneva" and later "Wild Fowl Port". The post office was relocated here from Ora Labora in 1872.

Commercial fishing became the defining industry of Bay Port following the arrival of the railroad in 1886, which connected the village to markets across the eastern United States. That year, Charles Gillingham moved his fishing operations from nearby North Island to a man-made peninsula on Saginaw Bay, establishing what became the R. L. Gillingham Fish Company. In 1895, local investors founded the Bay Port Fish Company on the same peninsula. Both operations shipped lake herring, walleye, and whitefish packed in ice-filled rail cars to customers in Detroit, Chicago, New York, and other eastern cities. By the 1920s and 1930s, Bay Port was known as the largest freshwater fishing port in the world, with over 30 boats working from the harbor during peak seasons. The industry's decline came as a result of Saginaw Bay pollution, the invasive sea lamprey, and increasing state regulation.

The Bay Port Historic Commercial Fishing District is a located within the community and is listed on the National Register of Historic Places.

== Geography ==
According to the U.S. Census Bureau, Bay Port has a total area of 3.37 square miles (8.73 km^{2}), of which 3.34 square miles (8.65 km^{2}) is land and 0.03 square miles (0.08 km^{2}) (0.89%) is water.

Bay Port is a community on the shores of Saginaw Bay within Lake Huron. The majority of the CDP is located within Fairhaven Township with only a very small portion within McKinley Township. The U.S. Census Bureau lists 3.34 square miles (8.65 km^{2}) and 475 residents within Fairhaven Township, while only 0.03 square miles (0.08 km^{2}) and two residents are within McKinley Township.

=== Major highways ===
- M-25 runs along the Lake Huron coastline through the community.
- M-142, known locally as Pigeon Road begins in the community and runs east to the opposite side of the county.

== Events ==
Each year, during the first full weekend of August, Bay Port hosts its annual Fish Sandwich Festival.

Bay Port's unofficial motto is "Where the fish caught the man", due to its easy lake access for sport fishermen.

== Demographics ==
Historical population
Census	Pop.	Note	%±
2020	464		—
U.S. Decennial Census

Bay Port had a reported population of 582 in 2020. The population is primarily white, making up 96.22% of the population. The next biggest racial group is Asian, with 2.29%. Native Americans make up less than one percent of the population.

== Notable people ==
- Sanford A. Brown (1909–1986), Michigan state treasurer
