= Michigan Sugar =

Agricultural cooperative

Michigan Sugar Company
- Type: Agricultural marketing cooperative
- Founded: 1906
- Headquarters: Bay City, Michigan
- Area served: Michigan
- Products: Sugar
- Members: 1,000+
- Number of employees: Year round 1,000, plus 1,100 seasonal
- Website: michigansugar.com

Michigan Sugar Company is an agricultural cooperative, based in Bay City, Michigan, that specializes in the processing of beet sugar. Founded in 1906, Michigan Sugar sells beet sugar under the brand names Big Chief and Pioneer.

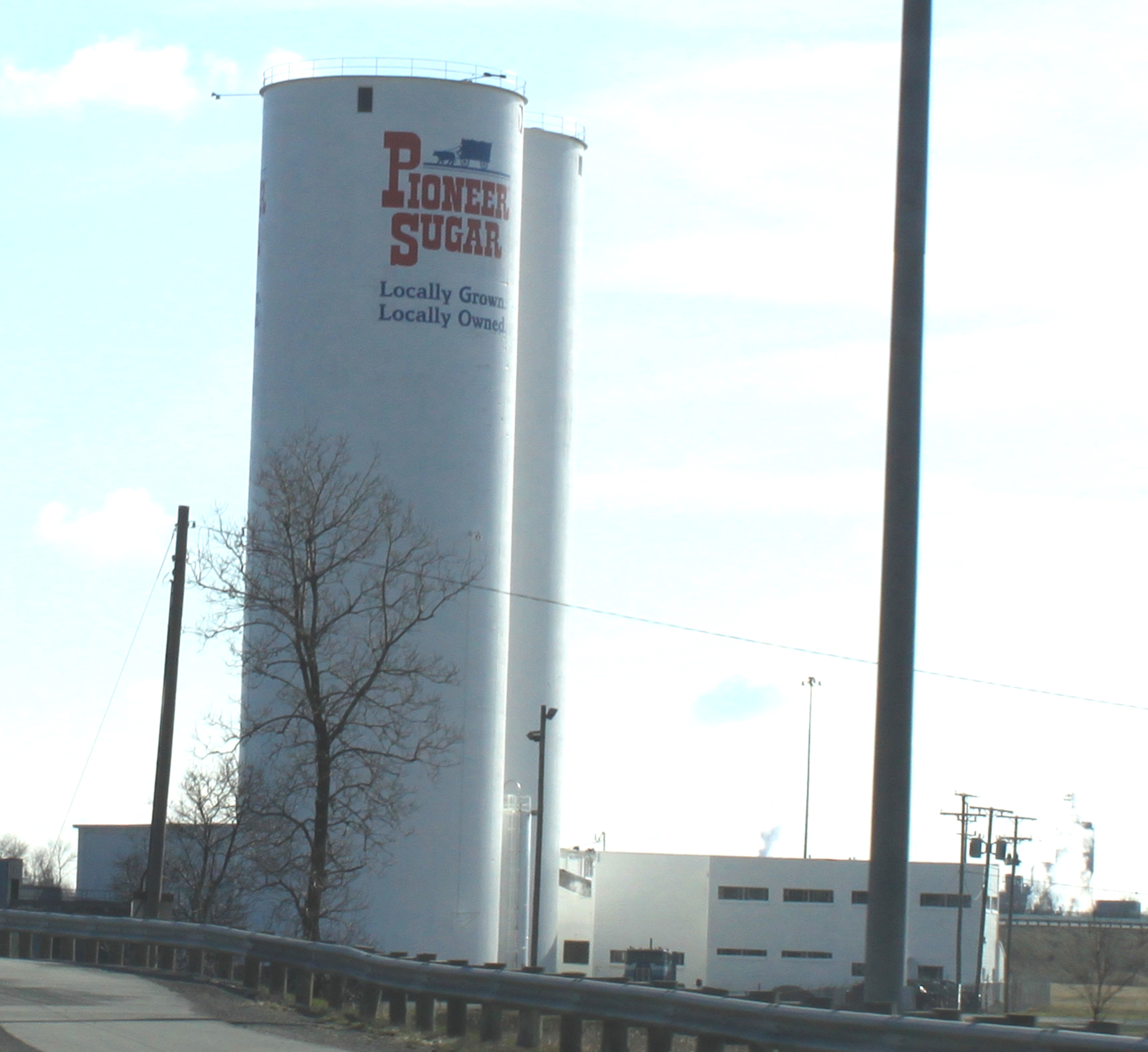
Findlay sugar terminal

Michigan Sugar operates four beet sugar factories, located in Bay City, Caro, Croswell, and Sebewaing, and operates three shipping and distribution centers in Michigan and the adjacent state of Ohio. The firm has a permanent employment headcount of 1,000 employees, to which are added 1,100 additional seasonal employees during the times of year when sugar beets are harvested and processed.

During much of its history, Michigan Sugar was a publicly traded, private-sector firm. It was later a subsidiary of Imperial Sugar; after the 2001 bankruptcy of its former parent firm, Michigan Sugar became a cooperative in February 2002. Since that time, the cooperative has been owned by a consortium of more than 1,000 sugar beet farmers, mostly located in Michigan's Thumb, who grow beets for processing.

Michigan is a large producer of beet sugar:

"From farm fields to your table, the process of turning a sugarbeet seed into all-natural sugar takes many steps — some on the farm and others in the factory. It starts with planting the seeds each spring, continues through harvest in the fall and wraps up during an annual sugarbeet processing campaign at Michigan Sugar Company’s factories in Bay City, Caro, Croswell and Sebewaing."

Under the trade names of Pioneer Sugar and Big Chief Sugar, Michigan Sugar's plants "produce roughly 1.2 billion pounds of sugar each year."

== Controversies ==
The company's Bay City sugar beet processing plant located on South Euclid Avenue produces an offensive odor which can be described as burnt peanut butter, or vomit. Many complaints are received every year on the basis of the smell, and it is alleged to have been getting worse. The plant is located on the Southwest side of town, and winds prevail from the West, so very regularly much of the Southeastern and Eastern residential areas are affected.

In 2004, the company settled with 3,800 families living near the plant for $1.75 million as the result of a class action lawsuit filed due to the offensive odor and pollution concerns. In 2017, the Michigan Department of Environmental Quality sued the company over the complaints mostly related to odors. The suit was settled in 2019 with the result that Michigan Sugar would pay a $300,000 fine and support or create two environmental projects totaling $262,500.

== See also ==
- Amalgamated Sugar Company, a parallel firm centering on beet farms in Idaho and Utah
- American Crystal Sugar Company, a parallel firm centering on beet farms in the Red River Valley of Minnesota and North Dakota
- Western Sugar Cooperative, a parallel firm based in Colorado
- Michigan Sugar Festival, a festival held in Sebewaing, Michigan, and dedicated to the sugar beet
