= McKinley Township, Huron County, Michigan =

McKinley Township, Michigan
- Civil township
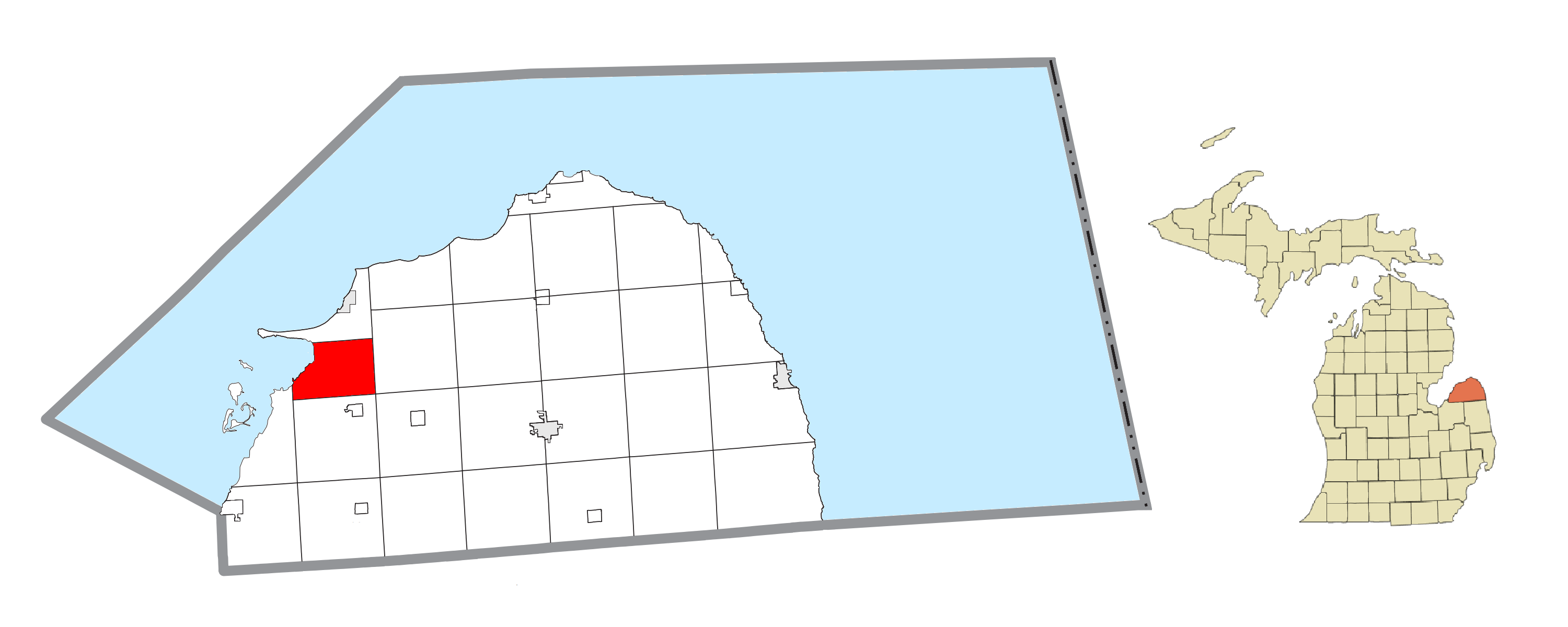
- Location within Huron County

- Location within the state of Michigan McKinley Township (the United States)
- Coordinates: 43°52′23″N 83°18′08″W
- Country: United States
- State: Michigan
- County: Huron

Area
  - Total: 20.7 sq mi (53.6 km^{2})
  - Land: 20.3 sq mi (52.7 km^{2})
  - Water: 0.35 sq mi (0.9 km^{2})
- Elevation: 617 ft (188 m)

Population (2020)
  - Total: 401
  - Density: 19.7/sq mi (7.61/km^{2})
- Time zone: UTC-5 (Eastern (EST))
  - Summer (DST): UTC-4 (EDT)
- ZIP code(s): 48720, 48755
- Area code: 989
- FIPS code: 26-50360
- GNIS feature ID: 1626657

McKinley Township is a civil township of Huron County in the U.S. state of Michigan. The population was 401 at the 2020 census.

== Communities ==
- Bay Port is an unincorporated community and census-designated place (CDP) primarily located within Fairhaven Township, with a very small portion extending into McKinley Township.
- Berne is an unincorporated community on the Township's border with Winsor Township at Berne Road and Berne Street 43°50′41″N 83°16′10″W (Elevation: 620).

== Geography ==
According to the United States Census Bureau, the township has a total area of 20.7 square miles (53.6 km^{2}), of which 20.3 square miles (52.7 km^{2}) is land and 0.3 square mile (0.9 km^{2}) (1.69%) is water.

== Demographics ==
As of the census of 2000, there were 503 people, 201 households, and 154 families residing in the township. The population density was 24.7 inhabitants per square mile (9.5/km^{2}). There were 292 housing units at an average density of 14.4 per square mile (5.6/km^{2}). The racial makeup of the township was 98.01% White, 0.80% African American, 0.40% Native American, 0.20% Asian, 0.20% from other races, and 0.40% from two or more races. Hispanic or Latino of any race were 1.59% of the population.

There were 201 households, out of which 26.4% had children under the age of 18 living with them, 70.6% were married couples living together, 3.5% had a female householder with no husband present, and 22.9% were non-families. 20.9% of all households were made up of individuals, and 12.9% had someone living alone who was 65 years of age or older. The average household size was 2.50 and the average family size was 2.92.

In the township the population was spread out, with 22.3% under the age of 18, 5.8% from 18 to 24, 22.5% from 25 to 44, 29.2% from 45 to 64, and 20.3% who were 65 years of age or older. The median age was 45 years. For every 100 females, there were 112.2 males. For every 100 females age 18 and over, there were 104.7 males. The median income for a household in the township was $37,212, and the median income for a family was $42,344. Males had a median income of $33,500 versus $24,063 for females. The per capita income for the township was $17,453. About 4.7% of families and 5.3% of the population were below the poverty line, including 2.9% of those under age 18 and 5.3% of those age 65 or over.
