= Lakeport, Michigan =

- Census-designated place (CDP) & unincorporated community
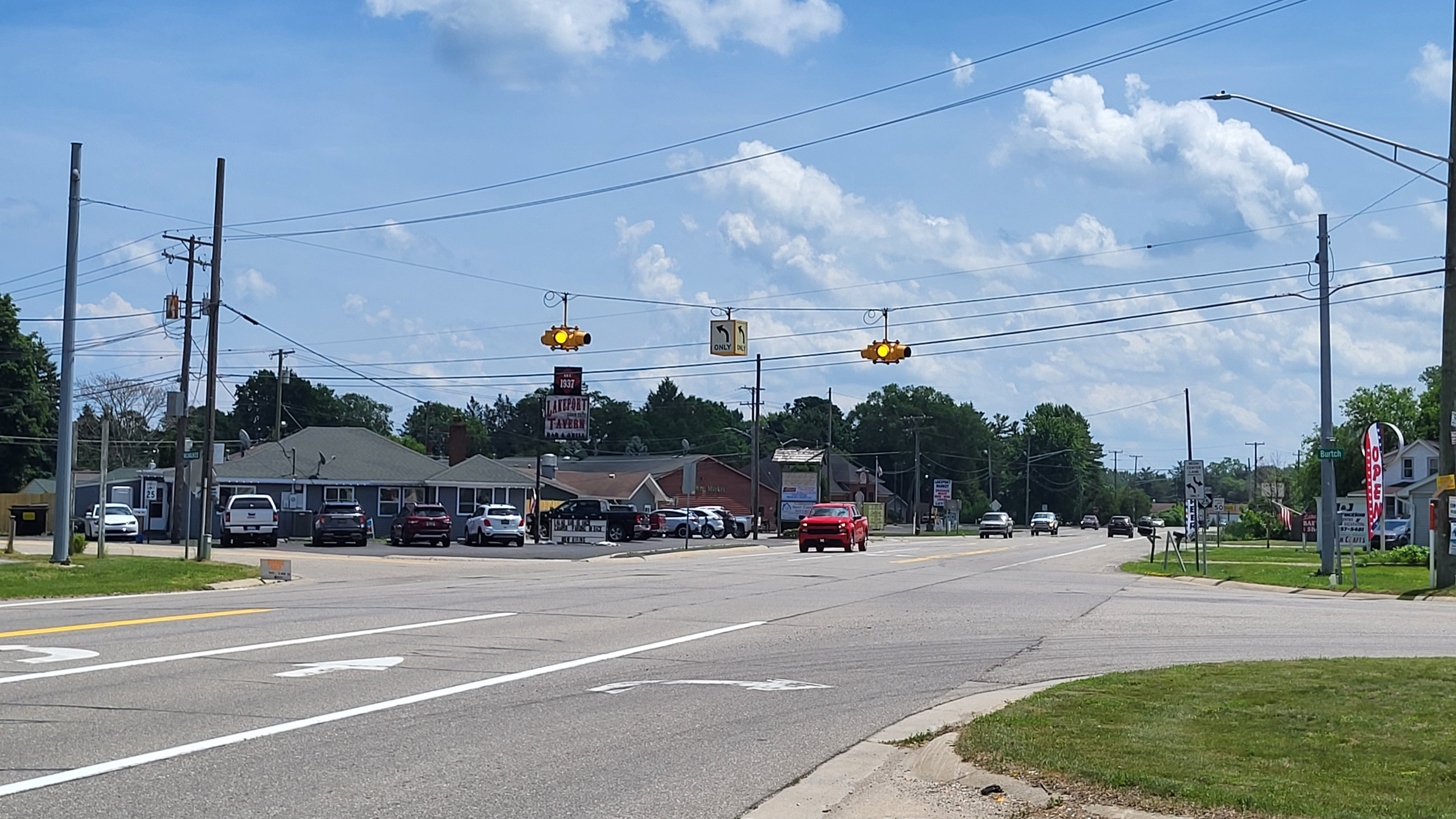
- Looking south along Lakeshore Road (M-25)

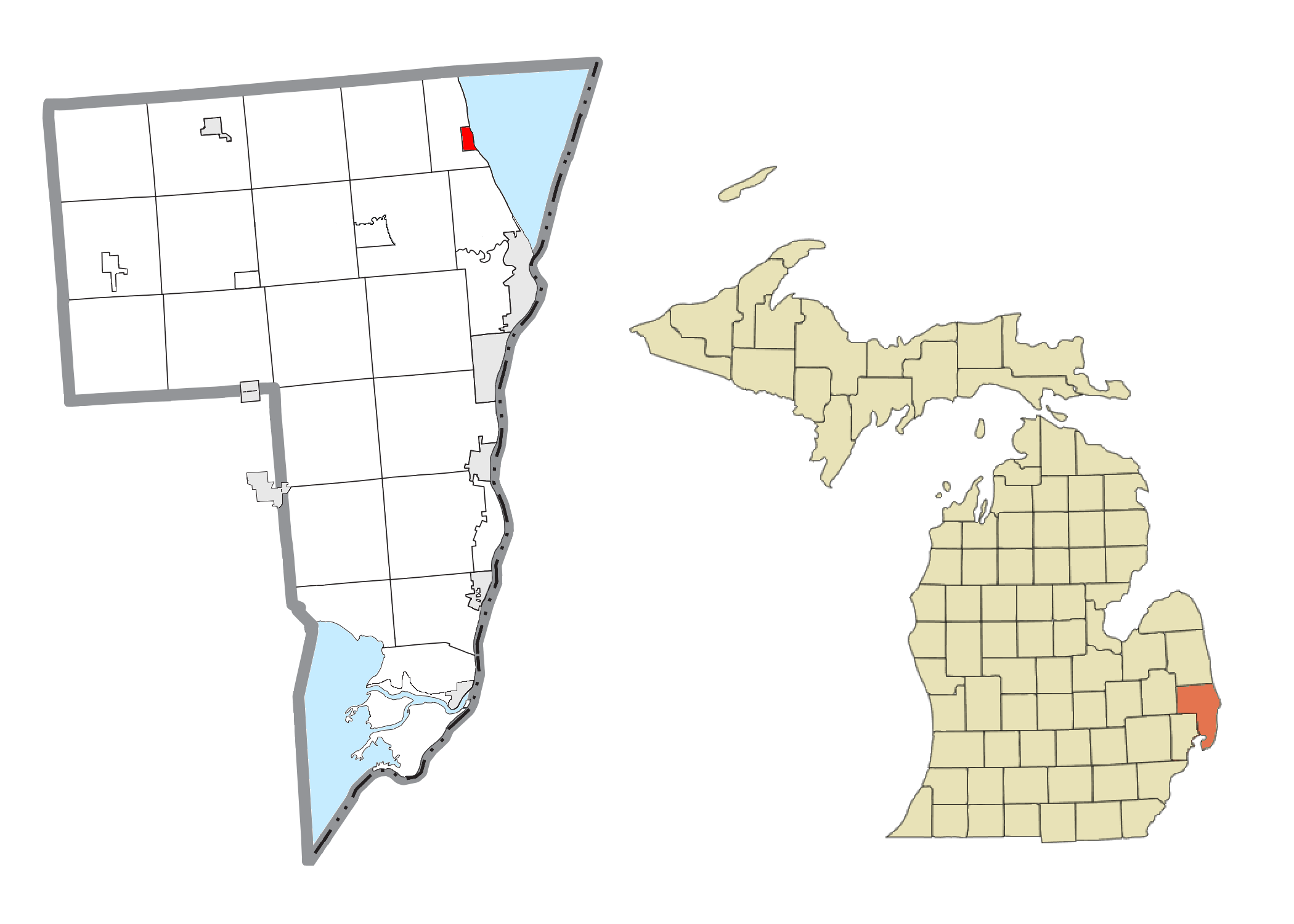
- Location within St. Clair County

- Location within the state of Michigan Location within the United States
- Coordinates: 43°06′54″N 82°29′25″W
- Country: United States
- State: Michigan
- County: St. Clair
- Township: Burtchville
- Settled: 1837
- Platted: 1858

Area
  - Total: 1.03 sq mi (2.68 km^{2})
  - Land: 1.03 sq mi (2.67 km^{2})
  - Water: 0.0039 sq mi (0.01 km^{2})
- Elevation: 597 ft (182 m)

Population (2020)
  - Total: 720
  - Density: 699.03/sq mi (269.90/km^{2})
- Time zone: UTC-5 (Eastern (EST))
  - Summer (DST): UTC-4 (EDT)
- ZIP code(s): 48059 (Fort Gratiot)
- Area code: 810
- GNIS feature ID: 1624657; 2806355

Lakeport is an unincorporated community and census-designated place (CDP) in St. Clair County in the U.S. state of Michigan. Located along the southern shores of Lake Huron, the community is centered along M-25 within Burtchville Township. As an unincorporated community, Lakeport has no legal autonomy of its own. The CDP had a population of 720 at the 2020 census.

== Geography ==
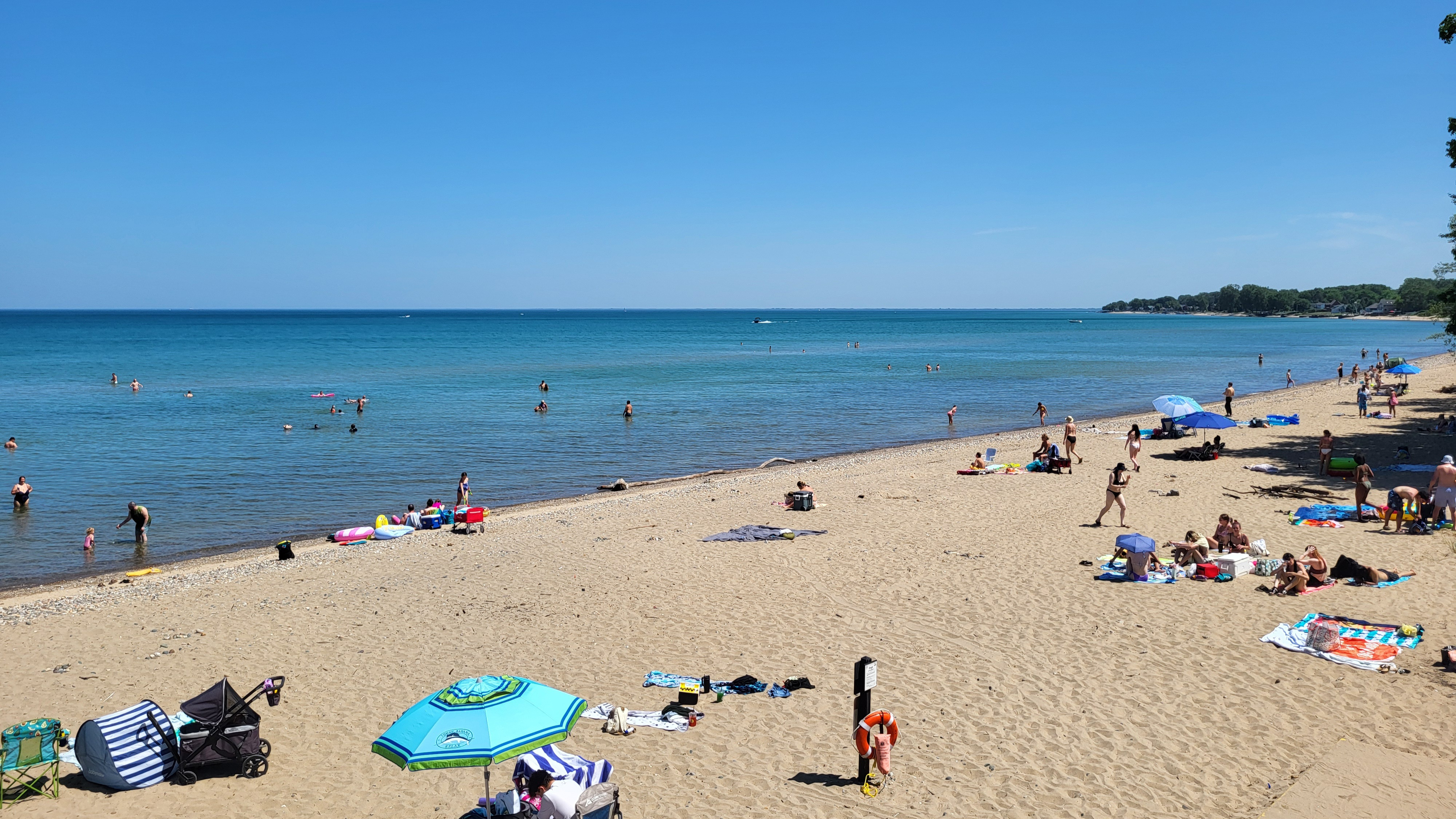
Lake Huron beachfront in Lakeport State Park within the community of Lakeport

According to the U.S. Census Bureau, the CDP has a total area of 1.034 square miles (2.68 km^{2}), of which 1.030 square miles (2.67 km^{2}) is land and 0.004 square miles (0.01 km^{2}) is water.

Lakeport is a small unincorporated community in Burtchville Township in northern St. Clair County about 8.0 miles (12.9 km) north of the city of Port Huron. Along the southern shores of Lake Huron, the community sits at an elevation of 597 feet (182 m) above sea level. Located about 70 miles (110 km) away from the city of Detroit, it is one of the northeasternmost communities included in the Detroit–Warren–Dearborn Metropolitan Statistical Area (Metro Detroit). The community is centered along M-25, which is known locally as Lakeshore Road. North Lakeport is a distinct unincorporated community located just north of Lakeport. Other nearby communities include Jeddo to the northwest, Blaine to the west, North Street and Ruby to the southwest, and Keewahdin to the south. Along with Port Huron, the next nearest incorporated community is the village of Lexington in Sanilac County about 10 miles (16.1 km) to the north.

Along the shores of Lake Huron, the community is a popular tourist destination due to Lakeport State Park. The park occupies a total area of 565 acres (229 ha) and contains two separate units with the center of the Lakeport community in between. A beachfront and picnic area is to the south, while two campground units and another beach are located to the north.

Milwaukee Creek is a small stream that runs through the community of Lakeport. The Burtchville Township Offices and fire department are located in the western portion of the community at 4000 Burtch Road, and the Burtchville Township Library is located at 7093 Second Street. The community of Lakeport is within the northern boundaries of the Port Huron Area School District. The only school within the community is the parochial St. Edward on the Lake School located at 6995 Lakeshore Road. This primary school is part of the Roman Catholic Archdiocese of Detroit.

The community of Lakeport no longer contains its own post office and is served by the Fort Gratiot 48059 ZIP Code, which has its post office located to the south in Birchwood Mall. The name Lakeport is still acceptable for mail delivery in the area.

== History ==
The area was first settled as early as 1837 when Jonas Titus formed the new community of Milwaukie City. It was named as such due to its location along the small stream of Milwaukie Creek. Milwaukie City was never officially recorded with the state, although the name was recognized and became an early sawmill community. It was alternatively spelled as Milwaukee City. The community was located within the unorganized Birchville Township, which was settled and named after lumberman Jonathan Burtch in 1840. A post office named Burtchville began operating on January 20, 1846.

In August 1853, lumberman B. C. Farrand and surveyor David Ward formally replatted the community of Milwaukie City and renamed it Lakeport. Farrand chose the new name due to its location along the shores of Lake Huron. The Burtchville post office would be transferred to and renamed as Lakeport on June 19, 1857. The name became official on August 30, 1858. The community first appeared as Lake Port on an early map of St. Clair County in 1859. The township itself was reorganized and formally established as Burtchville Township in 1862. The Lakeport post office operated until April 30, 1911.

In 1898, the United States Life-Saving Service established the Lake View Beach Station in Lakeport, which became part of the United States Coast Guard in 1915. This station operated until it was abandoned in 1946.

The first major highway through Lakeport was an early route of M-29, which was commissioned in 1926. The highway ran from Chesterfield Township through Lakeport and followed the shoreline of the Thumb region to Bay City. In 1933, M-29 was truncated, and the highway through Lakeport was renumbered as M-25 and commissioned to run concurrent with a northerly extension of U.S. Route 25 (US 25). In 1973, US 25 was completely decommissioned, and the roadway through Lakeport now carries only the M-25 designation, where it is known locally as Lakeshore Road.

For the 2020 census, Lakeport was included as a newly listed census-designated place (CDP), which is included for statistical purposes only. It is the smallest of the three CDPs in St. Clair County, which includes Pearl Beach and Ruby—all of which remain unincorporated communities with no legal autonomy of their own.

== Demographics ==
Historical population
| Census | Pop. | Note | %± |
|---|---|---|---|
| 2020 | 720 | | — |
U.S. Decennial Census

== Notable people ==
- Bruce J. McDonald, one-term mayor of Flint, Michigan (1904–1905), born in Lakeport.
