= Pigeon, Michigan =

- Village
- St. Francis Borgia Catholic Church

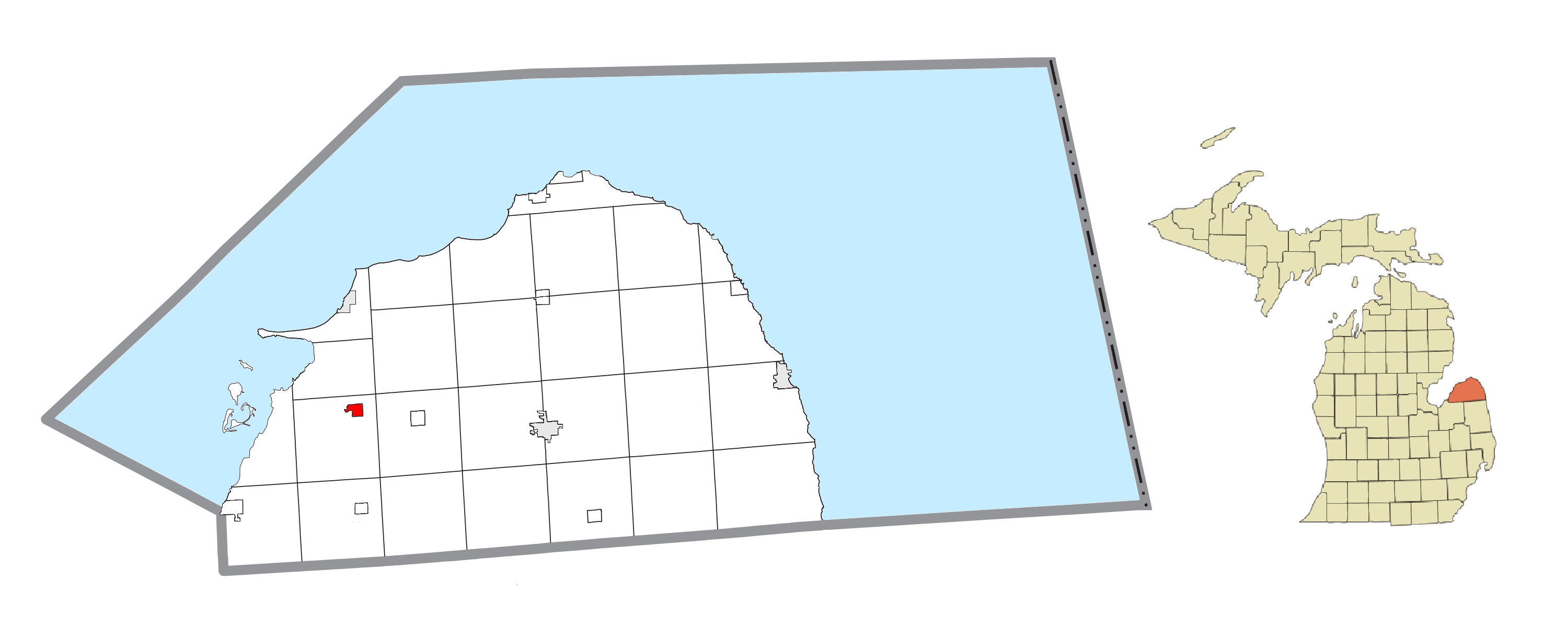
- Location within Huron County

- Location within the state of Michigan
- Coordinates: 43°49′47″N 83°16′19″W
- Country: United States
- State: Michigan
- County: Huron
- Township: Winsor
- Incorporated: 1903 (village)

Government
  - Type: Village council
  - President: Mike LePage

Area
  - Total: 0.80 sq mi (2.06 km^{2})
  - Land: 0.80 sq mi (2.06 km^{2})
  - Water: 0 sq mi (0.00 km^{2})
- Elevation: 620 ft (190 m)

Population (2020)
  - Total: 1,222
  - Density: 1,536.1/sq mi (593.11/km^{2})
- Time zone: UTC-5 (Eastern (EST))
  - Summer (DST): UTC-4 (EDT)
- ZIP code(s): 48755
- Area code: 989
- FIPS code: 26-64060
- GNIS feature ID: 0634847
- Website: Official website

Pigeon is a village in Huron County in the U.S. state of Michigan. As of the 2020 census, Pigeon had a population of 1,222. The village is within Winsor Township.

== Geography ==
- According to the United States Census Bureau, the village has a total area of 0.86 square miles (2.23 km^{2}), all land.

== Demographics ==
Historical population
| Census | Pop. | Note | %± |
|---|---|---|---|
| 1910 | 687 | | — |
| 1920 | 780 | | 13.5% |
| 1930 | 836 | | 7.2% |
| 1940 | 949 | | 13.5% |
| 1950 | 1,015 | | 7.0% |
| 1960 | 1,191 | | 17.3% |
| 1970 | 1,174 | | −1.4% |
| 1980 | 1,247 | | 6.2% |
| 1990 | 1,207 | | −3.2% |
| 2000 | 1,207 | | 0.0% |
| 2010 | 1,208 | | 0.1% |
| 2020 | 1,222 | | 1.2% |
U.S. Decennial Census

=== 2010 census ===
As of the census of 2010, there were 1,208 people, 551 households, and 323 families living in the village. The population density was 1,404.7 inhabitants per square mile (542.4/km^{2}). There were 621 housing units at an average density of 722.1 per square mile (278.8/km^{2}). The racial makeup of the village was 98.6% White, 0.3% African American, 0.2% Native American, 0.2% Asian, 0.2% from other races, and 0.5% from two or more races. Hispanic or Latino of any race were 2.8% of the population.

There were 551 households, of which 23.4% had children under the age of 18 living with them, 47.5% were married couples living together, 7.1% had a female householder with no husband present, 4.0% had a male householder with no wife present, and 41.4% were non-families. 39.2% of all households were made up of individuals, and 25.9% had someone living alone who was 65 years of age or older. The average household size was 2.13 and the average family size was 2.84.

The median age in the village was 47.2 years. 19.5% of residents were under the age of 18; 6.8% were between the ages of 18 and 24; 20.4% were from 25 to 44; 24.9% were from 45 to 64; and 28.2% were 65 years of age or older. The gender makeup of the village was 45.9% male and 54.1% female.

=== 2000 census ===
As of the census of 2000, there were 1,207 people, 496 households, and 332 families living in the village. The population density was 1,464.2 inhabitants per square mile (565.3/km^{2}). There were 518 housing units at an average density of 628.4 per square mile (242.6/km^{2}). The racial makeup of the village was 96.60% White, 0.17% African American, 0.33% Native American, 0.58% Asian, 1.08% from other races, and 1.24% from two or more races. Hispanic or Latino of any race were 2.57% of the population.

There were 496 households, out of which 27.6% had children under the age of 18 living with them, 57.3% were married couples living together, 6.0% had a female householder with no husband present, and 32.9% were non-families. 28.8% of all households were made up of individuals, and 16.9% had someone living alone who was 65 years of age or older. The average household size was 2.33 and the average family size was 2.84.

In the village, the population was spread out, with 22.0% under the age of 18, 6.0% from 18 to 24, 25.8% from 25 to 44, 20.2% from 45 to 64, and 26.1% who were 65 years of age or older. The median age was 42 years. For every 100 females, there were 89.5 males. For every 100 females age 18 and over, there were 85.1 males.

The median income for a household in the village was $33,618, and the median income for a family was $44,563. Males had a median income of $31,599 versus $19,886 for females. The per capita income for the village was $17,142. About 5.0% of families and 6.4% of the population were below the poverty line, including 9.0% of those under age 18 and 5.6% of those age 65 or over.

== Local attractions and activities ==
Pigeon Historical Depot Museum is in the downtown. The Grand Trunk Chesapeake and Ohio Railroad Depot is a state historical site. Local artifacts and memorabilia are displayed.

== See also ==
- List of villages in Michigan
