= Michigan Sugar Festival =

Annual event

- Status: active
- Genre: food festival
- Frequency: Annually
- Location: Sebewaing, Michigan
- Coordinates: 43°43′56″N 83°27′04″W
- Country: United States
- Years active: 123–124
- Inaugurated: 1902

The Michigan Sugar Festival is an event that occurs one weekend in the middle of June each year. It is held in the village of Sebewaing, Michigan.

== Purpose ==
The purpose of the festival is "To show the area's appreciation to the sugar industry which has purchased sugar beet crops from farmers and processed sugar here with local employees since 1902."

== History ==
During a Chamber of Commerce meeting in early February 1965, then President Herb Gettel opened a discussion about having a sugar festival in Sebewaing, one of the four towns in which the Michigan Sugar Company had a factory. The town's newspaper editor Walt Rummel, Norman Schroeder, and Carl Hess went to the company's headquarters in Saginaw, Michigan to propose the idea. The idea was a hit, and on March 4, 1965, the Sebewaing Chamber of Commerce voted to hold a Sebewaing Sugar Festival on July 2 and 3. It was the first major community celebration since the Sebewaing Centennial in 1953.

2020 saw officials cite the COVID-19 pandemic as grounds for cancellation. The 56th was deferred to 2021.

== Events ==
The village park is the location for the midway, which has local vendors selling goods, along with carnival games and rides for all ages. There is also an entertainment tent, where bands perform and a dance is held on the first night of the festival. The main events are the crowning of the Sugar Queen Friday night, the Grand Parade on Saturday morning, and the Fireworks show Saturday night. In addition, there are tractor pulls and softball tournaments, among other events.

=== Sugar Queen ===
The Sugar Queen was once called "the sweetest girl in the world." She, along with a first and second runner up, are determined in June. To run for Sugar Queen you must be ages 18–23 and live for at least one year in one of the "21 counties in the state of Michigan in which sugar beets are grown." A general knowledge of sugar beets is recommended.

Previous Queens include (no Queen in 2020):

Year	Queen
1965	Marry Ann Lacourse
1966	Judy Bollstetter
1969	Karen Rummel
1972	Laura (Shetler) Witczak
1977	Sharon Rase
1980	Lori Rase
1983	Deann Balash
1984	Debbie Smith
1988	Shelly Sieman
1991	Vickie Parrish
1992	Kristy Williamson
1993	Janna Gatton
1994	Nicole Longhini
1996	Leslie Donovan
1997	Sarah Zagata
2001	Amanda Kohl
2006	Erica Hoffman
2007	Samantha Bishop
2008	Rebecca Doerr
2009	Elizabeth Krhovsky
2010	Dana Davidson
2011	Kelsey Prohaska
2012	Taylor Janicek
2013	Victoria Hudgins
2014	Isabella Krolikowski
2015	Riley Smith
2016	McKenzie Reinhardt
2017	Kayla Ratajczak
2018	Paige Lupcke
2019	Channon Terrell
2020	Shaelynn Lavrack
2021	Ally Kemp

== Fund-raising ==
Many local businesses give donations to put on the festival, and the Sebewaing Fire Department takes donations year round for their Fireworks show. Donation boxes can be found all around the area at local businesses.
