= Sebewaing Township, Michigan =

- Civil township
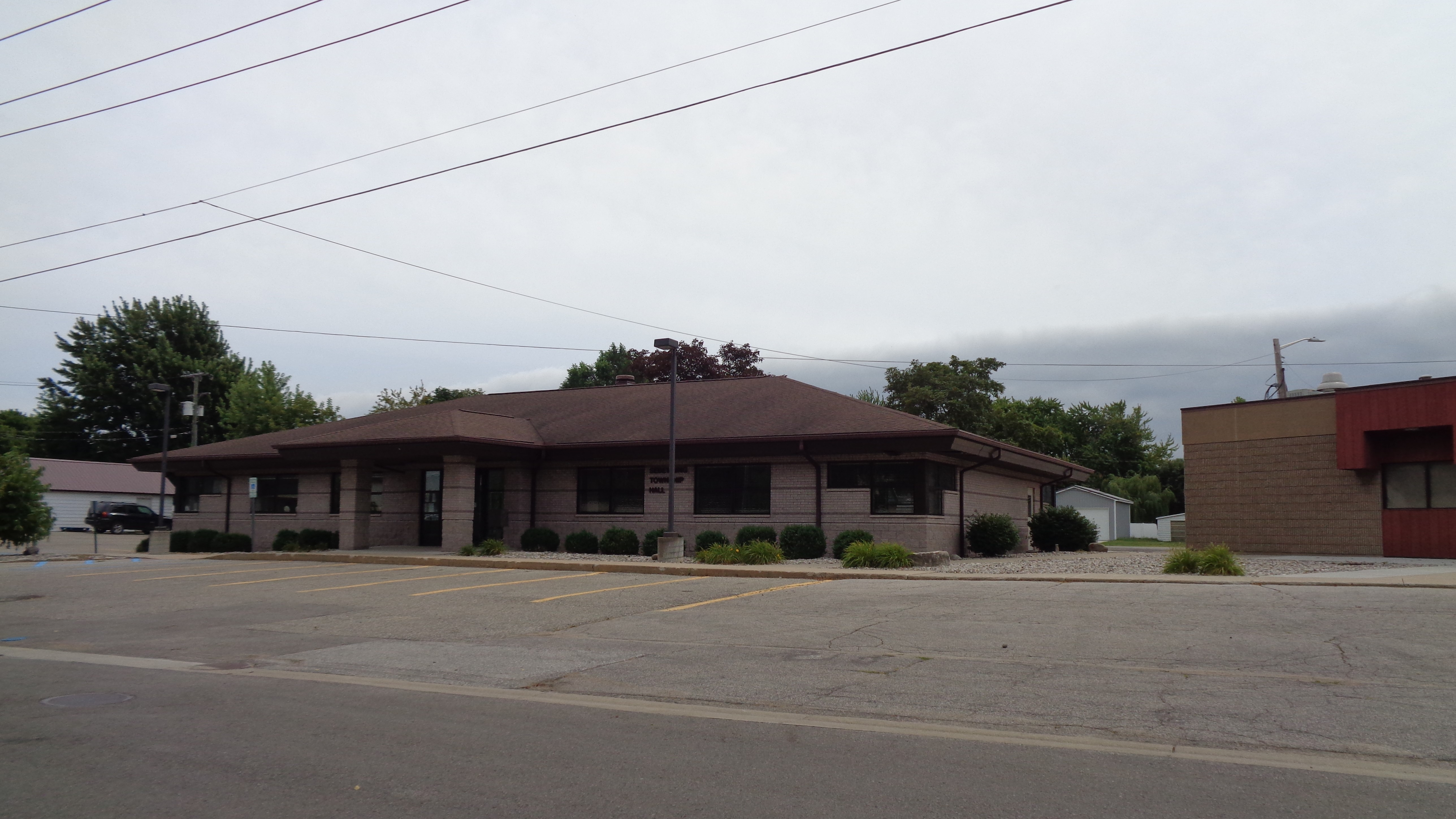
- Sebewaing Township Hall

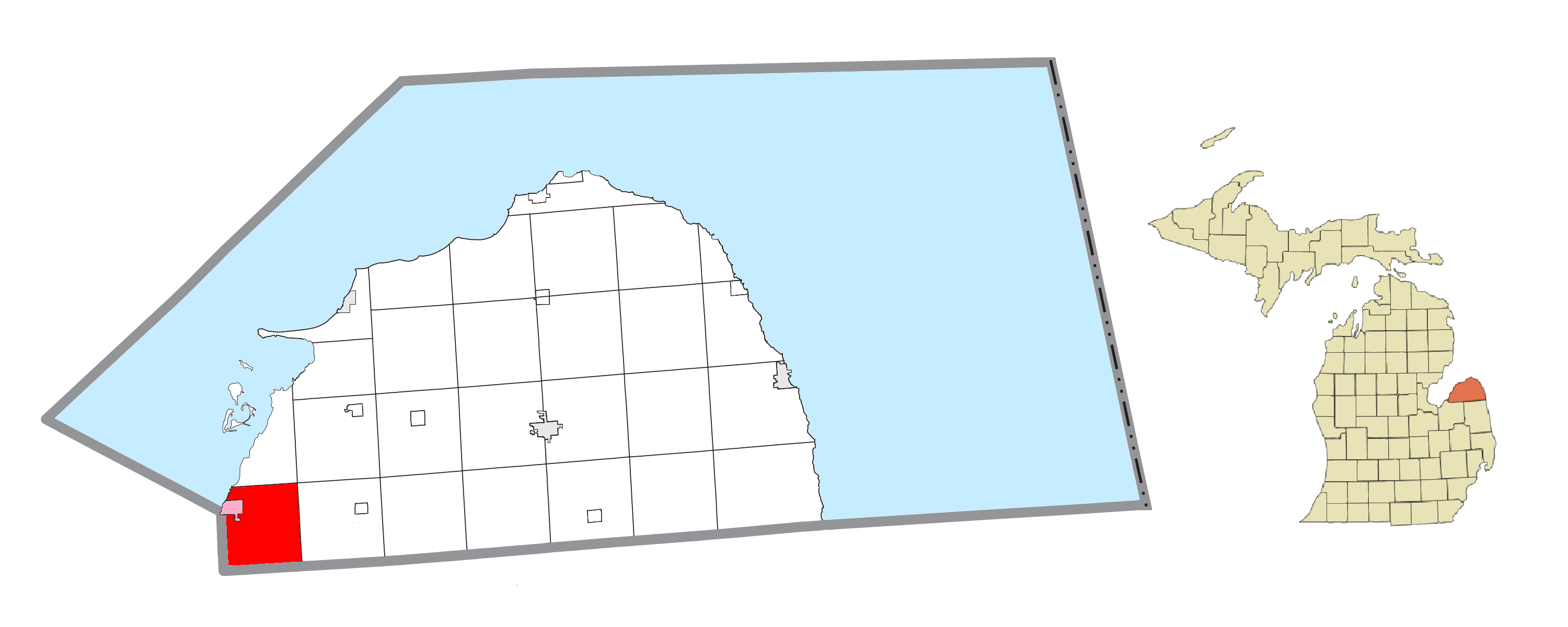
- Location within Huron County (red) and the administered village of Sebewaing (pink)

- Location within the state of Michigan Sebewaing Township (the United States)
- Coordinates: 43°43′35″N 83°26′12″W
- Country: United States
- State: Michigan
- County: Huron
- Organized: 1853

Area
  - Total: 32.8 sq mi (85.0 km^{2})
  - Land: 32.6 sq mi (84.4 km^{2})
  - Water: 0.23 sq mi (0.6 km^{2})
- Elevation: 614 ft (187 m)

Population (2020)
  - Total: 2,678
  - Density: 82.2/sq mi (31.7/km^{2})
- Time zone: UTC-5 (Eastern (EST))
  - Summer (DST): UTC-4 (EDT)
- ZIP code(s): 48759
- Area code: 989
- FIPS code: 26-72200
- GNIS feature ID: 1627055

Sebewaing Township is a civil township of Huron County in the U.S. state of Michigan. The population was 2,678 at the 2020 census, which ranks it as the most populous township in the county. The village of Sebewaing is located within the township. The township was organized in 1853.

== Communities ==
- The Village of Sebewaing is within the township.
- Bach is an unincorporated community on the Township's border with Brookfield Township at Bach and Bay Port Roads 43°40′59″N 83°21′21″W with side streets (Liken and Bartholomy) in Sebewaing.
- Kilmanagh is an unincorporated community partially in the northeast corner of the township at 43°45′22″N 83°21′25″W.

== Geography ==
According to the United States Census Bureau, the township has a total area of 32.8 square miles (85 km^{2}), of which 32.6 square miles (84 km^{2}) is land and 0.2 square miles (0.52 km^{2}) (0.70%) is water. Its name derives from the Ojibwe word ziibiiweng meaning "by the stream."

== Demographics ==
As of the census of 2000, there were 2,944 people, 1,252 households, and 832 families residing in the township. The population density was 90.3 inhabitants per square mile (34.9/km^{2}). There were 1,351 housing units at an average density of 41.4 per square mile (16.0/km^{2}). The racial makeup of the township was 98.61% White, 0.07% African American, 0.24% Native American, 0.14% Asian, 0.48% from other races, and 0.48% from two or more races. Hispanic or Latino of any race were 3.16% of the population.

There were 1,252 households, out of which 27.7% had children under the age of 18 living with them, 56.0% were married couples living together, 6.9% had a female householder with no husband present, and 33.5% were non-families. 31.2% of all households were made up of individuals, and 17.2% had someone living alone who was 65 years of age or older. The average household size was 2.35 and the average family size was 2.94.

In the township the population was spread out, with 23.5% under the age of 18, 7.3% from 18 to 24, 26.1% from 25 to 44, 24.8% from 45 to 64, and 18.4% who were 65 years of age or older. The median age was 41 years. For every 100 females, there were 90.8 males. For every 100 females age 18 and over, there were 91.0 males.

The median income for a household in the township was $34,275, and the median income for a family was $42,383. Males had a median income of $31,882 versus $24,444 for females. The per capita income for the township was $17,787. About 11.4% of families and 13.9% of the population were below the poverty line, including 24.0% of those under age 18 and 8.5% of those age 65 or over.
