= Kilmanagh, Michigan =

- Unincorporated community
- Location within the state of Michigan Kilmanagh (the United States)
- Coordinates: 43°45′22″N 83°21′25″W
- Country: United States
- State: Michigan
- County: Huron
- Townships: Brookfield, Fairhaven, Sebewaing, Winsor
- Elevation: 614 ft (187 m)
- Time zone: UTC-5 (Eastern (EST))
  - Summer (DST): UTC-4 (EDT)
- ZIP code(s): 48759
- Area code: 989
- GNIS feature ID: 629666

Kilmanagh is an unincorporated community in Huron County in the U.S. state of Michigan. The community is situated at 43°45′22″N 83°21′25″W. at the corners of four townships:

- Brookfield Township (southeast corner)
- Sebewaing Township (southwest corner)
- Fairhaven Township (northwest corner)
- Winsor Township (northeast corner)

== History ==
Kilmanagh was first called Thompson's Corners, for Francis Thompson, an Irish homesteader who arrived in 1861. The name Kilmanagh was first used to describe the nearby Shebeon Creek, which would overflow each spring. A post office named Kilmanagh operated from February 1873 until June 1904.

== Government ==
School District serving the community are Elkton-Pigeon-Bay Port Schools and Owendale-Gagetown Area Schools. The community is served by the Sebewaing based Post Office, Zip Code 48759.

District	Number	Officeholder
U.S. Representative	10	Candice Miller
State Senate	31	Mike Green
State Representative	84	
County Commissioner		
