= Lakeport State Park =

Park in Michigan, USA

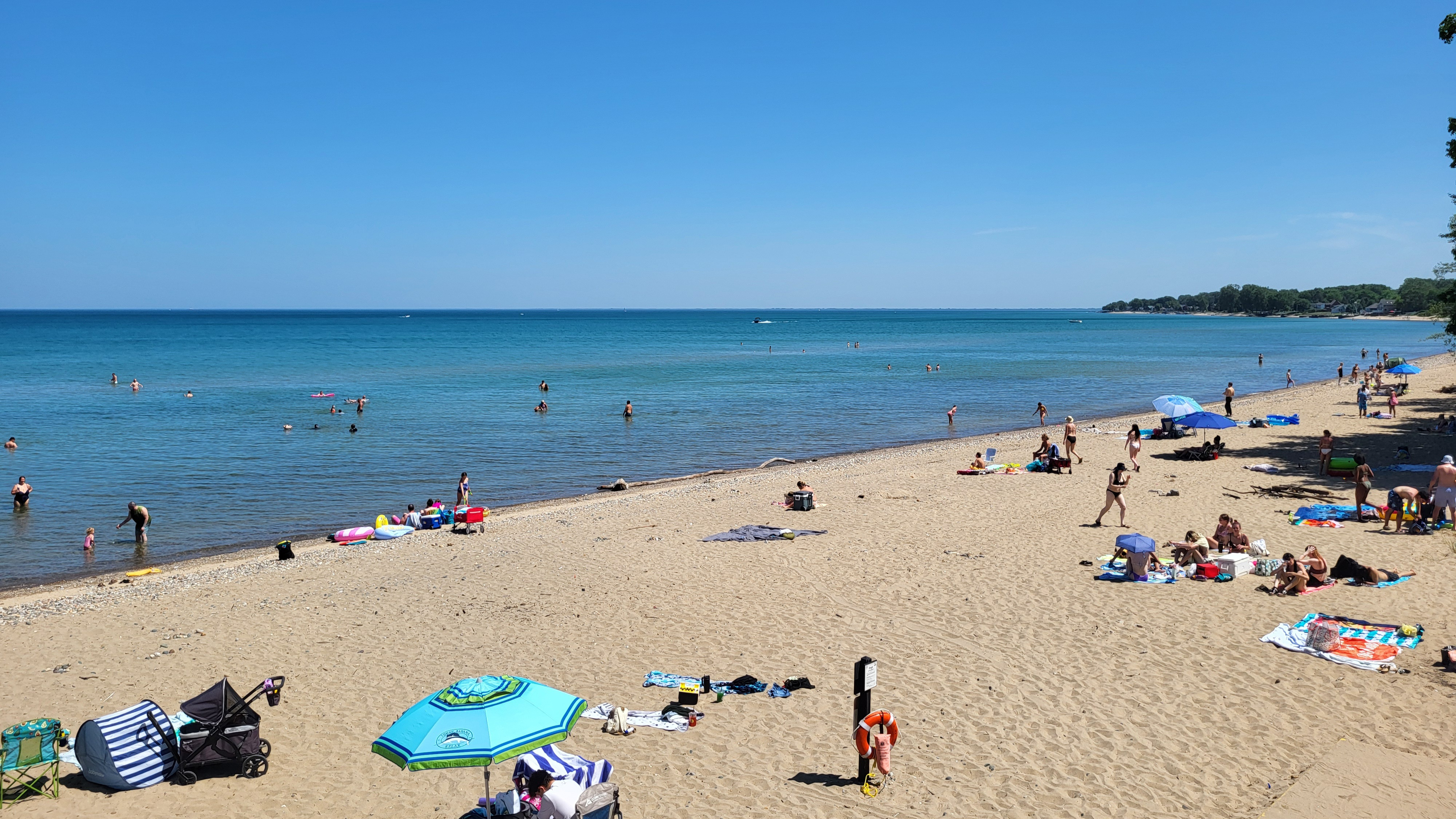
- Beachfront along the day-use area

- Location within Michigan Location within the United States
- Location: Burtchville Township, St. Clair County, Michigan, United States
- Nearest city: Port Huron, Michigan
- Coordinates: 43°07′24″N 82°29′45″W
- Area: 565 acres (229 ha)
- Elevation: 600 feet (180 m)
- Established: 1938
- Administrator: Michigan Department of Natural Resources
- Designation: Michigan state park
- Website: Official website

Lakeport State Park is a public recreation area on the shores of Lake Huron in St. Clair County, Michigan. The state park consists of two units on either side of the community of Lakeport within Burtchville Township. Two campgrounds, beachfront, and camp store are on the north side, and a picnic area and beachfront are on the south side.

== History ==
Lakeport State Park was established in 1938 as Port Huron State Park within one mile of the existing Saint Clair (County) State Park (now Burtchville Township Park) north of Lakeport. Land acquisition continued into the 1940s and after a 1946 appropriation of $85,000 for initial improvements, the park (today's North Unit) was officially opened to users in 1947 as Lakeport State Park. (Saint Clair State Park was turned over to Saint Clair County in 1946 due to its proximity to the new state park less than a mile to the south and its small, 17-acre size.) The South Unit was formerly a United Auto Workers retreat, where in 1962, the Port Huron Statement was completed and announced. Approval by the State Conservation Commission to acquire the 200-acre tract for $250,000 was approved on December 3, 1965, with a transfer date for the Michigan DNR to take control of the land the following June 15.

== Activities and amenities ==
The park offers swimming, picnicking, playground, camp store, and campgrounds.
