= Sebewaing, Michigan =

- Village
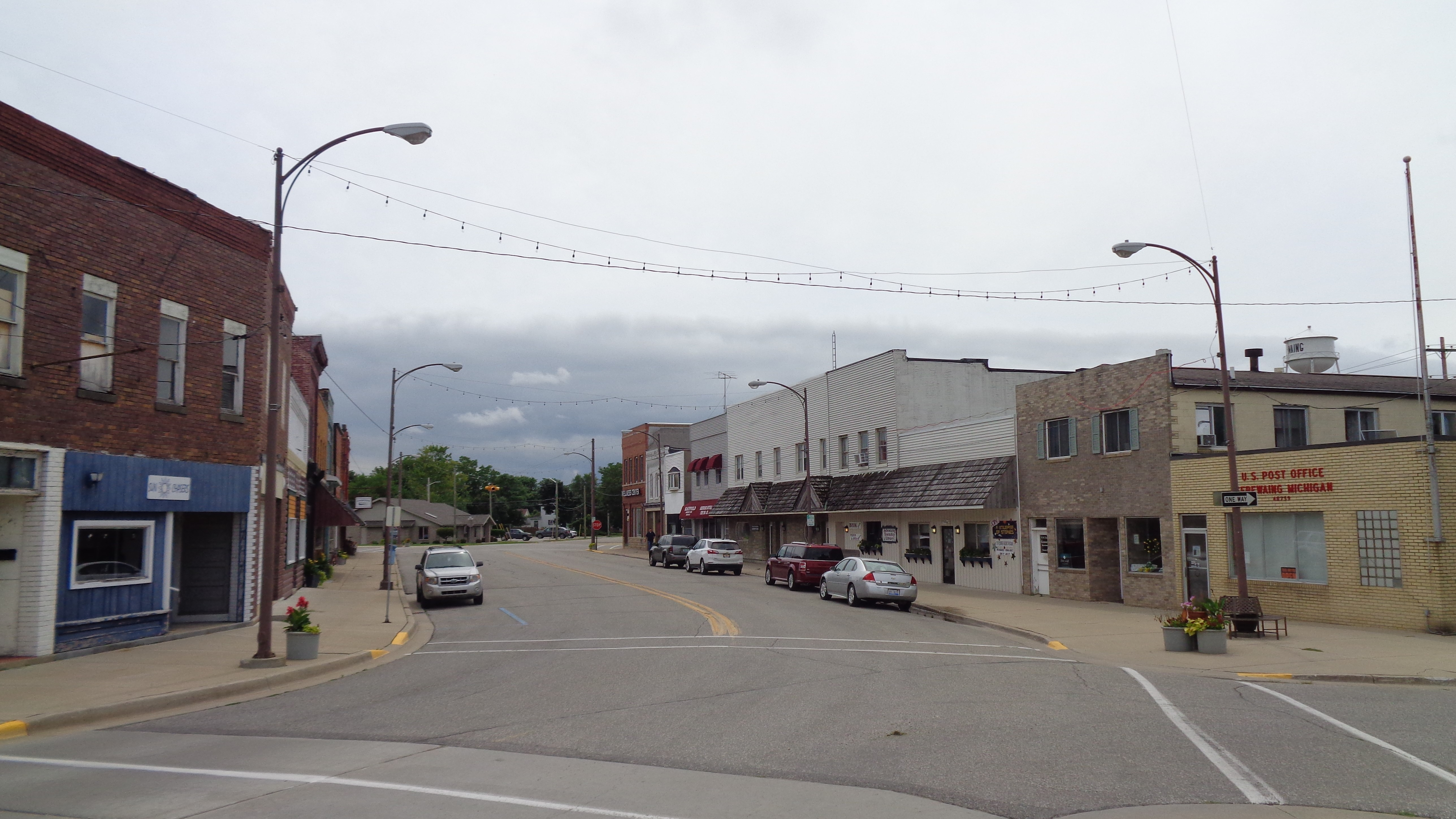
- Business district along Center Street

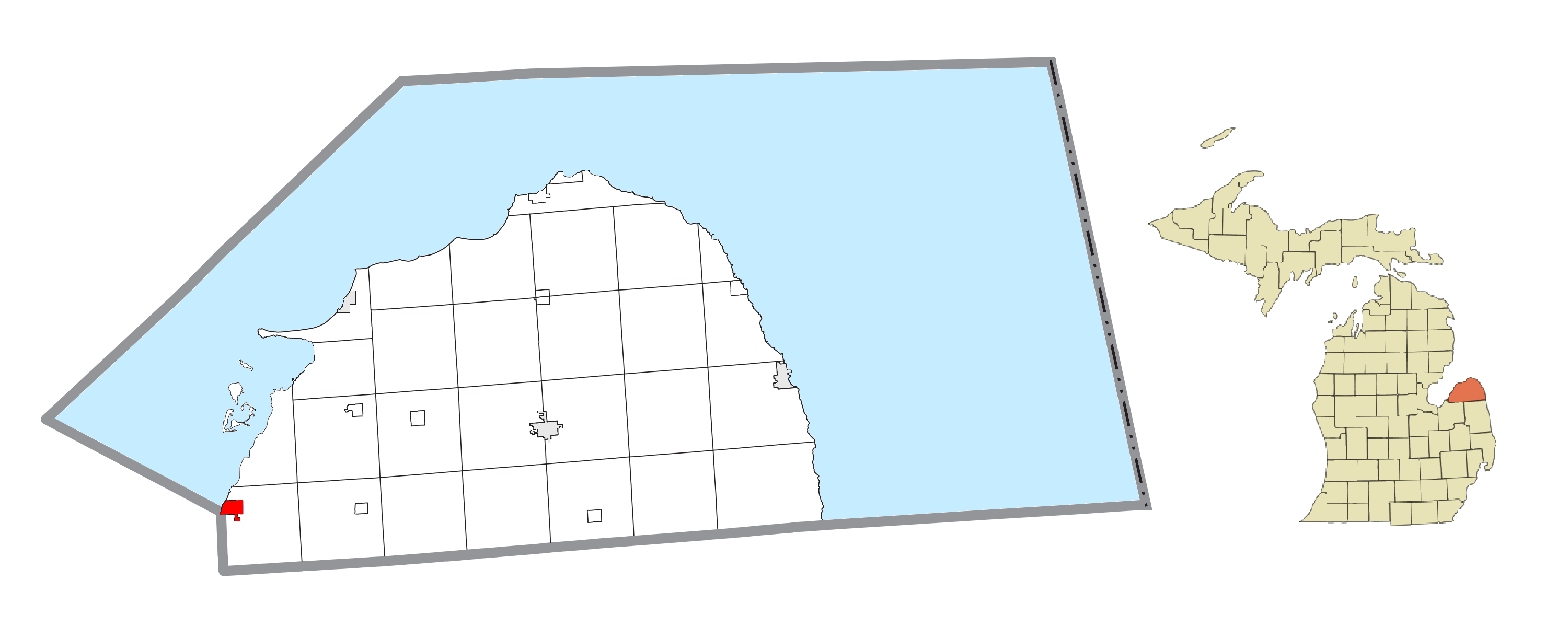
- Location within Huron County

- Location within the state of Michigan
- Coordinates: 43°43′56″N 83°26′54″W
- Country: United States
- State: Michigan
- County: Huron
- Township: Sebewaing
- Founded: 1845
- Incorporated: 1879 (village)

Government
  - Type: Village council
  - President: Julie Epperson

Area
  - Total: 1.71 sq mi (4.44 km^{2})
  - Land: 1.59 sq mi (4.12 km^{2})
  - Water: 0.12 sq mi (0.32 km^{2})
- Elevation: 584 ft (178 m)

Population (2020)
  - Total: 1,721
  - Density: 1,080/sq mi (418/km^{2})
- Time zone: UTC-5 (Eastern (EST))
  - Summer (DST): UTC-4 (EDT)
- ZIP code(s): 48759
- Area code: 989
- FIPS code: 26-72180
- GNIS feature ID: 0637513
- Website: Official website

Sebewaing (SEE-bah-wing) is a village in Huron County in the U.S. state of Michigan. The population was 1,721 at the 2020 census. The village is within Sebewaing Township. This community is known as the Sugar Beet Capital, due to the Michigan Sugar slicing mill located within the village and the yearly Michigan Sugar Festival. The Sebewaing area, the Thumb, and the state of Michigan overall are major beet sugar producers, mostly for domestic consumption. Sebewaing is also the first gigabit village in the state of Michigan. In 2014–15, Sebewaing completed its fiber to the home network, offering up to gigabit/second speeds over their fiber optic network.

== Geography ==
- According to the United States Census Bureau, the village has a total area of 1.71 square miles (4.43 km^{2}), of which 1.58 square miles (4.09 km^{2}) is land and 0.13 square miles (0.34 km^{2}) is water. It is said that the name Sebewaing derives from the Ojibwe word ziibiiweng meaning "place by the river," but there is no clear, early, documentation for this word or meaning. Perhaps, the name Sebewaing meant "river in the furriery or pelt country." That will come from the Chippewa or Ojibwe phrase "Zibii-wayaan-aki." The 18th century French called the Thumb of Michigan les Pays Peles meaning the land of pelts or furs, the pelt country. The Cass River to the south of Saginaw Bay in this same Upper Thumb region early on was called Onottoway-Sebewing. The Cass River with its headwaters in the upper Thumb of Michigan has its confluence or outlet into the Saginaw River that empties into the central part of Saginaw Bay. Wiscoggin Creek, whose outlet is into Saginaw Bay at today's Village of Unionville, Tuscola County, in Michigan's Upper Thumb, was in 1855 called Sebewaning River. Previously, a short distance away, the Sebewaing River, in today's Huron County, was called by the French Le Rivier du Fil meaning "the thread river." The mouth of the Thread River that today's is the Sebewaing River in Huron County is the location of the Village of Sebewaing. Here, the Sebewaing River pours out north into Saginaw Bay. Being on the banks of the river and bay shoreline, the village was certainly a place to weave strings or threads to make nets, fishing lines, snares, bow strings, necklaces, and dreamcatchers. Native American's often made string or thread from Willow trees that they planted along strategic rivers.

Sebewaing is considered to be part of the Thumb of Michigan, which in turn is a subregion of the Flint/Tri-Cities.

== History ==
Sebewaing's name was derived from the Algonquian language of Native Americans, the original inhabitants of the area. The village was founded in 1845 by Rev. John J.F. Auch, a Lutheran minister sent by the church to do missionary work in the Native American communities.

Beginning in the mid-19th century, the town was settled by many migrants of German ancestry. In 1880 the E.O. Braendle Brewery began operations. The brewing operation was forced to close during Prohibition, but in 1927 it was renamed, and the Sebewaing Brewing Company brewed many types of German-style beer in the town until 1965. The defunct Michigan Brewing company in Webberville, Michigan resurrected some of the brands, using authentic formulae and labels.

== Demographics ==
Historical population
Census	Pop.	Note	%±
1880	553		—
1890	719		30.0%
1900	1,243		72.9%
1910	1,347		8.4%
1920	1,446		7.3%
1930	1,441		−0.3%
1940	1,598		10.9%
1950	1,911		19.6%
1960	2,026		6.0%
1970	2,053		1.3%
1980	2,046		−0.3%
1990	1,923		−6.0%
2000	1,974		2.7%
2010	1,759		−10.9%
2020	1,721		−2.2%
U.S. Decennial Census

=== 2020 census ===
As of the 2020 census, Sebewaing had a population of 1,721. The median age was 47.5 years. 18.9% of residents were under the age of 18 and 25.2% of residents were 65 years of age or older. For every 100 females there were 93.8 males, and for every 100 females age 18 and over there were 94.2 males age 18 and over.

0.0% of residents lived in urban areas, while 100.0% lived in rural areas.

There were 818 households in Sebewaing, of which 23.6% had children under the age of 18 living in them. Of all households, 40.5% were married-couple households, 22.9% were households with a male householder and no spouse or partner present, and 29.3% were households with a female householder and no spouse or partner present. About 37.6% of all households were made up of individuals and 19.7% had someone living alone who was 65 years of age or older.

There were 920 housing units, of which 11.1% were vacant. The homeowner vacancy rate was 2.1% and the rental vacancy rate was 11.4%.

Racial composition as of the 2020 census
Race	Number	Percent
White	1,608	93.4%
Black or African American	2	0.1%
American Indian and Alaska Native	6	0.3%
Asian	6	0.3%
Native Hawaiian and Other Pacific Islander	0	0.0%
Some other race	25	1.5%
Two or more races	74	4.3%
Hispanic or Latino (of any race)	67	3.9%

=== 2010 census ===
As of the census of 2010, there were 1,759 people, 802 households, and 491 families residing in the village. The population density was 1,113.3 inhabitants per square mile (429.8/km^{2}). There were 917 housing units at an average density of 580.4 per square mile (224.1/km^{2}). The racial makeup of the village was 97.5% White, 0.2% Native American, 0.2% Asian, 1.3% from other races, and 0.9% from two or more races. Hispanic or Latino of any race were 4.3% of the population.

There were 802 households, of which 26.2% had children under the age of 18 living with them, 46.8% were married couples living together, 10.0% had a female householder with no husband present, 4.5% had a male householder with no wife present, and 38.8% were non-families. 33.7% of all households were made up of individuals, and 16.7% had someone living alone who was 65 years of age or older. The average household size was 2.19 and the average family size was 2.79.

The median age in the village was 44.9 years. 20.8% of residents were under the age of 18; 7% were between the ages of 18 and 24; 22.4% were from 25 to 44; 29.1% were from 45 to 64; and 20.8% were 65 years of age or older. The gender makeup of the village was 49.2% male and 50.8% female.

=== 2000 census ===
As of the census of 2000, there were 1,974 people, 868 households, and 547 families residing in the village. The population density was 1,232.4 inhabitants per square mile (475.8/km^{2}). There were 946 housing units at an average density of 590.6 per square mile (228.0/km^{2}). The racial makeup of the village was 98.99% White, 0.10% African American, 0.35% Native American, 0.10% Asian, 0.25% from other races, and 0.20% from two or more races. Hispanic or Latino of any race were 3.34% of the population.

There were 868 households, of which 26.7% had children under the age of 18 living with them, 50.9% were married couples living together, 7.9% had a female householder with no husband present, and 36.9% were non-families. 34.2% of all households were made up of individuals, and 19.0% had someone living alone who was 65 years of age or older. The average household size was 2.27 and the average family size was 2.91.

In the village, the population was spread out, with 22.9% under the age of 18, 7.5% from 18 to 24, 26.3% from 25 to 44, 24.8% from 45 to 64, and 18.4% who were 65 years of age or older. The median age was 41 years. For every 100 females, there were 90.0 males. For every 100 females age 18 and over, there were 87.8 males.

The median income for a household in the village was $32,721, and the median income for a family was $40,742. Males had a median income of $31,619 versus $23,125 for females. The per capita income for the village was $16,894. About 13.6% of families and 17.5% of the population were below the poverty line, including 32.7% of those under age 18 and 9.7% of those age 65 or over.

== Climate ==
This climatic region has large seasonal temperature differences, with warm to hot (and often humid) summers and cold (sometimes severely cold) winters. According to the Köppen Climate Classification system, Sebewaing has a humid continental climate, abbreviated "Dfb" on climate maps.

== Education ==
The village is served by Unionville-Sebewaing Area Schools. Unionville-Sebewaing Area High School was formed by the merger of Unionville and Sebewaing High Schools. The nearest tertiary educational institutions are located in Cass City to the east and Bay City to the west.

== Notable people ==
- George W. Auch, businessman and Chicago city alderman
