= Fairhaven Township, Michigan =

- Civil township
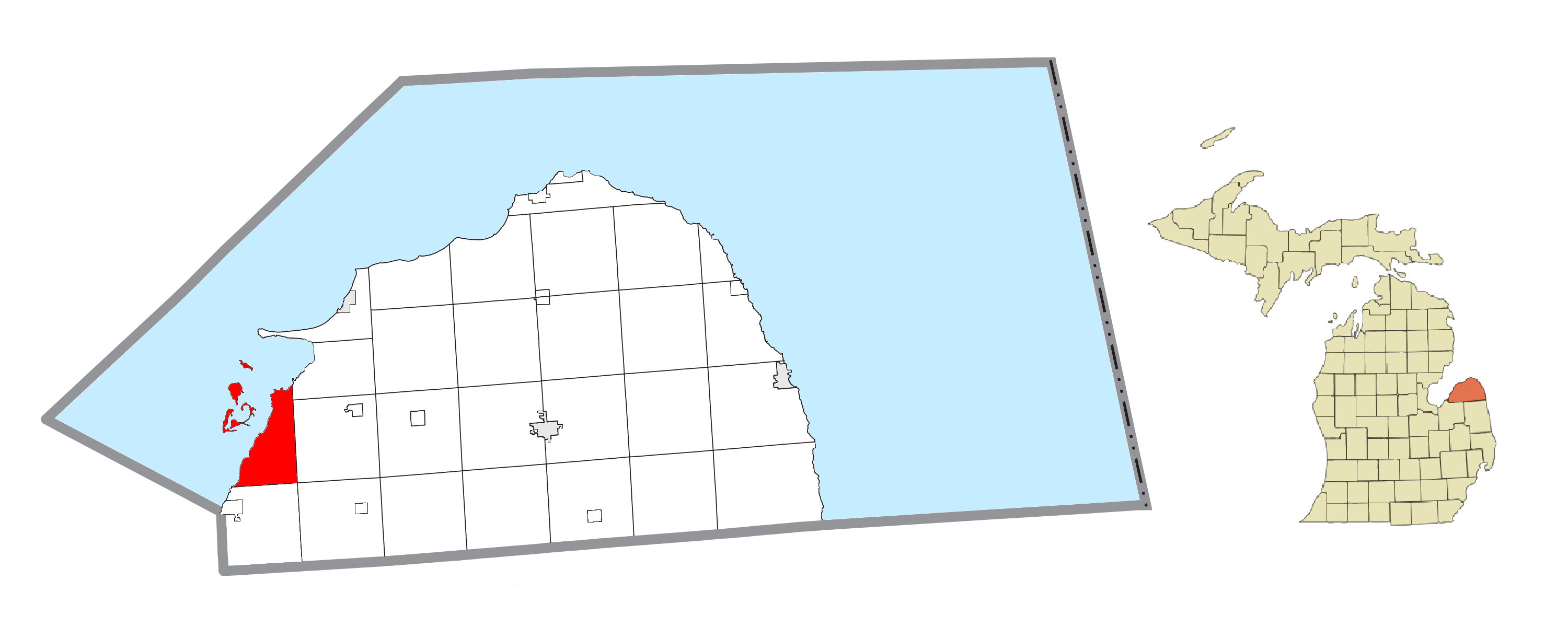
- Location within Huron County

- Location within the state of Michigan Fairhaven Township (the United States)
- Coordinates: 43°48′30″N 83°24′09″W
- Country: United States
- State: Michigan
- County: Huron

Area
  - Total: 58.0 sq mi (150.3 km^{2})
  - Land: 21.1 sq mi (54.6 km^{2})
  - Water: 36.9 sq mi (95.7 km^{2})
- Elevation: 581 ft (177 m)

Population (2020)
  - Total: 1,081
  - Density: 51.3/sq mi (19.8/km^{2})
- Time zone: UTC-5 (Eastern (EST))
  - Summer (DST): UTC-4 (EDT)
- ZIP code(s): 48720, 48759
- Area code: 989
- FIPS code: 26-27120
- GNIS feature ID: 1626266
- Website: https://www.fairhaventownship.com/

Fairhaven Township is a civil township of Huron County in the U.S. state of Michigan. The population was 1,081 at the 2020 census.

== Communities ==
- Bay Port is an unincorporated community in the township on M-25 on the shore of Wild Fowl Bay, which opens into the Saginaw Bay of Lake Huron. Bay Port is at 43°50′58″N 83°22′24″W. The ZIP code is 48720.
- Kilmanagh is an unincorporated community partially in the southeast corner of the township at 43°45′22″N 83°21′25″W.
- Rose Island is an unincorporated community in the Township on Saginaw Bay at Rose Island and Haist roads.43°46′58″N 83°25′53″W
- Valley Island is an unincorporated community in the Township on Saginaw Bay at Schuch and Valley Island roads.43°47′32″N 83°25′41″W
- Weale is an unincorporated community in the Township on Saginaw Bay at Weale and Kuhl roads, after the railroad. 43°48′43″N 83°23′50″W

== Geography ==
According to the United States Census Bureau, the township has a total area of 58.0 square miles (150 km^{2}), of which 21.1 square miles (55 km^{2}) is land and 37.0 square miles (96 km^{2}) (63.67%) is water.

Fairhaven Township also contains several uninhabited islands in Saginaw Bay, which are mostly contained within Wildfowl Bay State Wildlife Area. These islands include Defoe Island, Duck Island, Heisterman Island, Lone Tree Island, North Island, Maisou Island, Middle Grounds Island, and Pitchers Reef.

== Demographics ==
As of the census of 2000, there were 1,259 people, 537 households, and 353 families residing in the township. The population density was 59.7 inhabitants per square mile (23.1/km^{2}). There were 770 housing units at an average density of 36.5 per square mile (14.1/km^{2}). The racial makeup of the township was 98.17% White, 0.32% Native American, 0.24% Asian, 0.79% from other races, and 0.48% from two or more races. Hispanic or Latino of any race were 2.14% of the population.

There were 537 households, out of which 29.6% had children under the age of 18 living with them, 52.9% were married couples living together, 9.9% had a female householder with no husband present, and 34.1% were non-families. 30.4% of all households were made up of individuals, and 11.7% had someone living alone who was 65 years of age or older. The average household size was 2.33 and the average family size was 2.90.

In the township the population was spread out, with 23.7% under the age of 18, 7.2% from 18 to 24, 28.1% from 25 to 44, 24.9% from 45 to 64, and 16.0% who were 65 years of age or older. The median age was 40 years. For every 100 females, there were 102.1 males. For every 100 females age 18 and over, there were 101.9 males.

The median income for a household in the township was $33,500, and the median income for a family was $37,813. Males had a median income of $31,958 versus $20,313 for females. The per capita income for the township was $16,689. About 8.6% of families and 11.0% of the population were below the poverty line, including 9.9% of those under age 18 and 13.2% of those age 65 or over.
