= Vicki Keith =

Canadian swimmer (born 1961)

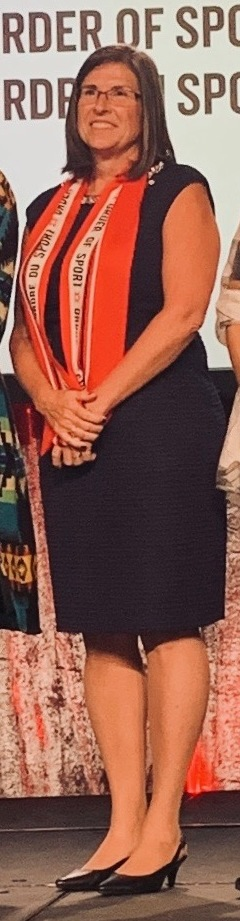
- Vicki Keith at the Inaugural Order of Sport Awards in Toronto

Personal information
- Nickname: Lady of the Lakes
- Born: February 26, 1961 (age 65) Winnipeg, Manitoba
- Spouse: John Munro
- Website: vickikeith.wordpress.com

Sport
- Sport: Swimming
- Strokes: Front crawl, Butterfly
- Club: Y Penguins

Dr. Vicki Keith Munro, CM, O.Ont, LLD, ChPC (born 26 February 1961 in Winnipeg, Manitoba) is a Canadian retired marathon swimmer, coach and advocate for disabled athletes. Her accomplishments include the first crossing of all five Great Lakes, a 100-hour swim and the world record distance of 80.2 kilometers swum using the butterfly stroke. Many people consider Keith as the face of marathon swimming.

== Swimming achievements ==
Keith has accomplished numerous achievements in the sport of swimming, with most relating to open water swimming and extreme endurance. At one point, she held sixteen world records.

Keith once said "I promised myself when I first got into marathon swimming that everything I'd do would be a first".

=== Lake Ontario North to South crossing ===
On 15 August 1986, Keith swam across Lake Ontario, from the North of the lake at the end of Leslie Street Spit (now known as Vicki Keith point), to the South of the lake at Port Dalhousie. This crossing took her 26 hours and 59 minutes and the total distance was 45.8 kilometers.

=== First Lake Ontario two-way crossing ===
On 7 August 1987, Keith was the first person to complete a 95 kilometer two-way crossing of Lake Ontario, which she completed in 56 hours and 10 minutes.

=== First crossing of the five great lakes ===
In only a sixty-one day period from 2 July to 30 August 1988, Keith was the first person to swim all of the five great lakes and managed to raise $548,000 for Variety Club while doing it.

Lake Erie was the first of the five great lakes successfully crossed. On 2 July at 6:06 pm, Keith swam from Port Colborne, Ontario to Sturgeon Point, New York - a distance of 26 kilometers which she swam in 10 hours and 24 minutes.

Next, on 19 July, Keith crossed the much larger Lake Huron. She departed from Harbor Beach, Michigan at 7 a.m. on Sunday 17 July. She then swam through the rest of the Sunday and the whole of the Monday, then finally arrived at Goderich, Ontario at 5:55 a.m. on Tuesday 19 July. Upon reaching her destination, she was greeted by a cheering crowd of 400 people and finished the swim off with half a mile of her "trademark" butterfly stroke, from the breakwall to the beach. The total distance of the swim was 75 kilometers, which she swam in 46 hours and 55 minutes.

On 28 July, Keith embarked on her next Great Lake swim, a 72 kilometer crossing of Lake Michigan from Union Pier, Michigan to Chicago, Illinois. Despite being 3 kilometers shorter than the Lake Huron crossing, it took Keith 5 hours and 5 minutes longer at 52 hours and 45 minutes.

On 15 August, Keith crossed Lake Superior from Orienta, Wisconsin to Two Harbors, Minnesota. The crossing was 32 kilometers long and took Keith 17 hours to complete.

Finally, on August 30, Keith crossed Lake Ontario to complete the 5 great lakes in only sixty-one days. She swam 44.2 kilometers from the Niagara River mouth to the end of Leslie Street Spit (now known as Vicki Keith point).

=== English Channel butterfly crossing ===
On 10 July 1989, Vicki Keith became the first person to swim the 33 kilometers across the English Channel using the butterfly stroke, in 24 hours and 44 minutes. She swam from England to France. Following this feat, the Channel Swimming Association awarded Keith the "Most Meritous Swim" and "Fastest Butterfly Swim" awards. Her record time only was beaten 13 years later by Dr Julie Bradshaw MBE who crossed the channel in 14 hours and 18 minutes. Keith said following the swim "It wasn't enough for me to just swim the English Channel the way everyone else has.", and hence, she completed the swim using the butterfly stroke.

=== Strait of Juan de Fuca butterfly crossing ===
On 10 August 1989, Keith swam 29.4 kilometers of butterfly to cross the Strait of Juan de Fuca, from Ediz Hook, Port Angeles, Washington to Victoria, British Columbia in 14 hours and 1 minute. She was the first in 33 years to swim across the strait, and the first ever to do it using the butterfly stroke. During the swim, she was carried 4 kilometers westward by the currents, but was then carried back eastward again.

=== Lake Ontario butterfly crossing ===
On 4 September 1989, Keith swam across Lake Ontario using only the butterfly stroke. The swim was 49 kilometers long from the Niagara River mouth to the West waterfront of Toronto, and was completed in 31 hours.

=== Catalina Channel butterfly crossing ===
After her first unsuccessful attempt earlier in the summer of 1989 where she was forced to withdraw due to jet lag, on 23 September 1989 01:33, Keith swam across the 32.3 kilometer long Catalina Channel from Santa Catalina Island (California) to Cabrillo Beach using the butterfly stroke. 8 hours into the swim, Keith had swum 9.6 miles despite swimming through 2 foot swells, putting her far ahead of her schedule to complete the swim in 20 hours. Keith completed the swim at 16:26 on the same day, finishing with a time of 14 hours, 53 minutes and 26 seconds. Upon completion of the swim, she said "My arms are a little bit sore and there's some cramping in the muscles underneath my shoulders, but I'll live through it". Her swim raised money once again for Variety children's charities. Her support boat was named the "cold spaghetti".

=== Lake Ontario swim ===
On 25 August 2001, Keith swam 35 kilometers across Lake Ontario from Point Peninsula, New York to MacDonald Park, Kingston, Ontario. This swim took her 18 hours and 48 minutes.

=== Lake Ontario shoreline butterfly swim ===
On 5 August 2005 at 44 years old, Vicki Keith came out of swimming retirement due to wanting to raise money for the Kingston YMCA to provide more opportunities to children with disabilities. She attempted an 84 kilometer butterfly swim from Oswego, New York to Kingston, Ontario. However, she was unable to complete this swim due to high winds causing over three-meter tall waves that halted her progression to only one kilometer per hour. If she had continued at this rate, rather than the planned 48 hours, the swim would have taken approximately 78 hours given that she had no other issues.

Despite this failed attempt, only two weeks later on 17 August 2005, Keith attempted another over 80 kilometer butterfly swim (74 kilometers in a straight line). This time, her route was a shore line swim from Point Petre, Ontario to Lake Ontario Park via Amherst Island, and was once again predicted to take around 48 hours. During the swim, Keith battled through strong winds, high waves, currents, cold temperatures and hallucinations. The Ontario Sports Hall of Fame says "she pushed beyond what most believed feasible to accomplish her goal". She was rewarded for her resilience, as she completed the 80.2 kilometer swim in 63 hours and 44 minutes. This was a new world record for the longest distance swum with the butterfly stroke, and a second world record for the longest duration of an open water swim.

== Coaching ==
Throughout her life, Keith has volunteered to coach in many areas. She has coached marathon swimmers, triathletes and track and field athletes. However, she is most known for her coaching of people with disabilities. Vicki Keith began her coaching career as an assistant coach at the Kingston Blue Marlins swim club.

=== Coaching achievements ===
Keith has coached 6 athletes to world records in marathon swimming:

- Carlos Costa, a double leg amputee who became the first disabled swimmer to cross Lake Ontario.
- Ashley Cowan, a quadruple amputee who swam across Lake Erie.
- Terri Lynn Langdon, a swimmer with cerebral palsy who set a speed record for swimming across Lake Erie.
- Jenna Lambert, who became the first female swimmer to swim across Lake Ontario at the age of 15.
- Natalie Lambert (Jenna Lambert's younger sister), who was the youngest person to swim across Lake Ontario and Lake Erie.
- John Munro (Keith's husband), who became the oldest person to swim across Lake Ontario and Lake Erie.

In swimming, Keith has coached 24 athletes with a disability to National level, and 4 to an international level.

She has been selected to be on the coaching staff of 3 World Para Swimming Championships and once at the Parapan American Games.

She is recognized by the Coaching Association of Canada as a Chartered Professional Coach (ChPC).

She has received an Honorary Doctorate from Queen's University, Kingston.

She coached several Y Penguins swim club members to international fame, including Chris Sergeant-Tsonos to multiple World Para Swimming Championships, and a Canadian record and Abi Tripp to silver and bronze medals in the Commonwealth Games, a bronze medal in the World Para Swimming Championships, several Canadian records and other international competition finals.

== Charity work ==
In addition to her volunteer coaching throughout the years, Keith has been heavily involved in raising money for charity and committing her time to helping people. Over her lifetime, Keith has raised over a million Canadian dollars for charity projects worldwide.

=== Early volunteer work ===
At 10 years old, she was involved with helping a young boy with a disability in the YMCA at Ottawa.

=== Variety Club ===
Keith has been heavily involved in raising money for, and running Variety Club projects. In 1988, as a fundraiser for her 61-day period crossings of the great lakes, she raised $548,000 for the Variety Village Sunshine Pool. A year later in 1989, she raised a further $200,000 for variety projects. Keith was at one point on the Variety Village board of directors.

=== Kingston YMCA ===
In 2006, Keith came out of swimming retirement to raise money to provide better opportunities for children with disabilities. She subsequently completed an 80.2 kilometer swim around Lake Ontario, and raised $260,000 for the Kingston YMCA.

=== Ontario Place ===
Keith has been on the Board of Directors of Ontario Place.

== Awards and honours ==
Vicki Keith has been the recipient of over 41 awards and honours, including inductions into Halls of Fame, awards, plaques and national and provincial orders.

=== Plaques ===
Keith has had four plaques erected in her honour. Two plaques commemorate her 75 kilometer crossing of Lake Huron, which are located at Harbor Beach, Michigan and Goderich, Ontario. A further plaque containing a poem commemorating her crossing of Lake Huron was originally also located in Goderich, however this plaque no longer exists. The final plaque, located at the end of Leslie Street Spit, named its location "Vicki Keith point" and commemorates her Lake Ontario swims and fund raising efforts.

==== Vicki Keith Point plaque ====
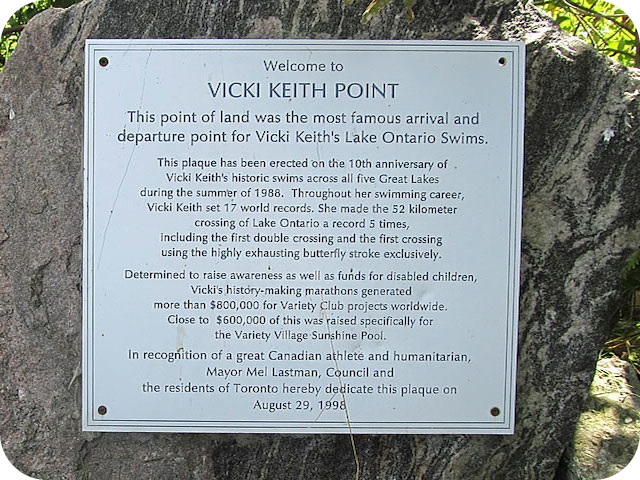
Plaque at Vicki Keith Point

Ever since Leslie Street Spit was constructed as a landfill, Vicki Keith commonly used the end of the Leslie Street Spit as a starting and finishing point when swimming across Lake Ontario rather than the traditional finishing point of Marilyn Bell Park. Therefore, on the 10th anniversary of Keith's "historic" great lakes swims, on the 29 August 1998, the mayor of Toronto, the council and local residents erected a plaque in honour of Keith. The plaque named the point "Vicki Keith Point", and hence the end of the Leslie Street Spit has been referred to as Vicki Keith Point ever since.

The plaque celebrated Keith's great lakes swims, and specifically her record breaking 5 swim crossings of Lake Ontario, including the two-way crossing, and crossing using the "exhausting" butterfly stroke. Following on, the plaque mentions Keith raising $800,000 for Variety Club projects, including close to $600,000 going towards the Variety Village Sunshine Pool.

===== Goderich Beach plaque =====
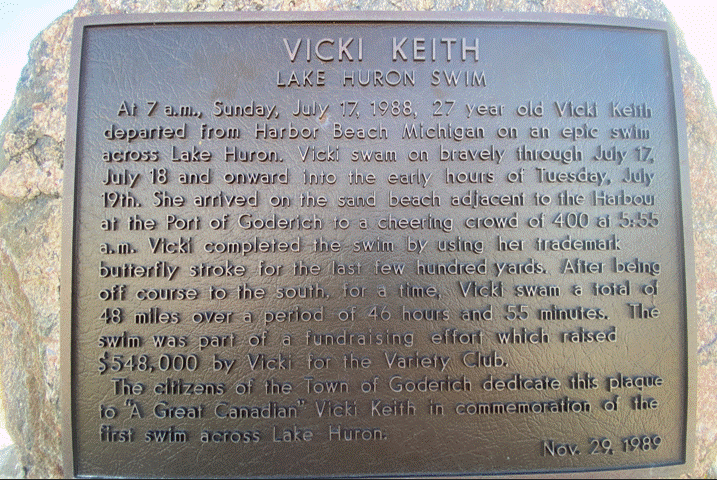
Vicki Keith Goderich Beach Plaque

The first plaque erected to commemorate Keith's Lake Huron swim was placed on November 29, 1989, adjacent to the South side of the boardwalk overlooking where Keith finished her Lake Huron swim, at 270 Harbor Street, Goderich, Ontario. The plaque tells the story of Keith's "epic" Lake Huron swim, and describes Keith as "bravely" swimming through the days, and that there was a crowd of 400 people cheering her in as she finished the last few hundred yards with her "trademark" butterfly stroke. The plaque is made of brass, is 61 cm wide and 46 cm high. The concrete stand it is mounted on is 30.5 cm high, 1.22 m wide and 1.22 m thick. The text on the plaque is written in upper and lower case. The main text is 1.3 cm high and left justified, while the headings are central standing at 2.2 cm high for the heading "VICKI KEITH" and 1.3 cm high for the heading "LAKE HURON SWIM".

==== Goderich Beach poem plaque ====
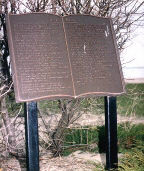
Poem plaque at Goderich Beach commemorating Vicki Keith

To the right of the Goderich Beach plaque, a separate brass plaque was originally erected, containing a poem titled "Vicki Keith" by Mary Sutherland (a member of the supporting crew for Vicki Keith's Lake Huron swim). The plaque formed the shape of an open book, with 7 verses of the poem on the left, and 6 verses on the right. Hence, the poem contained a total of 13 verses, with each verse 4 lines long. Similarly to the plaque next to it, it celebrated Keith's great lakes crossings, the crossing of Lake Huron and her fundraising efforts.

==== Harbor beach plaque ====
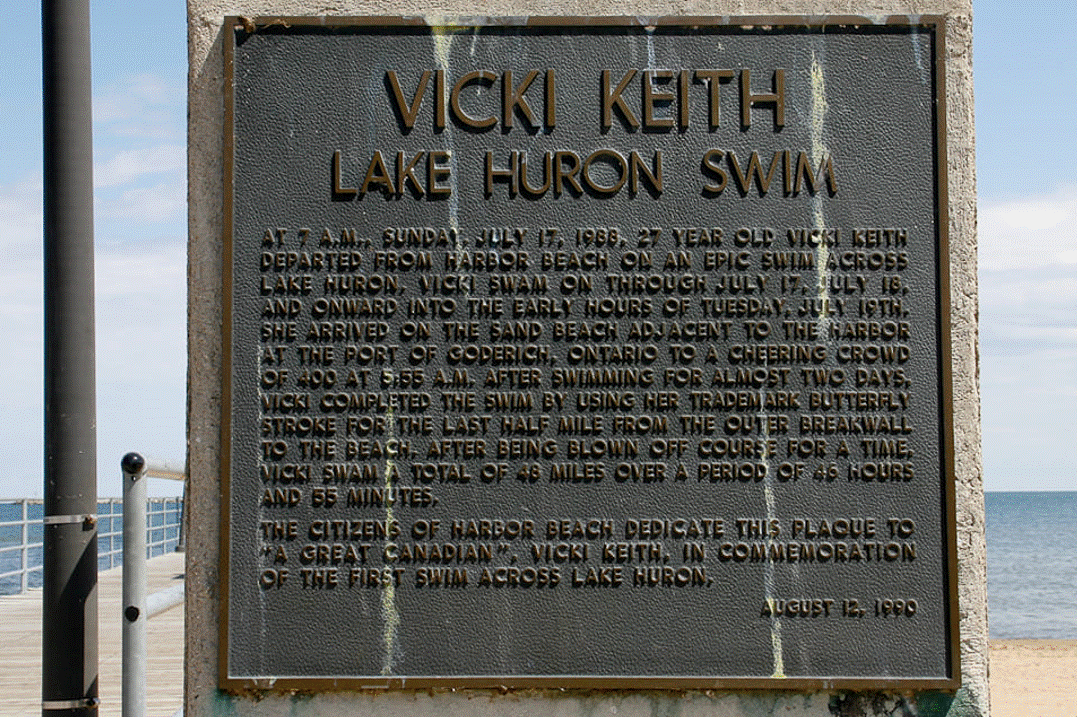
Plaque at Harbour Beach

The Harbor beach plaque was placed on 12 August 2000 at the Judge James H Lincoln Memorial Park on Trescott Street pier in Harbor Beach, Michigan, and also commemorates the Lake Huron swim. The plaque contains almost identical wording to the Goderich Beach Plaque, however it also specifies that "Vicki completed the swim by using her trademark butterfly stroke for the last half mile from the outer breakwall to the beach" rather than the more general wording of "Vicki completed the swim by using her trademark butterfly stroke for the last few hundred yards" contained in the Goderich Beach plaque. The Harbor beach plaque also does not mention Keith's fundraising efforts, and is dedicated by the citizens of Harbor Beach rather than the citizens of the Town of Goderich. The plaque is 67 cm wide, 66 cm high and 19 mm thick. The concrete stand it is mounted on is 1.83 m high, 79 cm wide and 14 cm thick. All the text on the plaque written in capitals. The main text is 0.5 inches high and left justified, while the headings are central standing at 2.5 inches high for the heading "VICKI KEITH" and 1.5 inches high for the heading "LAKE HURON SWIM".

=== Halls of Fame ===
In 1993, Keith was inducted into the Ontario Aquatic Hall of Fame.

Keith was inducted into the Terry Fox Hall of Fame in 1996.

In 2003, Keith was inducted into the International Marathon Swimming Hall of Fame due to her swimming and coaching achievements.

In 2005, Keith was inducted into the Ontario Sports Hall of Fame, for her numerous achievements in marathon swimming, especially her 80.5 kilometer butterfly swim around the shore line of Lake Ontario. Also recognized are her disability coaching efforts and fundraising over $1 million CAD for charity over her lifetime.

In 2019, Keith was awarded the Order of Sport and inducted into Canada's Sports Hall of Fame.

In addition to being inducted into many Halls of Fame, Keith has also participated in the selection committees of the Terry Fox Hall of Fame, and the Ontario Sports Awards.

=== Orders ===
==== Order of Canada ====
On 30 April 1992, Keith was awarded the Order of Canada for her achievements in marathon swimming, awareness and fund raising efforts for charity, and motivational speeches. She is therefore entitled to the post-nominal letters C.M.

==== Order of Ontario ====
In 1990, Keith was awarded the Order of Ontario, the highest order in the Canadian province of Ontario. Hence, Keith is also entitled to the post-nominal letters O. Ont.

== See also ==
- Harbor Beach Light
