= Grice House Museum =

Historic house in Michigan, United States

- James and Jane Grice House
- U.S. National Register of Historic Places
- Michigan State Historic Site
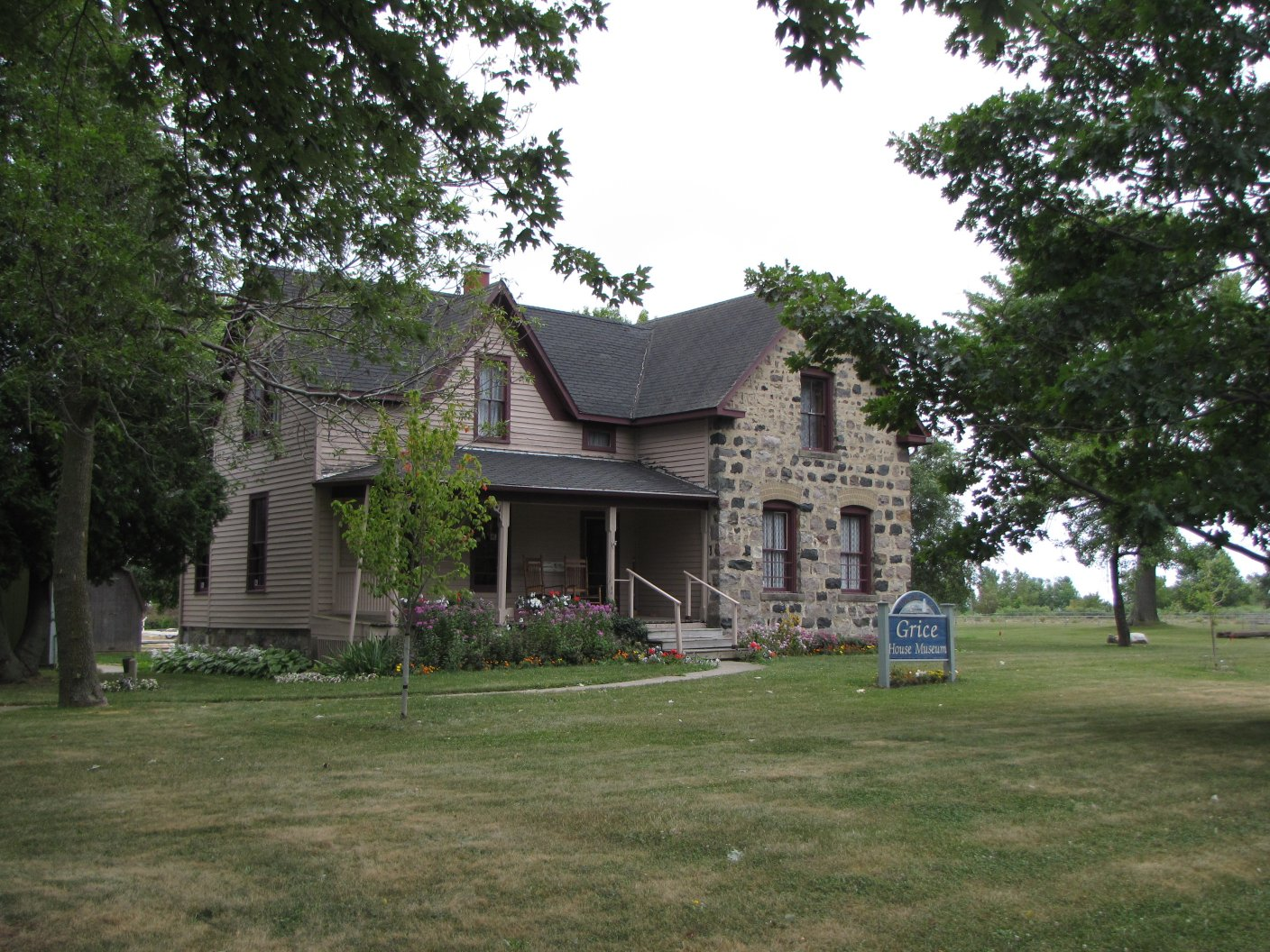

- Location within Michigan Location within the United States
- Interactive map
- Location: 865 N. Huron Ave., Harbor Beach, Michigan
- Coordinates: 43°51′20″N 82°39′12″W
- Area: less than one acre
- Architectural style: Gothic
- NRHP reference No.: 82000534
- Added to NRHP: November 12, 1982

The Grice House is located at 865 North Huron Avenue in Harbor Beach, Michigan. It is a museum showing life in years gone by.

== History ==
The Grice House was built by James G. Grice, who immigrated to the United States from England in the early 1860s with five of his seven sons and one daughter. By the 1870s was employed at the Rock Falls sawmill. The building survived the 1881 Thumb Fire. In the 1960s, with the last Grice descendant deceased, the city of Harbor Beach purchased the property to settle the estates of James and Jane Grice. Shortly afterwards, a group of local volunteers stepped forward to convert the house and surrounding area into a museum.

== Description ==
The museum complex now includes the house itself, the old Adam's schoolhouse, and a pole barn. Special exhibit areas include a Marine Room, Sewing Room, Industrial Room, Military Room, agricultural machinery and implements, and the reconstructed 1800s-era schoolhouse. The museum houses almost 2000 artifacts throughout the three museum buildings.

Early exhibits include a pump organ donated by Gladys Seither, a large handmade loom by Henry Roots, and an interesting collection of pioneer type tools from Albert Frank.

By the summer of 1981, the tremendous response from people in the community had made it possible to furnish the kitchen, living room, tool room, and one bedroom.

The following year saw the Marine Room take shape. The original fourth order Fresnel lens of the Harbor Beach Lighthouse, which was removed from service in 1986, was donated to the Harbor Beach Historical Society, and can be seen at the Grice House Museum.

A Sewing room, so named because of a large donation of clothes from Mrs. Eilber in Port Hope, a beautiful spinning wheel given by Freda Will, and much more. The exhibit also includes style clothes, pattern books, and accessories.

The Industrial Room, the largest second story room in the nine room house, preserves the early industrial history of Harbor Beach.

The museum also features a collection of farm equipment in a pole barn erected in 1984, next to the house.

The Adams School, built in 1920, was moved to the grounds in 1988. This school serves as a reminder of the area's educational roots.
