= Harbor Beach Community Schools =

School district in Michigan

Address
- 402 South 5th Street Harbor Beach, Michigan, 48441; United States

District information
- Type: Public school district
- Grades: Pre-K to 12
- Superintendent: William Chilman
- Schools: 3
- Budget: $7,701,000 2022-2023 total expenditures
- NCES District ID: 2600007

Students and staff
- Students: 483 (2024-2025)
- Teachers: 30.65 (2024-2025) on FTE basis
- Staff: 64.73 (2024-2025) FTE
- Student–teacher ratio: 15.76 (2024-2025)
- District mascot: Pirates
- Colors: Orange and Black

Other information
- Website: www.hbpirates.org

Harbor Beach Community Schools is a public school district in Huron County, Michigan. It serves Harbor Beach, and parts of the townships of Bloomfield, Rubicon, Sand Beach, Sherman, and Sigel. It also serves Forestville and part of Delaware Township in Sanilac County.

Its school at 402 South 5th Street contains preschool through 12th grade. The school colors are orange and black; and the mascot is a pirate. Students may attend the Huron Area Technical Center in the eleventh and twelfth grade.

== History ==
The previous Harbor Beach High School was a 3-story brick and stone building with a central bell tower. It was built in 1904 on the corner of State and Fifth Streets after the school it replaced, built in 1860, burned down.

The 1904 school burned down in November 1946. While the current building was constructed, high school classes were held at the Community House.

The current high school opened in fall 1949 and originally held grades five to twelve. A new elementary school opened on Trescott Street in 1971. Designed by Charles Valentine of Marysville, it used an open classroom concept that was innovative at the time.

In 2001, a bond issue passed to replace the elementary school (renamed Ramsey-Robertson Elementary) with a new addition to the high school building. The elementary school was torn down in 2003 as the newly renovated and expanded Harbor Beach Community School opened. As of fall 2003, all Harbor Beach students share a single building at 402 South Fifth Street.
