= Leslie Street Spit =

Human-made headland in Ontario, Canada

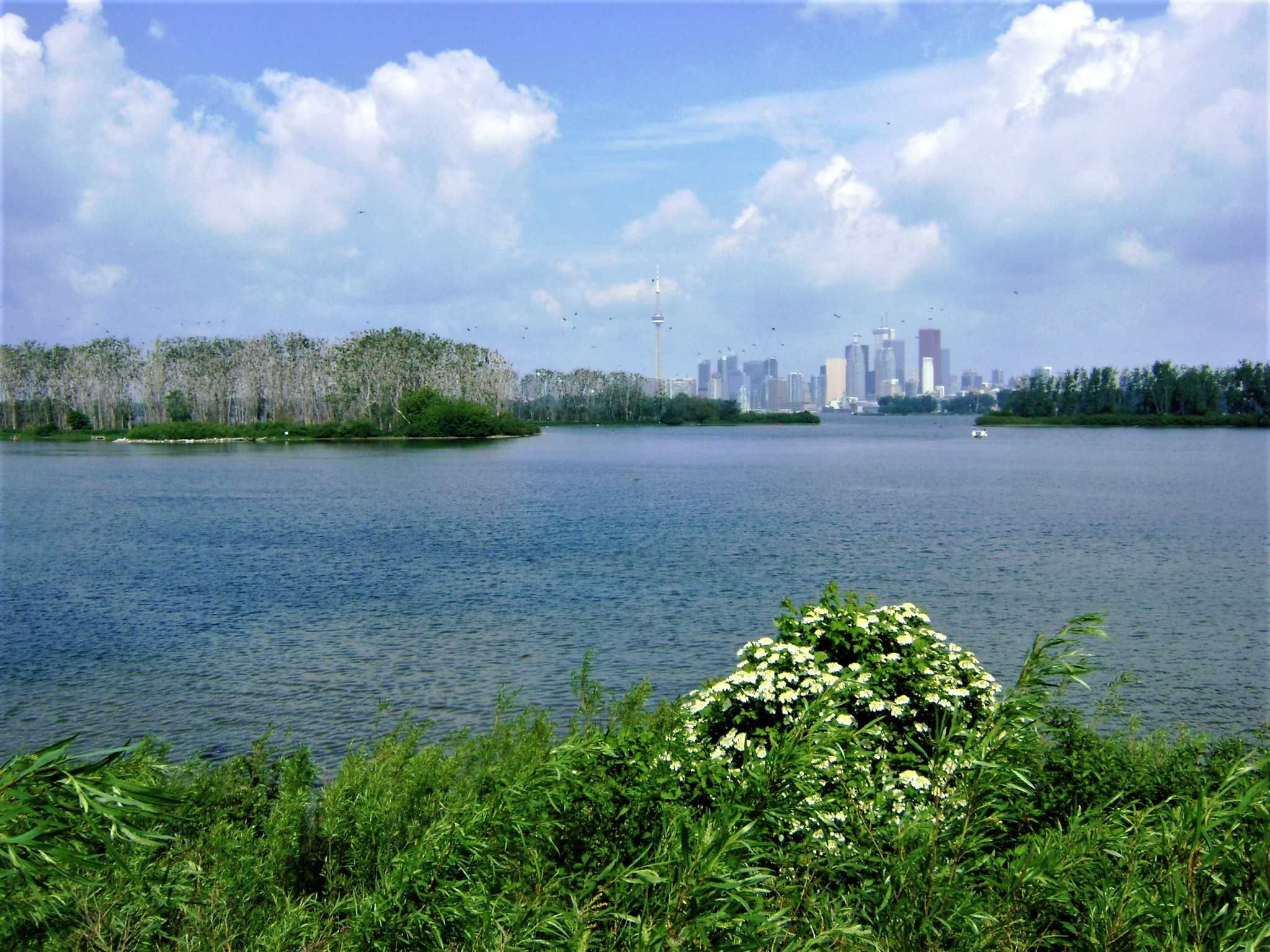
- Interactive map of Leslie Street Spit
- Location: Toronto Ontario Canada
- Coordinates: 43.6178°N 79.3425°W
- Website: https://trca.ca/parks/tommy-thompson-park/

The Leslie Street Spit, or officially the Outer Harbour East Headland, is a human-made headland in Toronto, Ontario, Canada, extending from the city's east end in a roughly southwesterly direction into Lake Ontario. It is about 5 kilometres (3 mi) long. The Spit is the result of five decades of lakefilling by the Toronto Port Authority. It was conceived as an extension of Toronto Harbour, and has evolved into a largely passive recreation area. Naturalization had not been planned but the process is now actively managed by the Toronto and Region Conservation Authority. A large portion of it is classified as an Environmentally Sensitive Area (ESA) and it is recognized as an Important Bird Area.

Its common name is technically incorrect, since it is not truly a spit, but Torontonians almost never use the official name. The road running along the peninsula is a southern extension of Leslie Street, hence the popular nickname. The Canadian musical group Leslie Spit Treeo, prominent in the 1990s, took its name from Leslie Street Spit.

== History ==
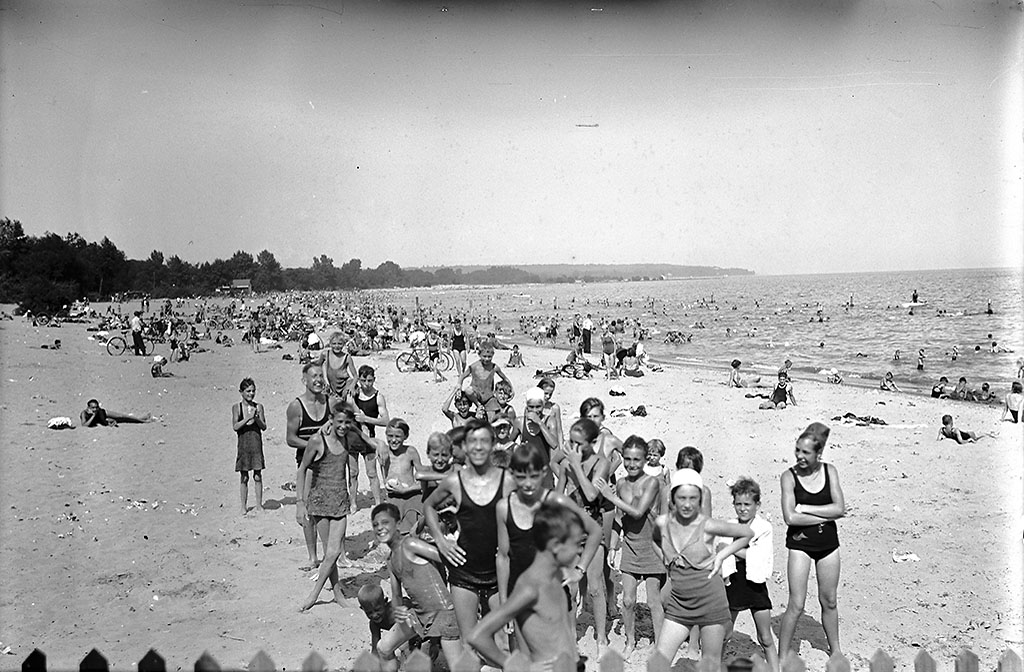
Leslie Beach looking east, 1935. The beach disappeared when the spit was constructed.

The Spit is a man-made landfill that began in the 1950s when the Toronto Harbour Commission began a project to create a breakwater for Toronto's Outer Harbour. It was part of a plan to expand the capacity of the harbour in anticipation of an expected increase in shipping traffic on the Great Lakes after the Saint Lawrence Seaway opened in 1959. However, owing to the containerization revolution of the 1960s, cargo traffic began to shift to East Coast ports, and shipping volumes in Toronto fell by almost half between 1969 and 1973. Thus, the need for an outer harbour never arose, and all cargo ships calling at Toronto still use the Inner Harbour, while the Outer Harbour sees only pleasure boat traffic. The spit is a man-made successor of a natural sand bar / peninsula that existed to the north before infilling of Port Lands and connected to Toronto Islands before 1858.

While the original need for the landform was eliminated, the site continued to receive excavation and construction waste from the building of Toronto's subways, office towers and other large projects. In the late 1970s, dredgeate from the nearby Keating Channel was also dumped on the emerging spit, which was seen as a better solution than dumping the polluted material into open water. Dredging is an ongoing process and PortsToronto continues to dump silt and mud in the Spit's embayments.

In the early 1970s, the Spit was one of up to a dozen landfill parks across the Toronto-area shoreline planned by the Toronto and Region Conservation Authority (TRCA, but then known as the Metropolitan Toronto Regional Conservation Authority). It began as a long, slender finger of bare land stretching out into the lake, and developed several lobes enclosing small bays. It was eventually colonized by a variety of plant life.

At parts of the Spit created in 1964 reasearchers Heidy Schorf and Jennifer Foster found household items within the rubble, such as, teacups, toothpaste, eyeglasses, etc.

=== Development plans and political challenges ===
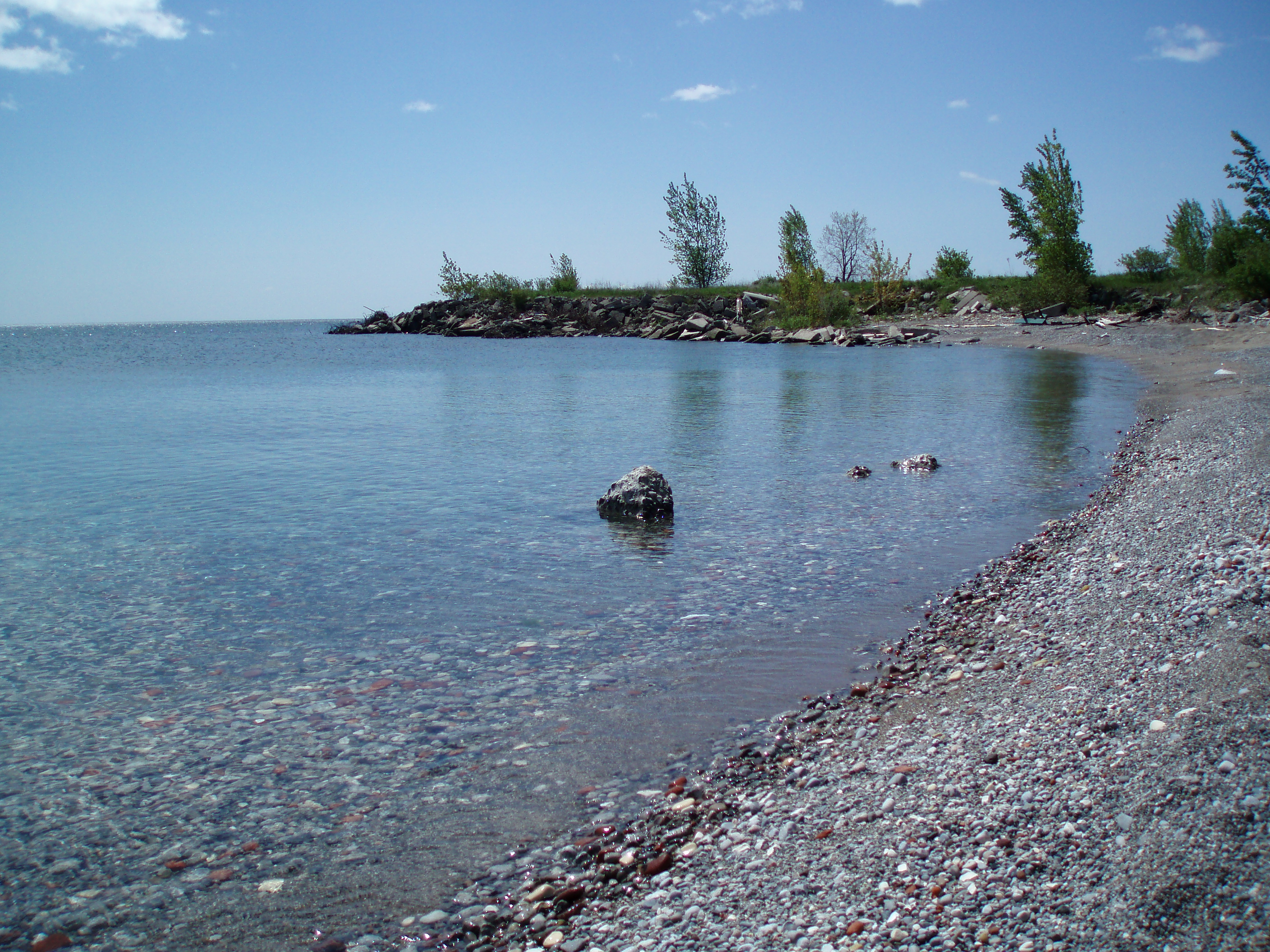
Leslie Street Spit was the result of decades of land reclamation by the Toronto Port Authority. Beginning in the 1970s, these areas began to be converted into parks by the TRCA.

The provincial government gave the TRCA the mandate to develop parks, beaches and recreation areas along the waterfront from Mississauga to Ajax. This was referred to as the Metro Waterfront Plan and excluded only the area between Leslie St. and Dufferin St. (roughly the eastern harbour to Ontario Place in the west). Even at this early stage, there were reports that there was little coordination between TRCA (a joint Metro Toronto - provincial body), the city's planning department and the federal Harbour Commission.

From this period until 1985, the proposed public area on the Spit was referred to as the Aquatic Park. Public discussions on the future of the site were held in June 1974 and proposed uses included mooring for over 500 boats, along with bicycling, picnicking and fishing facilities. A Master Plan was prepared for the TRCA and the details were publicized in March 1976. The consultants' report proposed significant development, including expanded marinas (now mooring for 1,500 boats), an amphitheatre, a water ski area and a hotel. Former City of Toronto councillor Colin Vaughan portrayed the consultation process as narrowly focused in a February 1977 article. Vaughan cited the following language from the terms of reference for the consultants: "to produce an active water-oriented recreation concept featuring major boating, swimming and aquatic facilities" and noted that only 20 acres of the 250 acres under study were set aside for naturalized areas. The Master Plan was criticized by several groups and in the end, governments were not prepared to fund the high cost on a relatively controversial proposal.

In 1984, the TRCA launched a new planning process for the Spit as the organization acknowledged that the 1976 plan was "no longer appropriate". There was significant lobbying by sailing and naturalist groups, however, the Spit was becoming naturalized with little interference. However, in 1976 the Aquatic Park Sailing Club was formed on one of the embayments. It is still operating today with mooring balls for 100 sailboats and a clubhouse and dock. The members also consider themselves stewards of the spit. They are off grid and use solar power. In 1985, the TRCA announced that the northern portion of the Spit was designated as an environmentally sensitive area and that future plans would accommodate both recreational and naturalist groups.

=== Land title ===
Because it was newly created land, it was owned by the Crown and held by the provincial Ministry of Natural Resources (MNR). The land set aside for the park was transferred to the TRCA in 1984. However, the MNR retains ownership of the active landfill portion of the spit.

=== Friends of the Spit ===
The Leslie Street Spit's evolution into an urban wilderness was never in the city's plans. The spit's status as such was secured by a number of organizations, with the citizens' advocacy group known as Friends of the Spit at the forefront of advocacy to naturalize the site.

== Structure ==
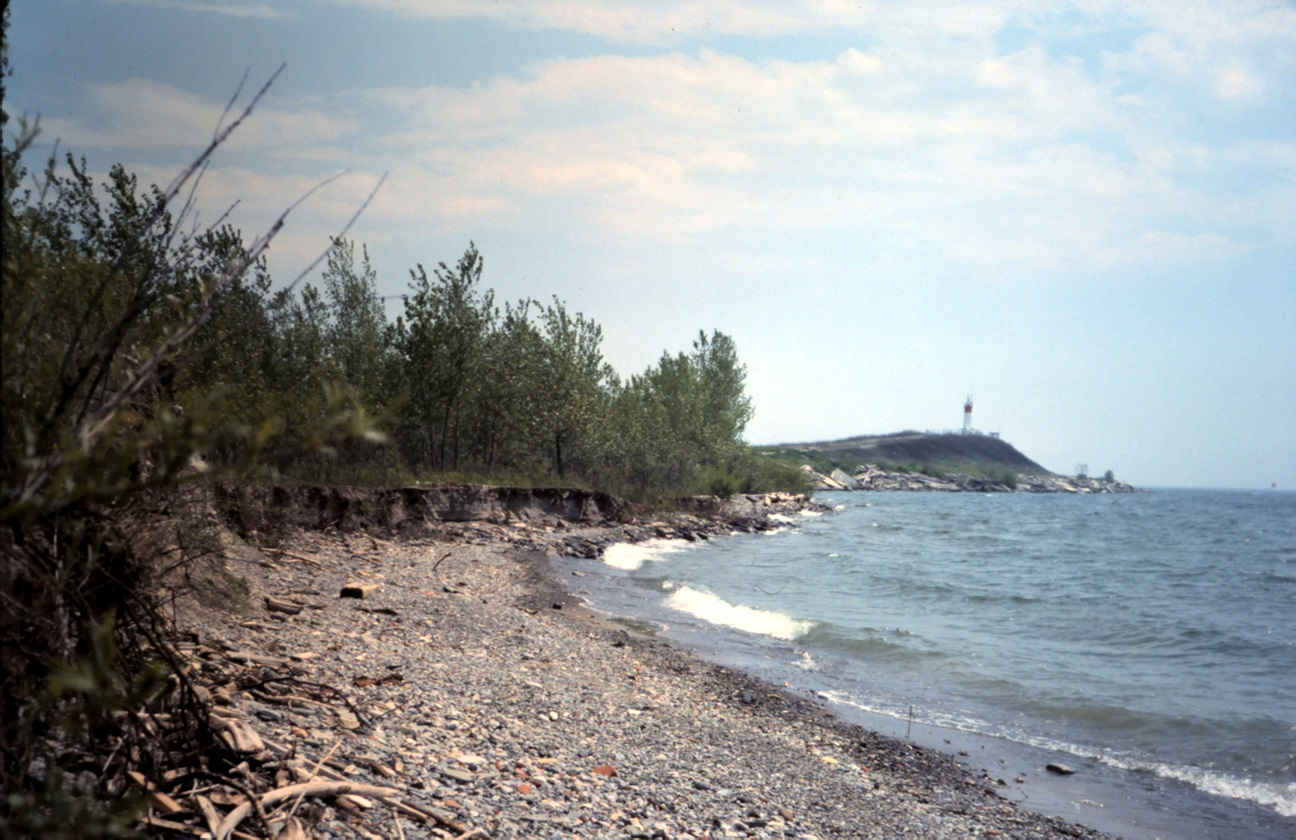
View of the Outer Harbour East Headland and Vicki Keith Point.

The inner part of the Spit consists of three embayments. These were designed to hold dredged material from the Inner Harbour and the Keating Channel. The first embayment has now been filled. It has been capped with clean fill and is being restored by the TRCA as a marsh. The remaining two embayments have about 50 years' capacity remaining. Between the Port Lands and the Spit lies the Outer Harbour. Part of this body of water was once the edge of a marsh that was part of Ashbridge's Bay.

In 1929s, construction of a breakwater (called an "endikement" by official park documentation) on the eastern side of the embayments began. The breakwater is designed protects the embayments and also deflects substantial sediment from the Inner Harbour.

=== Access ===
As late as 1973, there was no formal access to the Spit, although visits could be arranged with the Toronto Harbour Commission. However, by the summer of 1974, the Toronto Harbour Commission was providing bus service to the Spit on Sunday afternoons.

The Spit is open to the public from 5:30 am. to 9:00 p.m. on weekends and statutory holidays (with the exception of Christmas Day, Boxing Day and New Years Day), and from 4:00 p.m. to 9:00 p.m. on weekdays. It is closed during the day on weekdays owing to the ongoing construction of the spit, conducted by PortsToronto.

The Leslie Street Spit is a car-free area when the park is open, with strictly controlled vehicle access to the mooring area when the park is closed. The Spit is also pet-free to enforce the safety of this habitat under rejuvenation. The Spit's outermost end is known as Vicki Keith Point, after a famous Canadian swimmer. There has been an automated lighthouse there since 1974.

=== Tommy Thompson Nature Reserve ===
The northern half of the Spit has been designated as Tommy Thompson Park, named after a former Toronto Parks Commissioner, and managed by the TRCA. The southern half is still an active landfill for clean debris, managed by PortsToronto. Eventually the entire Spit will become parkland.

The Tommy Thompson Park Pedestrian Bridge has been reopened for public use following a complete rebuild by PortsToronto.

In September 2026, Toronto City Councillor Paula Fletcher forwarded a motion to the Executive Committee of the TRCA to change the official name from "Tommy Thompson Park" to "Tommy Thompson Nature Reserve." The motion was approved unanimously and officially adopted by the TRCA Board of Directors on October 2, 2026.

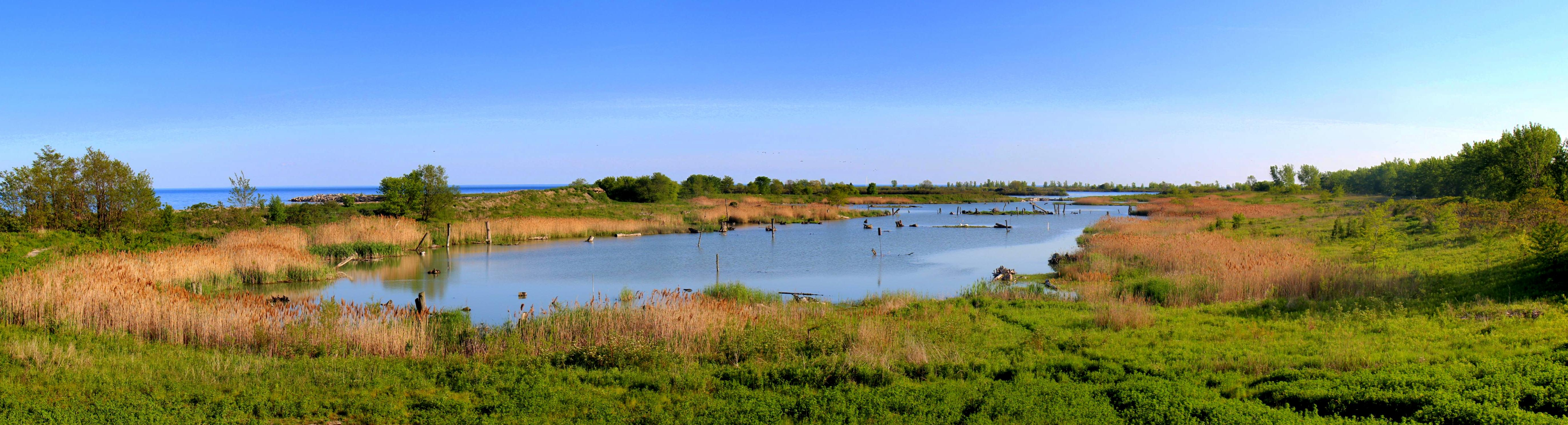
Panorama of Tommy Thompson Park, a park managed by the TRCA.

== Important Bird Area ==
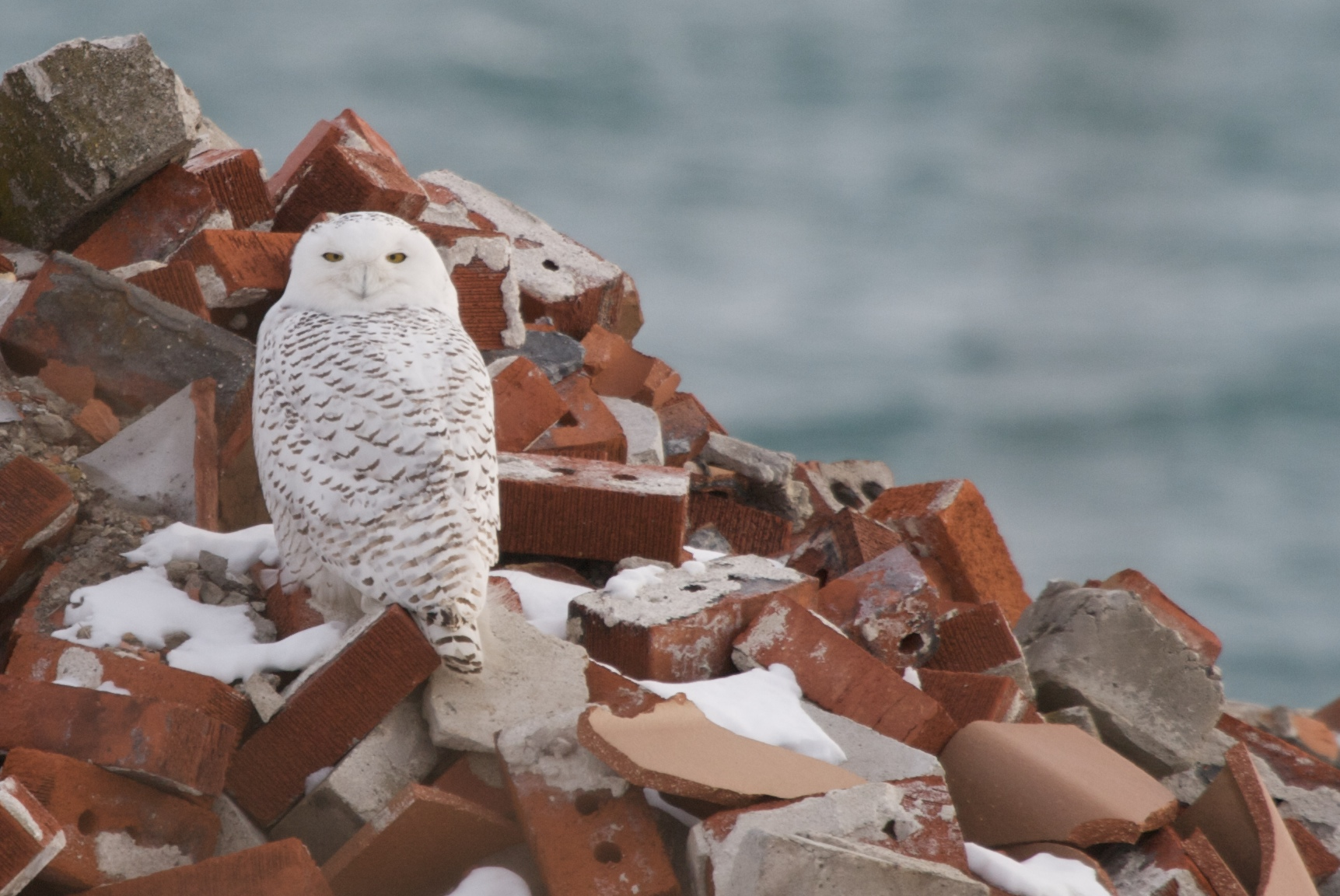
A snowy owl at the Spit. The area was designated an Important Bird Area by Nature Canada and Bird Studies Canada given its importance to a number of bird species.

Quite a number of bird species are found on the Leslie Street Spit. More than 300 species of birds have been identified, 45 of which breed on the headland. Among the birds that may be observed on the headland are the ring-billed gull, the black-crowned night-heron, the double-crested cormorant, the common tern, the Caspian tern, and the herring gull.

Owing to the Leslie Street Spit's importance to so many bird species, it has been designated an Important Bird Area (IBA) by Nature Canada and Bird Studies Canada which are the Canadian partners of BirdLife International. Peninsula D has also become the site of a comprehensive bird research station, run by the TRCA. The Tommy Thompson Park Bird Research Station operates five days a week during spring and fall migration, and runs other projects within the Greater Toronto Area throughout the rest of the year. Visitors to the station are welcome on weekends when the park is open.

== Gallery ==
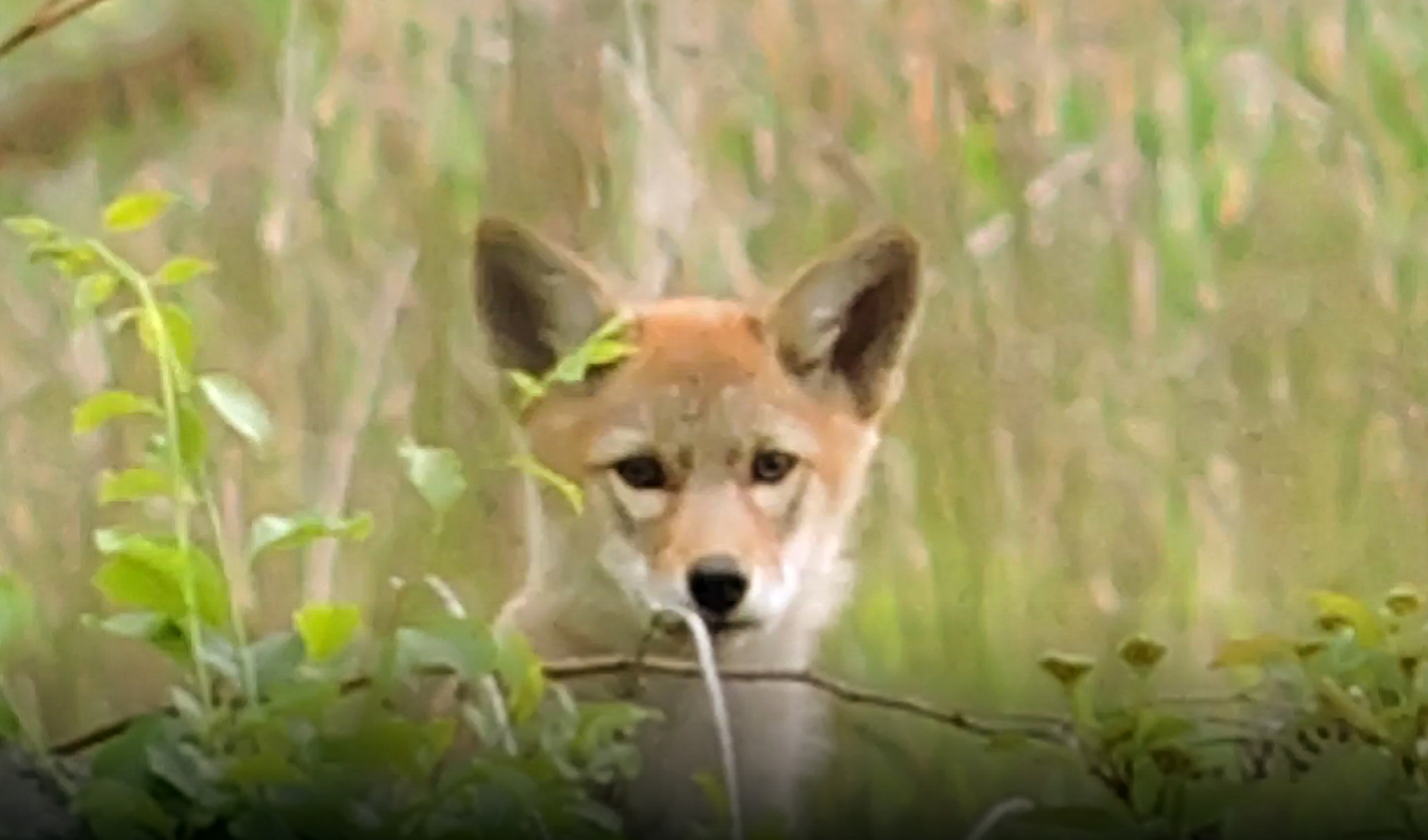
Coyote pup

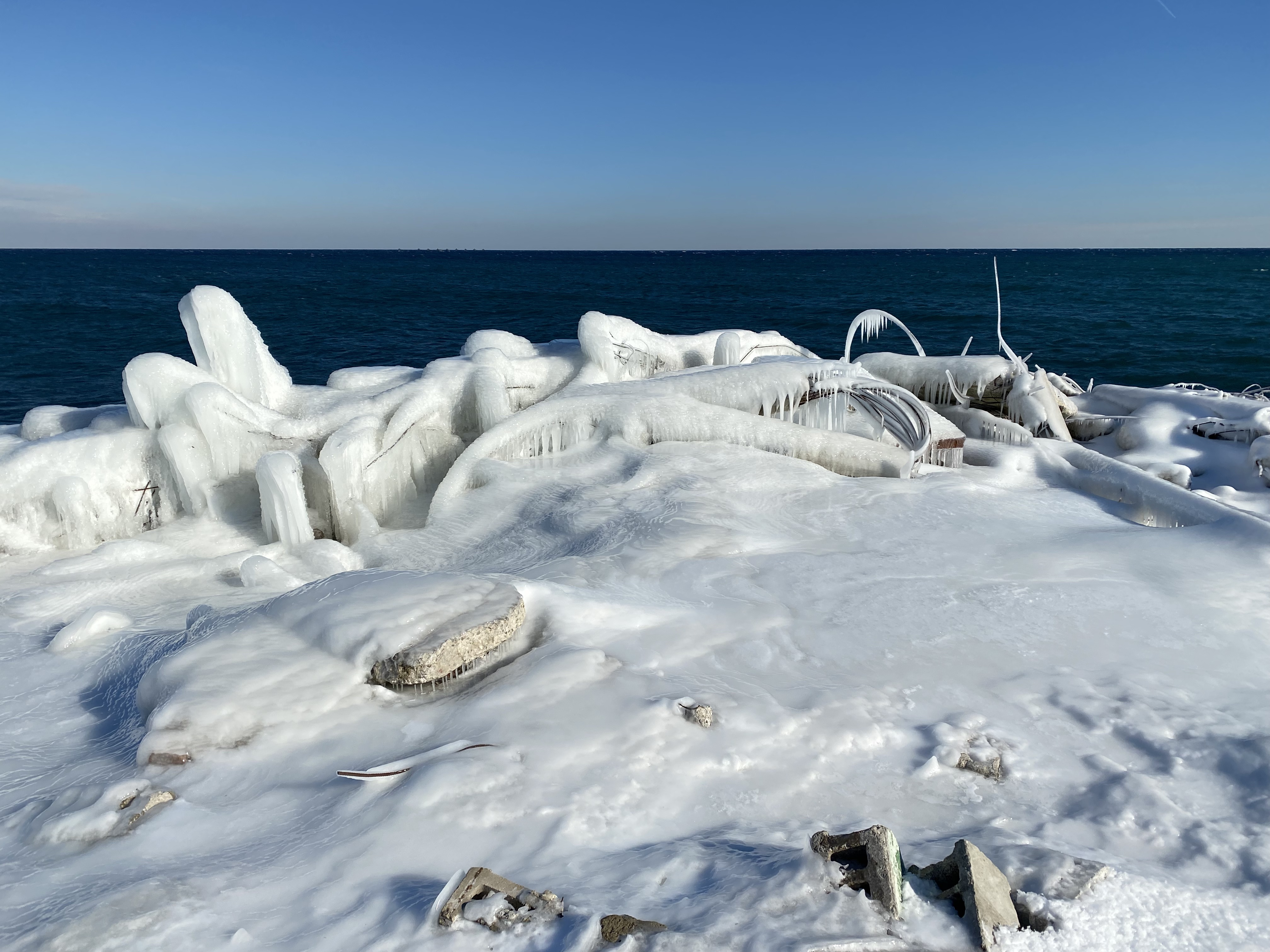
Rubble and other human-made artifacts covered by winter ice at the Leslie Spit.

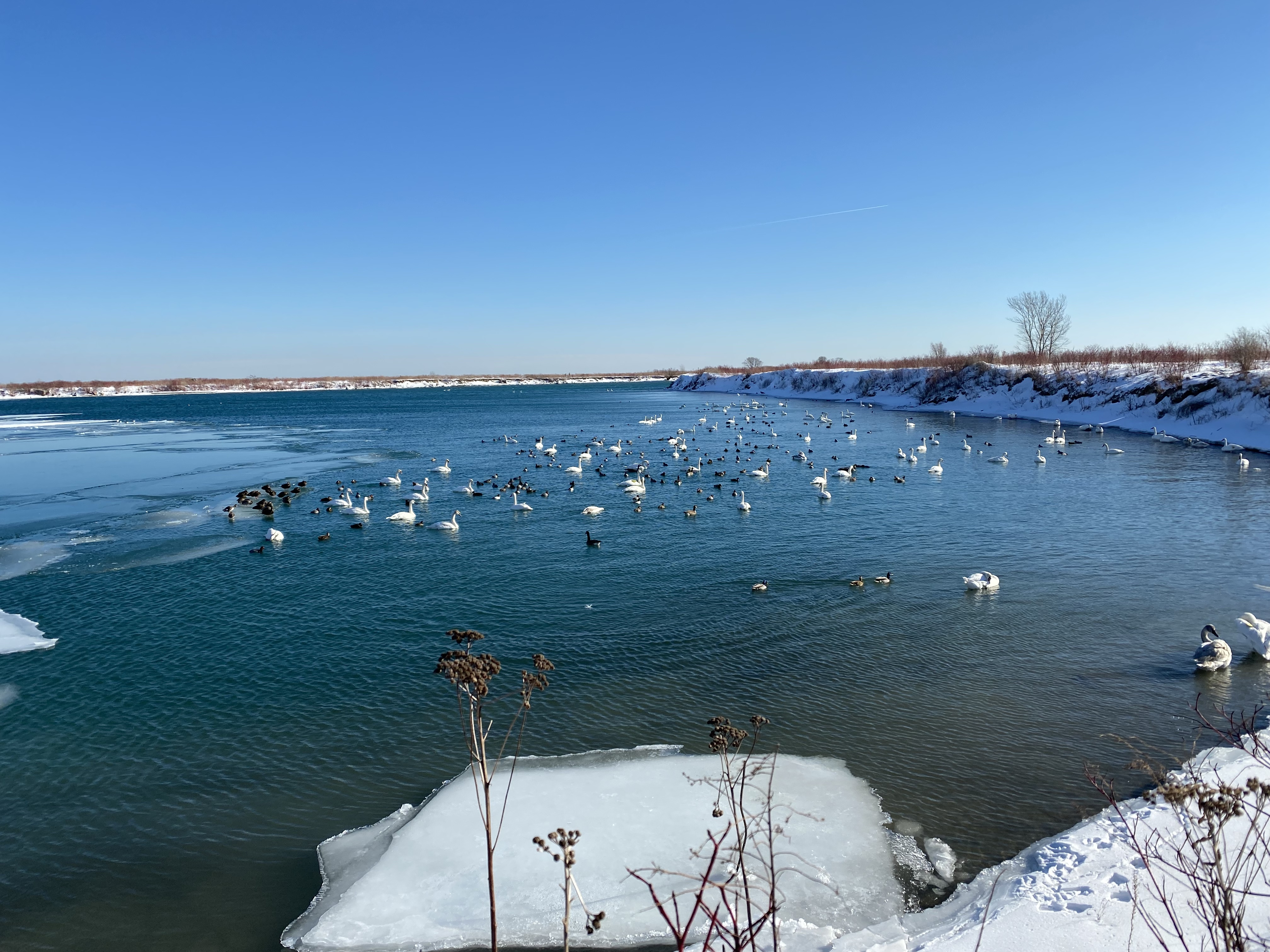
Swans, ducks, and other birds basking in the sun at the Leslie Spit in winter.

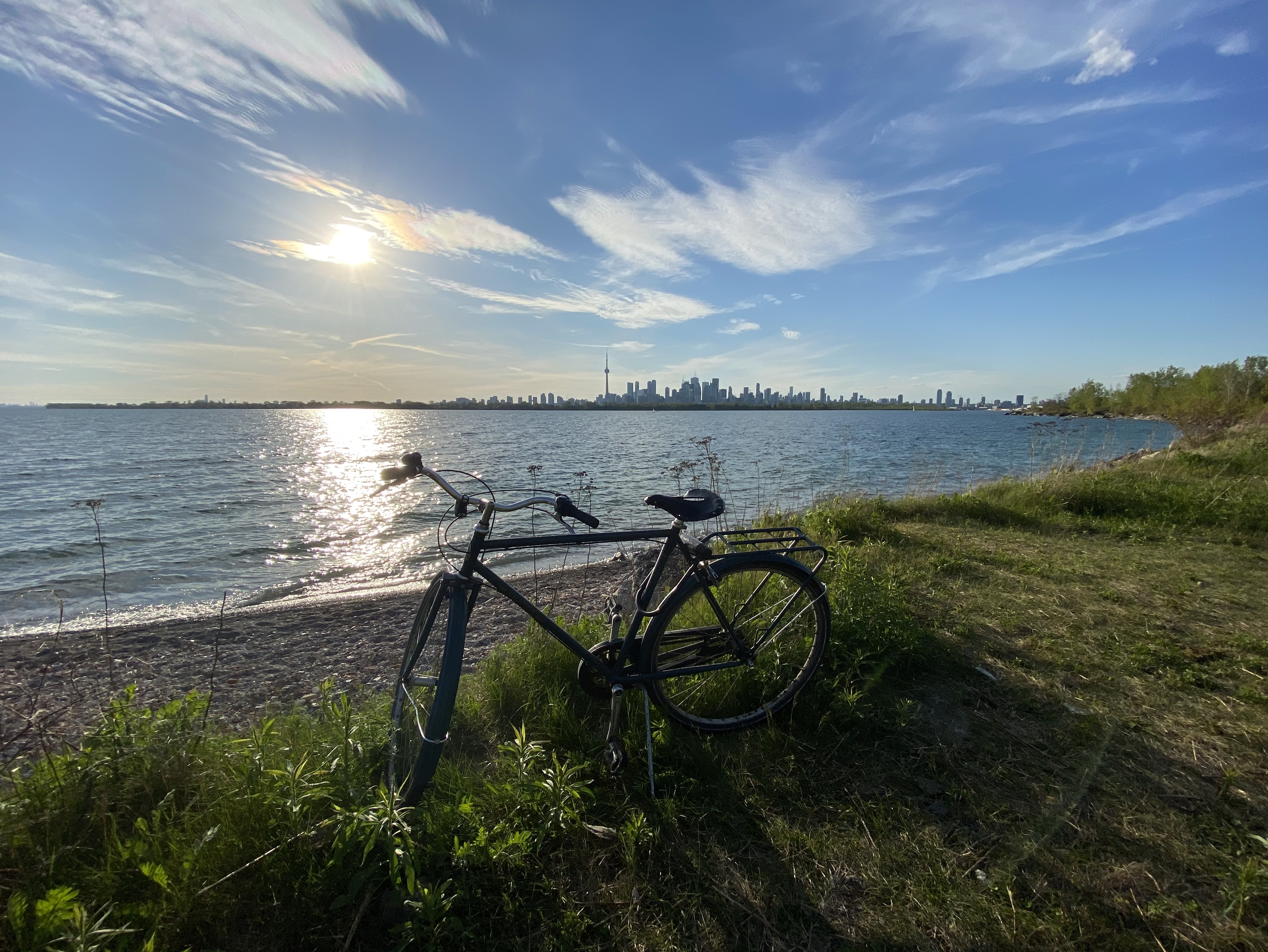
The Leslie Spit in late spring looking across the Main Harbour Channel towards the Toronto skyline.

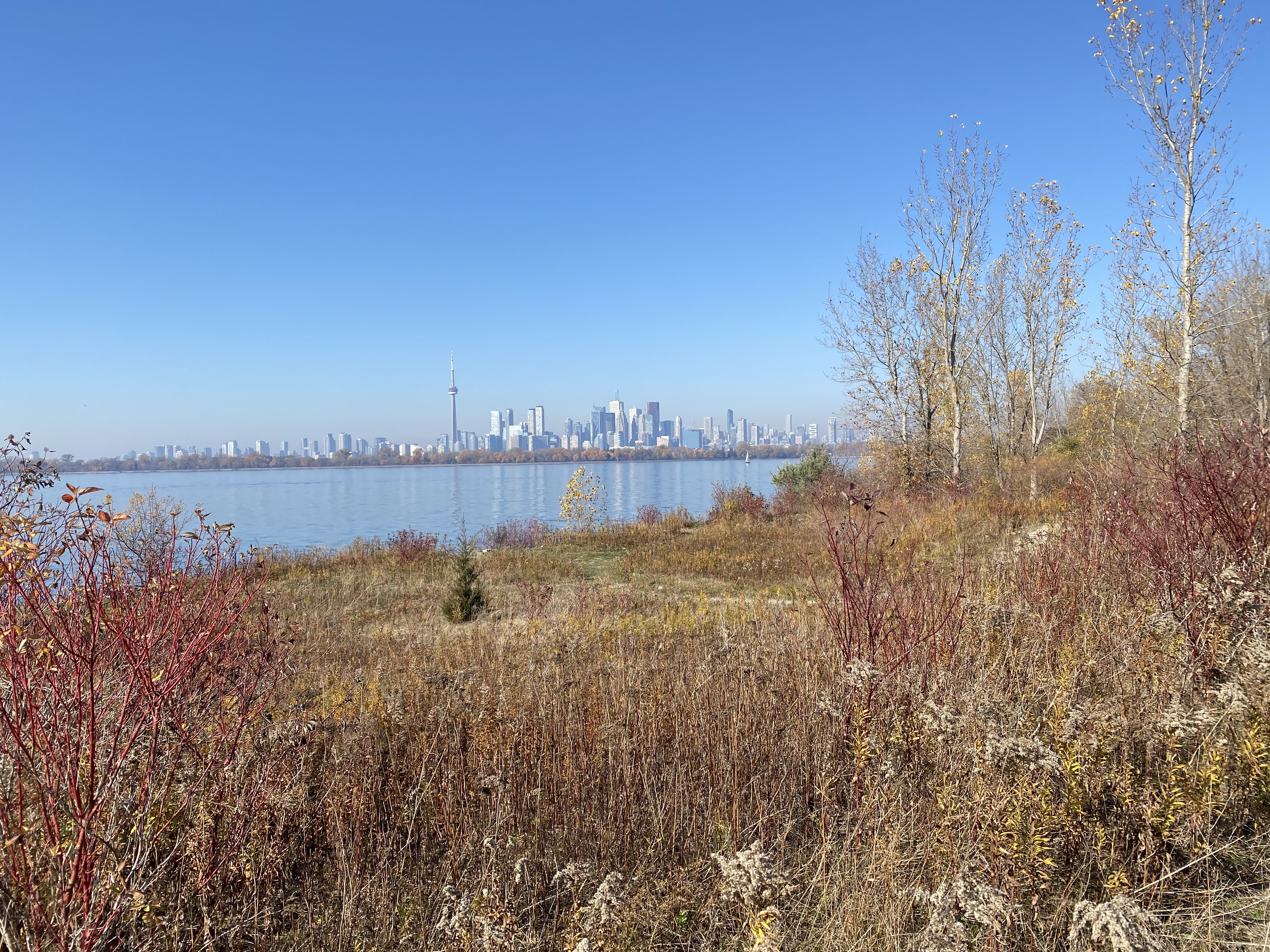
Looking towards downtown Toronto from the Leslie Spit in autumn.

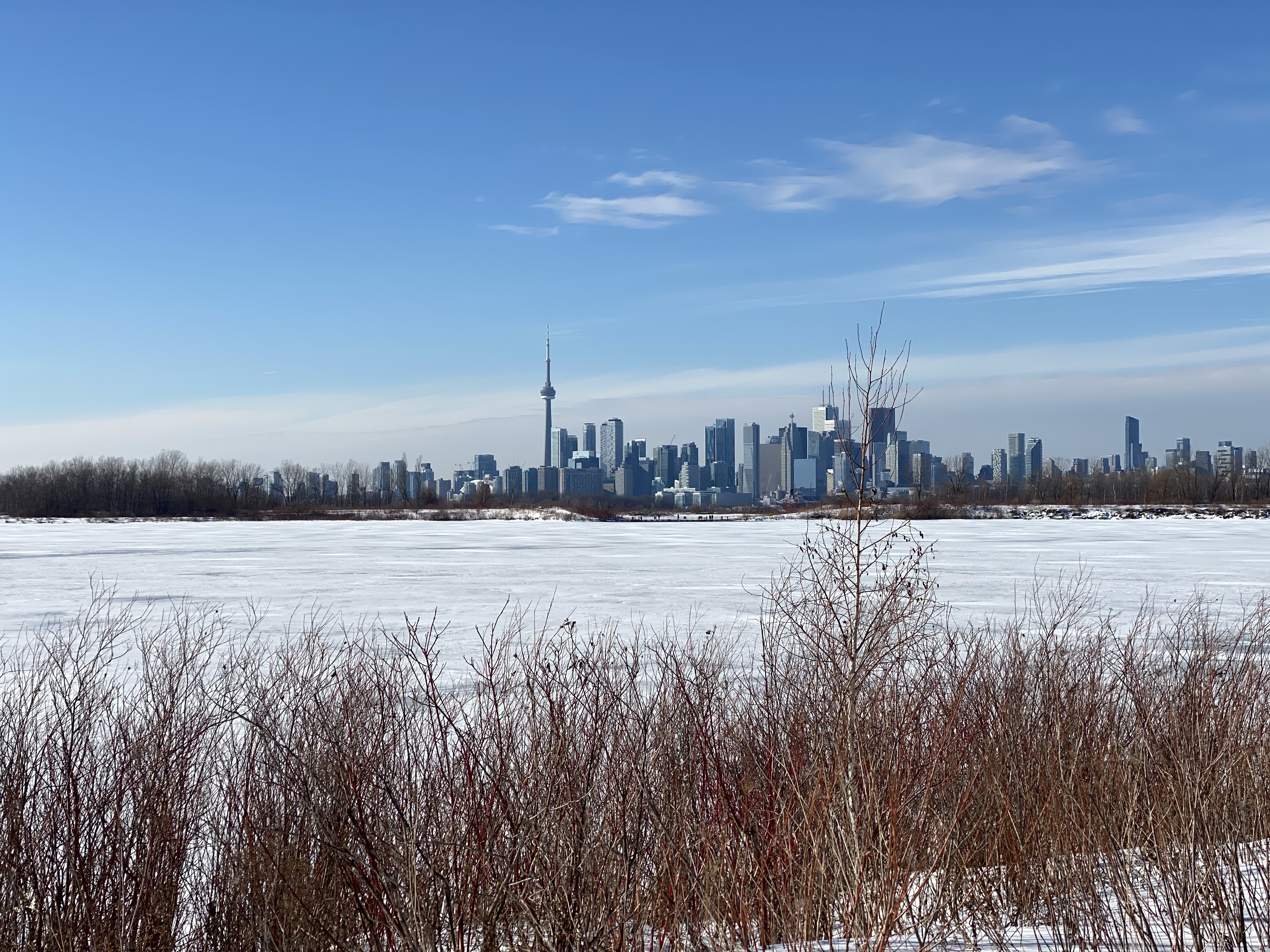
The Leslie Spit in winter looking towards downtown Toronto.

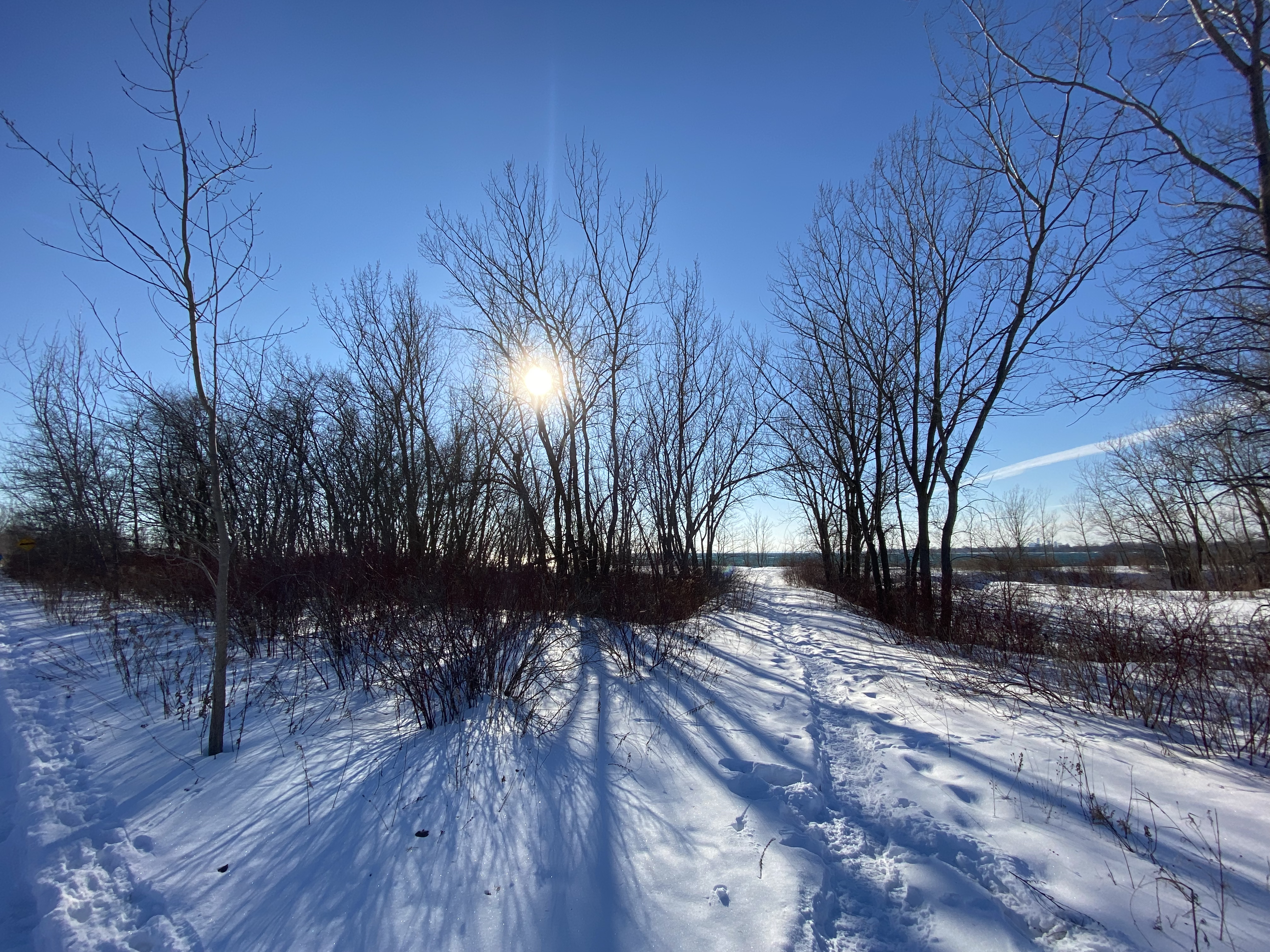
View of the setting sun from the Leslie Spit in winter

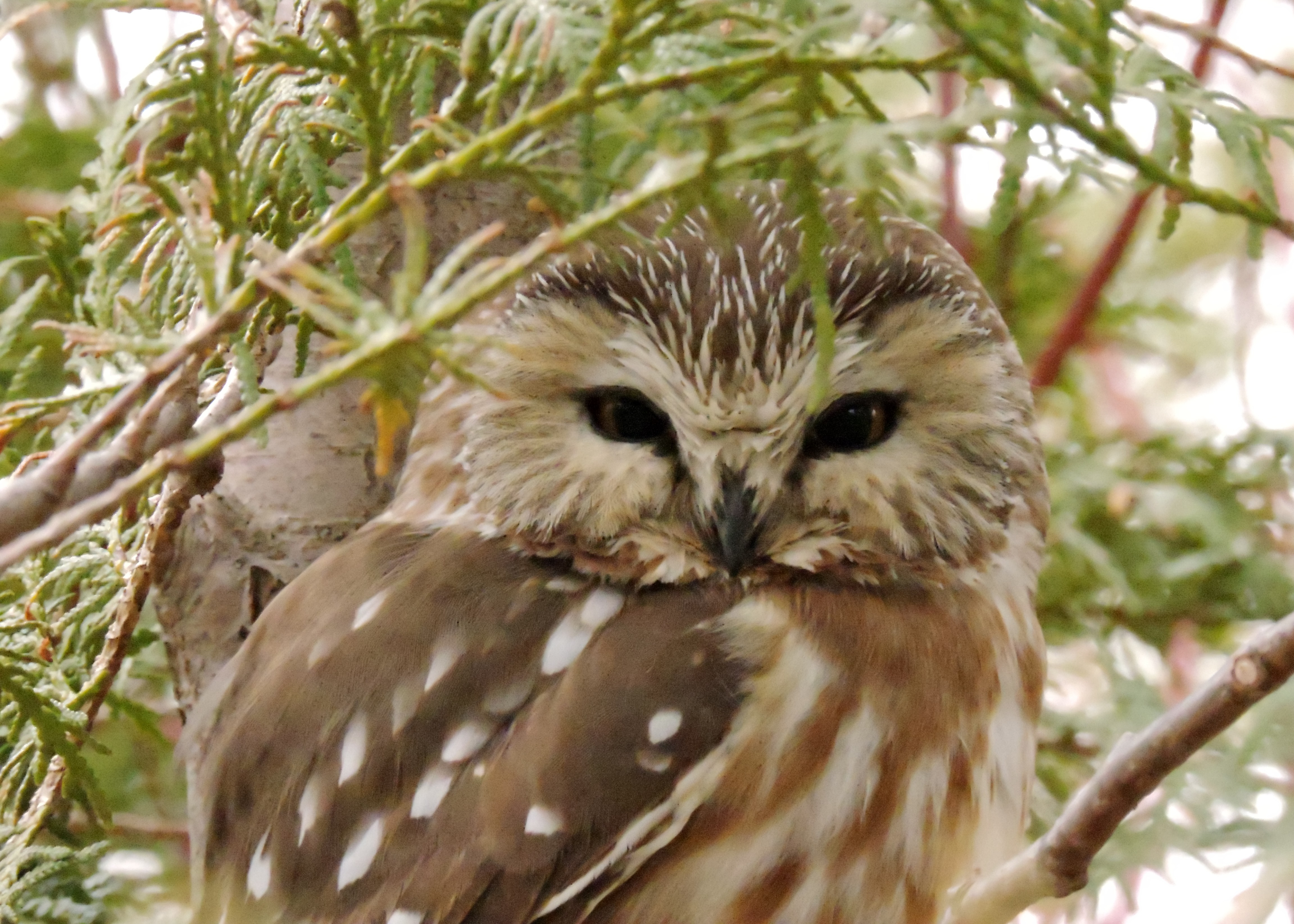
Northern Saw-whet Owl

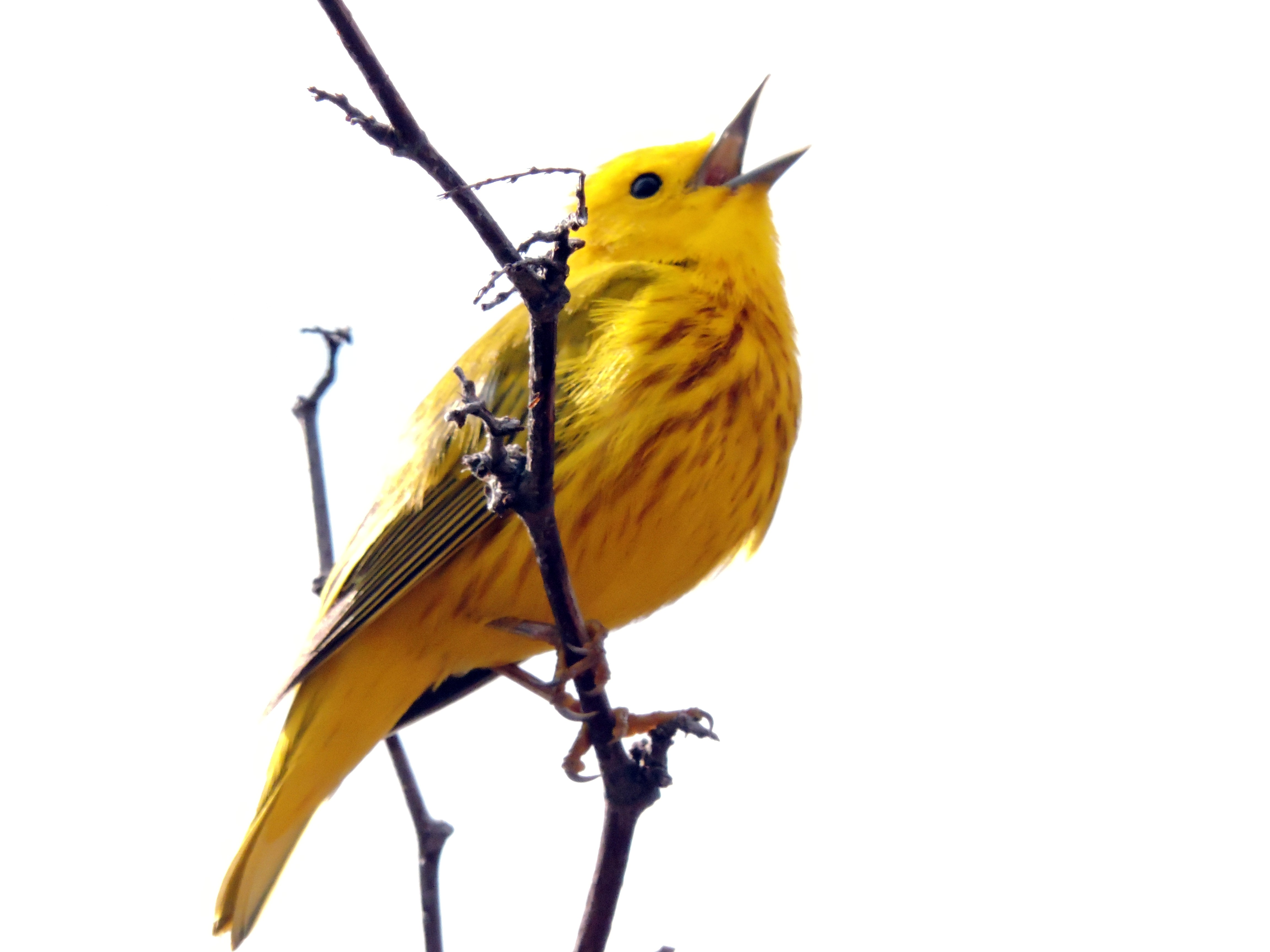
Yellow warbler singing

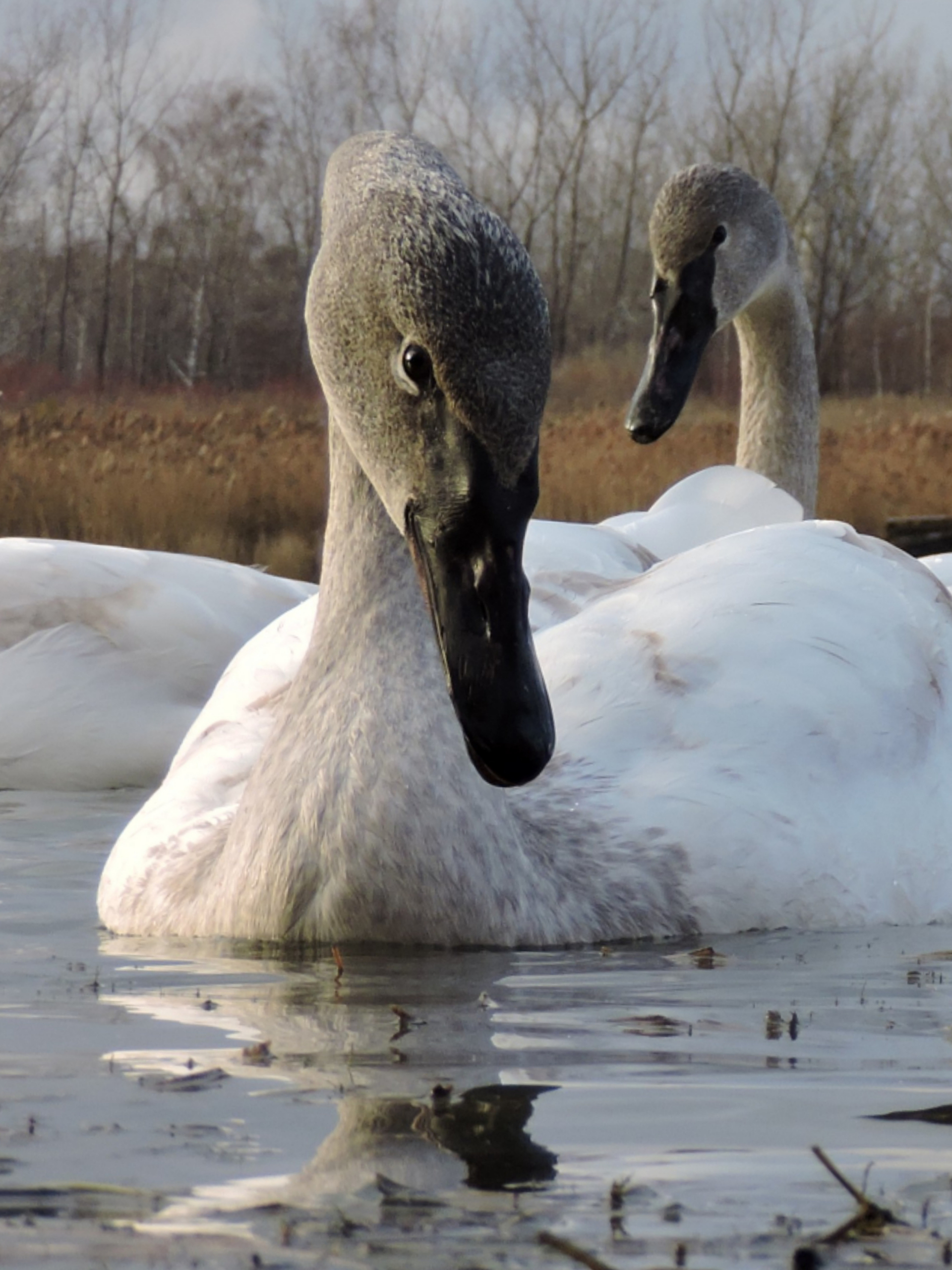
Curious young swan

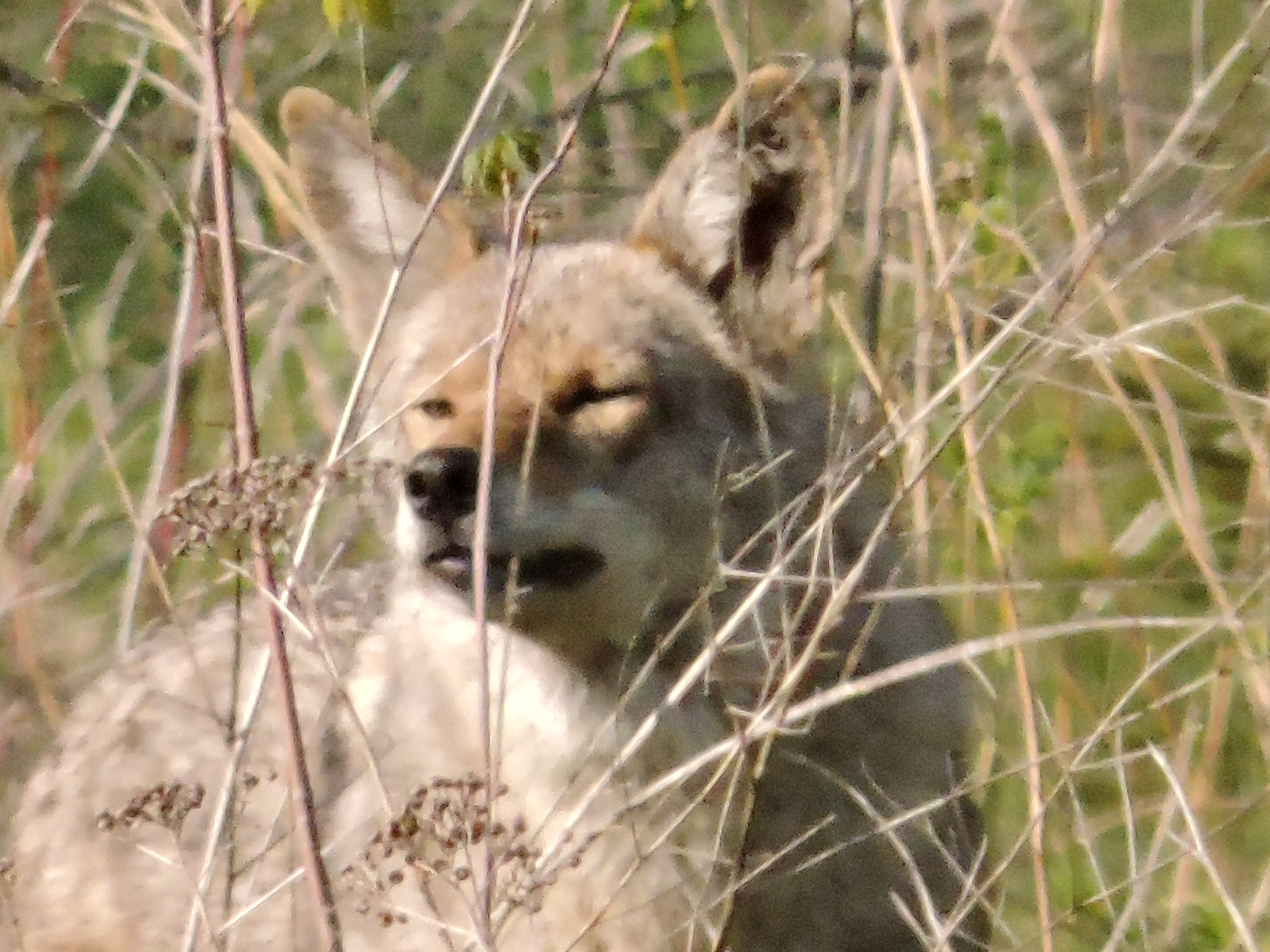
Dominant male coyote

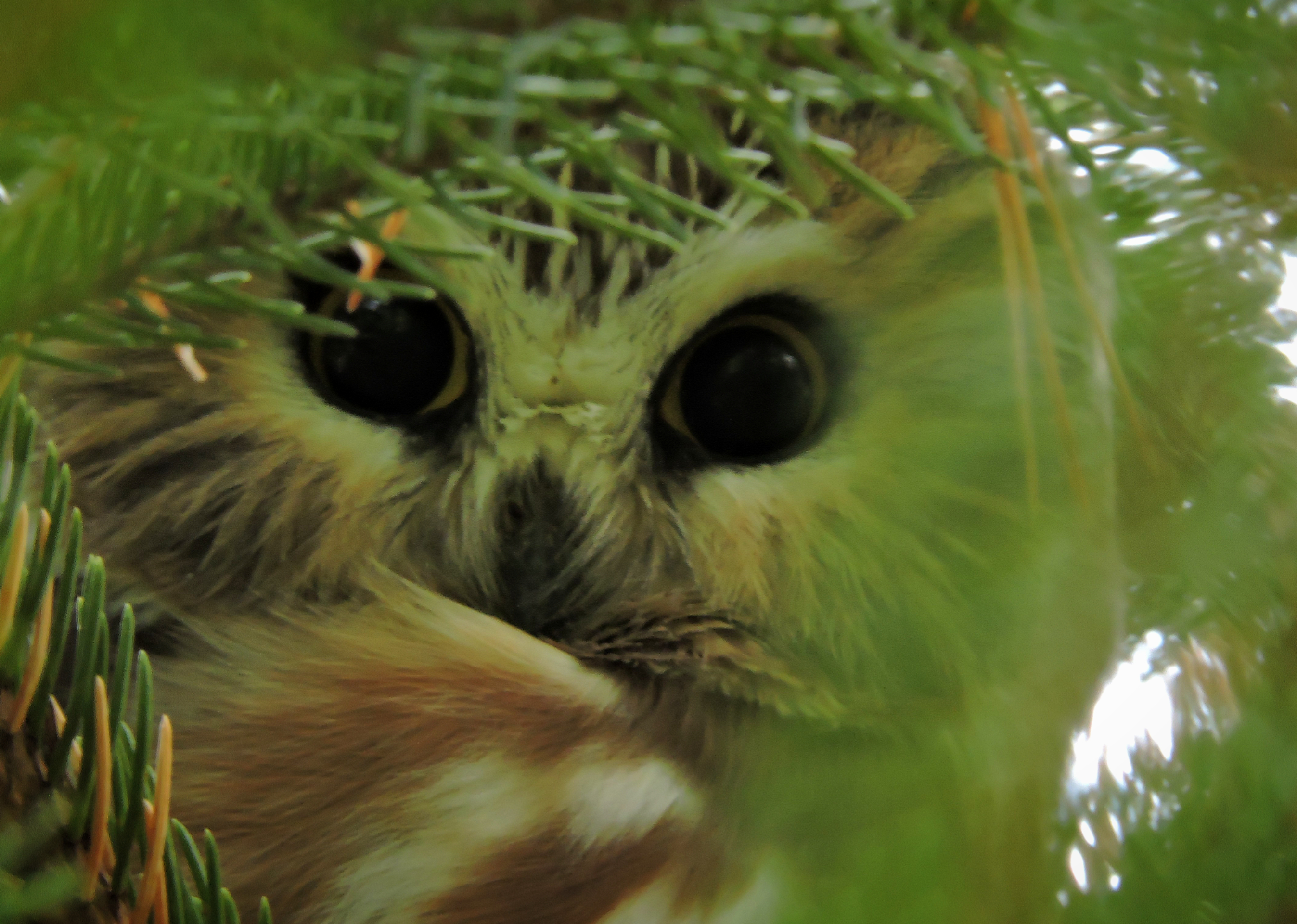
Northern Saw-whet Owl

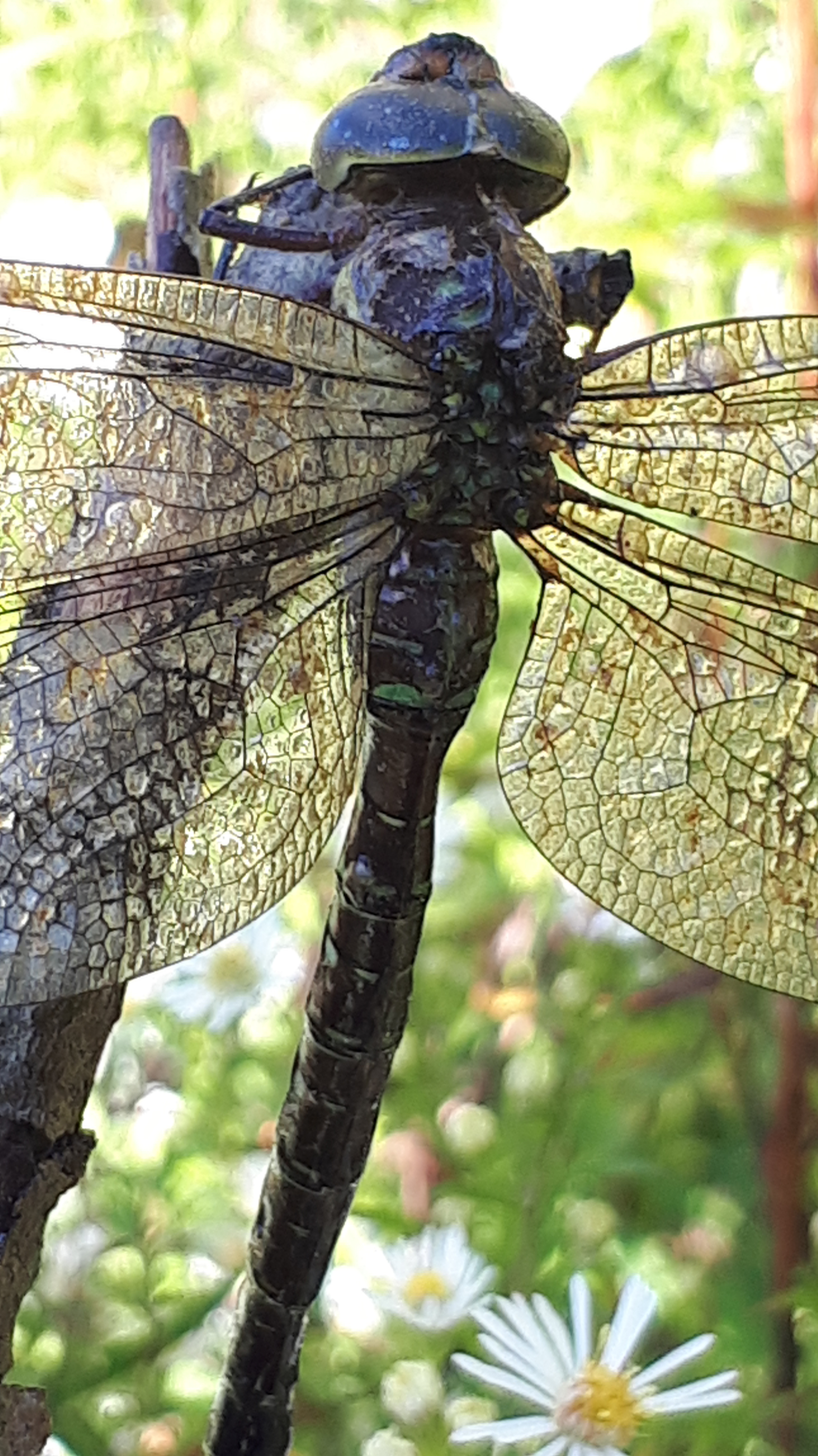
Moss-covered dragonfly

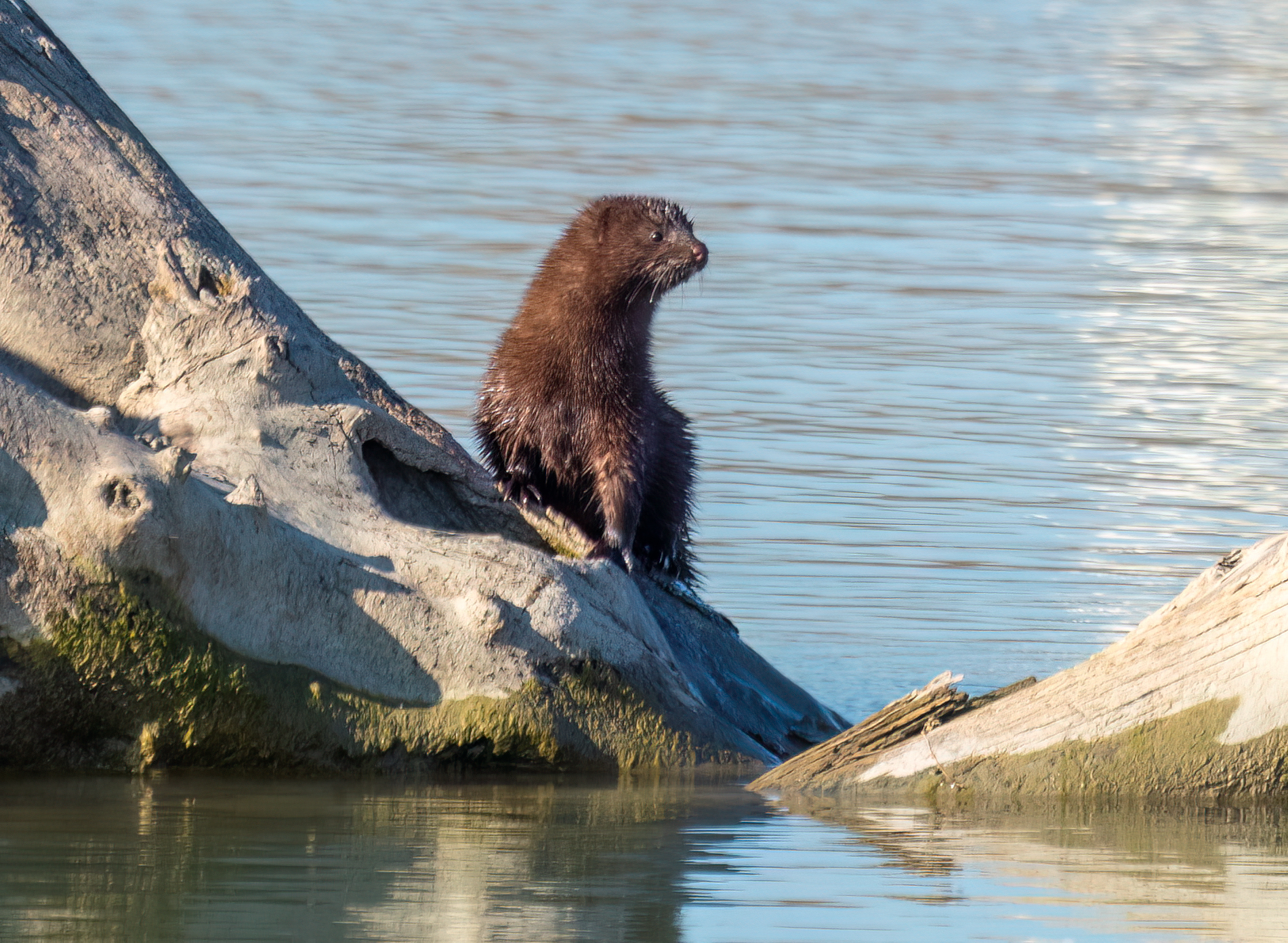
American mink

== See also ==
- Toronto waterfront
- PortsToronto
- Toronto Islands
- Toronto Harbour Light
