= James H. Lincoln =

American judge (1916–2011)

- Born: August 26, 1916; Sand Beach Township, MI
- Died: July 23, 2011; Harbor Beach, MI
- Occupations: Juvenile Court Judge, Author

James H. Lincoln (August 26, 1916 – July 23, 2011) was a Detroit City councilman, Juvenile Justice Court judge, and author residing in Harbor Beach, Michigan.

== Life and career ==
James H. Lincoln was born and raised in the community of Harbor Beach, Michigan. In 1938, he graduated from the University of Michigan where he played football, and went on to obtain a Juris Doctor degree from the Detroit College of Law in 1943. In 1953, Lincoln made an unsuccessful run for mayor of Detroit, ultimately losing to incumbent Albert Cobo. He was elected to a seat on the Detroit City Council in 1954 and retained his position until 1960, when he was appointed a probate court judge by Michigan governor G. Mennen Williams. He was later assigned to be a juvenile court judge where he served until 1977. From 1971 to 1972, Lincoln served as the president of National Council of Juvenile and Family Court Judges. Following his retirement, Wayne County named the James H. Lincoln Juvenile Justice Hall in his honor. Lincoln died in his home on Lake Huron on July 23, 2011.

== Books ==
- The Anatomy of a Riot: A Detroit Judge's Report
- Fiery Trial
