= Harbor Beach Community House =

Community center and theater in Harbor Beach, Michigan, United States

Coordinates: 43.84515°N 82.65112°W

Harbor Beach Community House is a building used for community purposes located in Harbor Beach, Michigan.

== Building ==
The building is located at the northeast corner of State Street and Huron Avenue, the main intersection in Harbor Beach, Michigan.

The Community House was built on land which had been donated by George Jenks and Anna Belle Jenks Scranton for the purpose of constructing a building to be used for community purposes. It was dedicated on September 21, 1921 and housed a theater/auditorium, gymnasium which doubled as a banquet hall with full kitchen facilities, public & school library, the city offices and Council room, as well as numerous meeting and club rooms. It also housed the Community Theatre.

The building is now home to the local movie theatre, a gymnasium and the public library. The Harbor Beach Area District Library is responsible for administration of the building. The library was established in the early 1890s, before the construction of the building, moving there when it was completed. The common rooms are in frequent use by area clubs and organizations for meetings, practices, and rehearsals. On the west face of the building is a mural, designed and executed by Dave Wiley, replacing an original mural on the building which had been lost to time and the elements. This new mural depicts local historical scenes and figures, including representations of agriculture, Frank Murphy, shipwrecks, locomotives, and much more.

== History ==
In a letter dated November 5, 1917, George J. Jenks and Anna Belle Jenks Scranton deeded Lot 34 of the Salt reserve of the City of Harbor Beach to the people for Community House purposes. By early 1918, the citizens of Harbor Beach raised $25,000 for the purpose of erecting and fitting out city offices in connection with the auditorium. This money enabled the Harbor Beach Community House Corporation to move forward, and on November 11, 1918, the Board appointed George J. Jenks and James I. Bennett to oversee the construction of the building.

Actual construction of the building didn’t begin June 1919. The first section of the building used was the theater and auditorium. On November 1, 1920, the D. W. Griffith, six-reel silent movie, “The Love Flower”, and the two-reel Harold Lloyd comedy played to a standing room only crowd. On February 4, 1921, an informal opening and housewarming took place, with the final dedication and opening celebrated on September 21, 1921.

During the next four years, the Community House became a community center. The theater and auditorium, with a seating capacity of 500, was in constant use. The American Legion, Woman’s Club, Girl Scout and Boy Scout rooms, the Community and School Library, city offices, and Council Room were centers of activity.

=== Fire and rebuilding ===
On March 17, 1926, fire destroyed one-half of the Community House. Smoke and water damaged the rest of the building. The community immediately made plans to rebuild the Community House, with rebuilding almost complete by August 1927.

The rebuilt theater, with a seating capacity of 681, was matched by no other facility in the area. The community used the new gymnasium, with seating for 500 spectators, as an arena for athletic events and as a banquet hall with full kitchen facilities. The library, with about 3000 volumes, was one of the primary enrichment centers of the area. The new city offices became a hub of governmental activity. The building was a focal point for the community and housed numerous activities. Theater attendance peaked with as many as 10,000 people going to the movies in a single month.

The 1950s brought change to the community, and as interests changed, so did their utilization of the Community House and theater. In April 1959, city offices relocated to the newly built City Hall. Construction of the new high school addition, including gym facilities, refocused the location of many community activities. The theater increasingly became a movie theater, as it remains to this day, and would keep up with modern times at its own pace, having a wider movie screen installed following the introduction of CinemaScope and other widescreen processes.

By the early 1970s, the future of the Community House looked bleak. The Community House Council had the task of reviewing operations, and making the building a viable part of the community.

On July 1, 1994, the Harbor Beach area district library became an independent governmental entity. The District Library Board now manages the operation of the Community House and Library.

== Present day ==
The Harbor Beach Community Theater, with a seating capacity of over 400, shows recent movie releases as well as being the site for concerts, live stage productions, and other community projects. Following a year-long fundraising effort which resulted in total donations of $53,000, the theater replaced its existing projector with a digital cinema projector in December 2013.

The community house is also used by local schools and the library, as well as local clubs and scouting groups.

== Community House Mural ==
A priority of the Community House Council was to recreate a mural, which had been located in the middle arch on the west side of the building. Paul Honore completed the original mural in 1930 by, and depicted various Community House activities such as athletics, dramas, and community dinners. The Council hired Dave Wiley to reproduce the mural. Before beginning work on the actual mural, Mr. Wiley created a three-dimension model depicting some of Harbor Beach’s most prominent personalities, as well as special events and highlights. James Lincoln verified the accuracy of the text.

Over a span of three years, Mr. Wiley painstakingly recreated his mural on the west wall of the Community House, utilizing the arches of the building as framing of his painting. Dedication ceremonies for the mural took place on August 2, 1992.
