= Tommy Thompson (parks commissioner) =

- Born: October 15, 1913
- Died: March 1, 1985 (71)
- Occupation: Commissioner of Parks

Thomas William Thompson (October 15, 1913 – March 1, 1985) is best known as Metropolitan Toronto's first Commissioner of Parks (from 1955 until 1981). He is known and recognized nationally and internationally for his work and his sign "Please Walk on the Grass."

His most notable achievement was the conversion of the Toronto Island into an enormous park (including a private golf course). He proposed the 12 million dollar plan to level all the buildings and revitalize the area in 1963, and work was completed in 1968.

In 1983, the northern half of the Leslie Street Spit was renamed Tommy Thompson Park in his honour.

== Biography ==
Tommy Thompson was born in Toronto on October 15, 1913. The second son of Casa Loma head gardener Robert Thompson, he was born on the grounds of one of Toronto's most famous landmarks. He graduated from the Ontario Agricultural College in Botany in 1936. He became the horticulturist for the Toronto General Burying Grounds in 1936 and later worked as the Director of Research and Development for Cedarvale Tree Experts until he joined the Royal Canadian Air Force in 1943 as a navigator bombardier. Tommy Thompson was Superintendent of Parks and Recreation for the City of Port Arthur from 1946 to 1951. He returned to Toronto to become the Adviser on Parks and Recreation Facilities in the Community Services Branch of the Ontario Department of Education in 1951. Tommy Thompson joined the newly formed Metro government in 1955 where he was appointed the first Commissioner of Parks until his retirement in 1978. He acted as Interim General Director of the Metro Toronto Zoo from 1976 and continued as General Director from 1978 until his second retirement in 1981. He died on March 1, 1985, at Toronto Western Hospital following a battle with cancer.

Tommy married his wife Beryl in 1937. They had three sons, Barry, Thomas Bryce and Randy.
