= Harbor Beach, Michigan =

- City
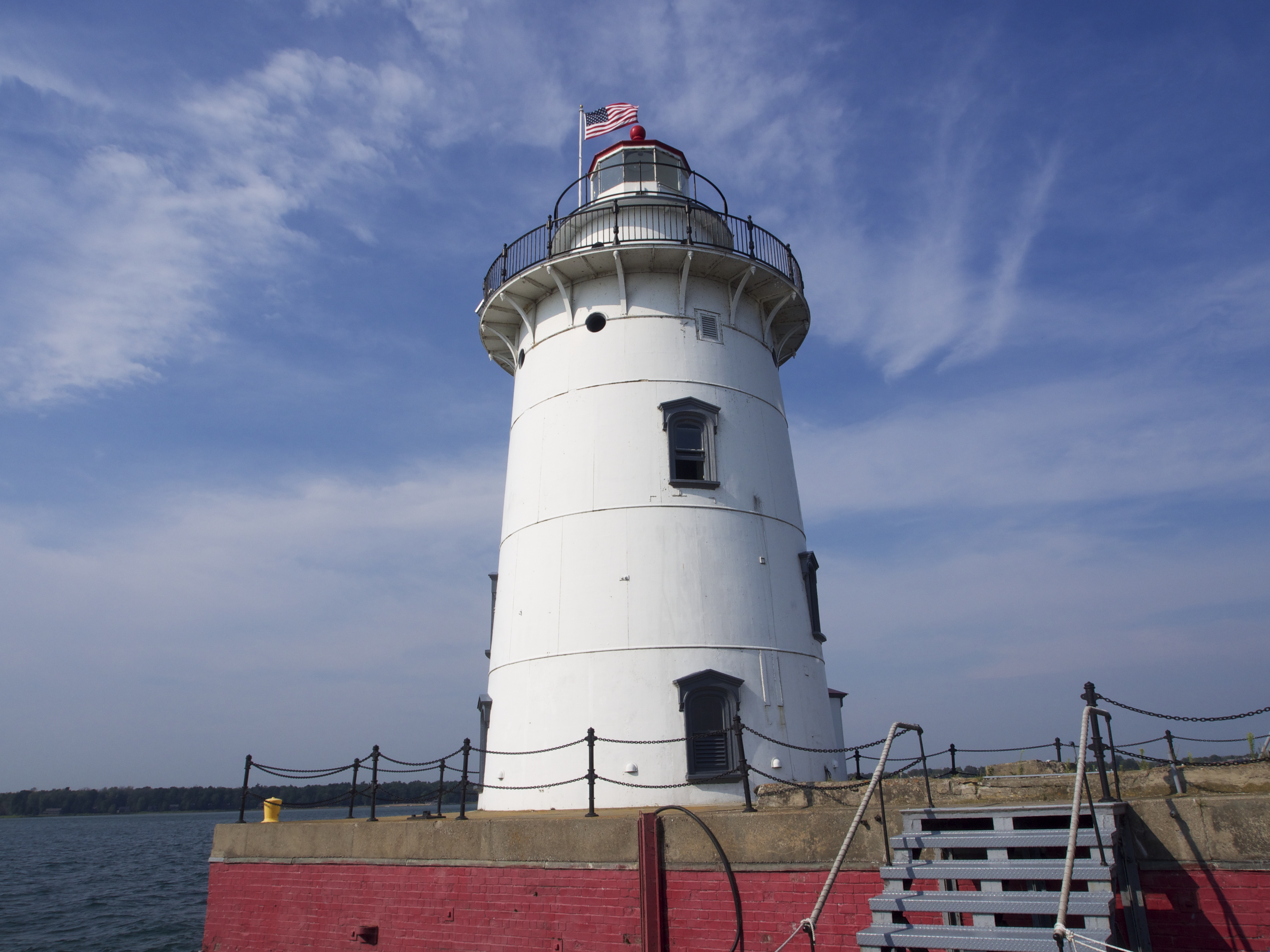
- Harbor Beach Light

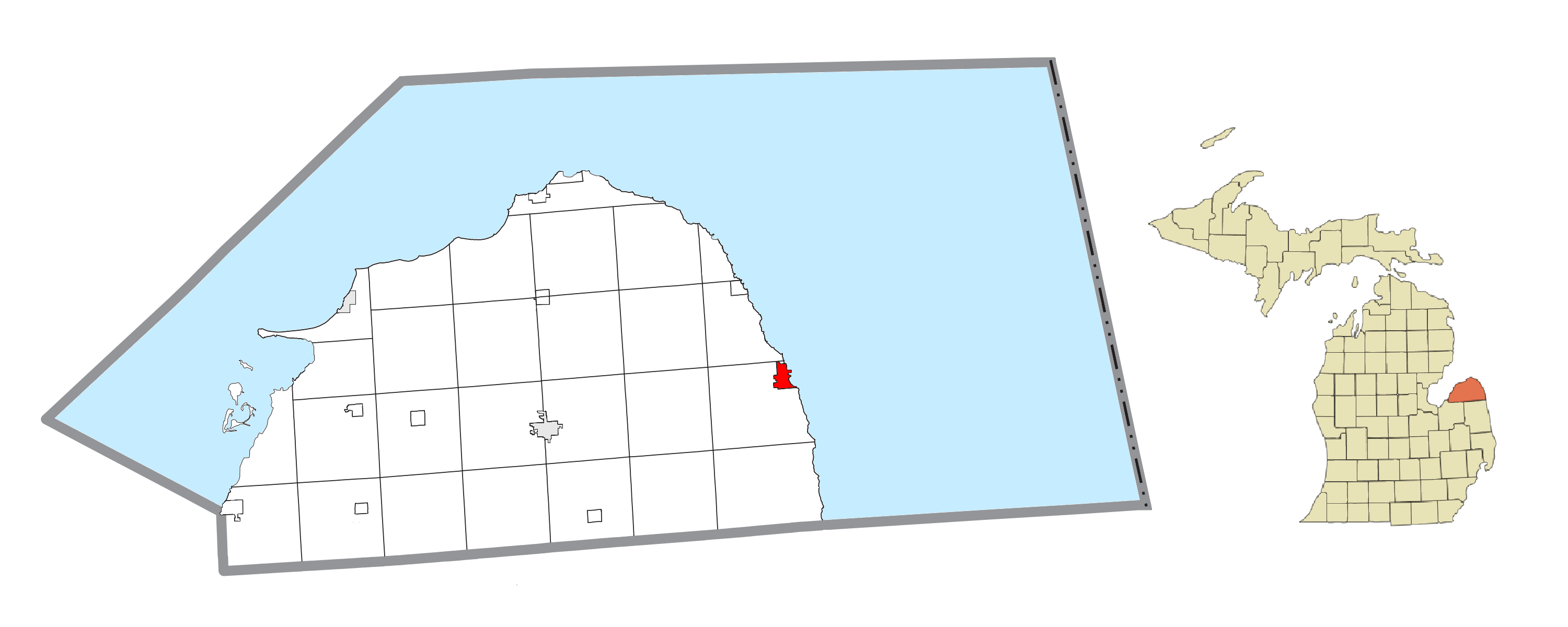
- Location within Huron County

- Location within the state of Michigan
- Coordinates: 43°50′41″N 82°39′05″W
- Country: United States
- State: Michigan
- County: Huron
- Settled: 1838
- Incorporated: 1910 (city)

Government
  - Mayor: Kevin Guitar

Area
  - Total: 2.06 sq mi (5.33 km^{2})
  - Land: 1.72 sq mi (4.46 km^{2})
  - Water: 0.34 sq mi (0.87 km^{2})
- Elevation: 600 ft (183 m)

Population (2020)
  - Total: 1,604
  - Density: 932/sq mi (359.9/km^{2})
- Time zone: UTC-5 (Eastern (EST))
  - Summer (DST): UTC-4 (EDT)
- ZIP code(s): 48441
- Area code: 989
- FIPS code: 26-36460
- GNIS feature ID: 0627752
- Website: Harbor Beach

Harbor Beach is a city in Huron County in the U.S. state of Michigan. The population was 1,604 at the 2020 census.

== History ==
The earliest settlers to this area arrived in 1837 and established a sawmill for processing lumber. The settlement eventually was named Barnettsville in 1855, as the settlement continued to grow, the town was renamed Sand Beach. In 1899, the village of Sand Beach changed its name to Harbor Beach, because of the impression that the area has nothing but sand. In 1910, it was officially incorporated into a city.

Located on the eastern shore of Lake Huron in the Thumb of Michigan, Harbor Beach is known as having the world's largest man-made fresh water harbor and boasts a fishing pier that is handicap accessible. The municipal marina provides transient services and shuttle services into the downtown area which has retained its old town charm.

The association known as HBRA was founded in 1896 as a summertime vacation spot in Harbor Beach. The resort is located roughly three hours north of Detroit, MI and is currently still operated, and frequented, by the 5th and 6th generation descendants of the original founding families.

Harbor Beach won the 2012 and 2025 Division 8 State Football Championships.

== Geography ==
- According to the United States Census Bureau, the city has a total area of 2.09 square miles (5.41 km^{2}), of which 1.75 square miles (4.53 km^{2}) is land and 0.34 square miles (0.88 km^{2}) is water.
- The world's largest man-made fresh water harbor offers a harbor of refuge to ships traveling between Port Huron and Pointe Aux Barques.
- It is considered to be part of the Thumb of Michigan, which in turn is a subregion of the Flint/Tri-Cities region.
- The two main state highways are M-25 and M-142.

== Demographics ==
Historical population
Census	Pop.	Note	%±
1880	534		—
1890	1,046		95.9%
1900	1,149		9.8%
1910	1,556		35.4%
1920	1,927		23.8%
1930	1,892		−1.8%
1940	2,186		15.5%
1950	2,349		7.5%
1960	2,282		−2.9%
1970	2,134		−6.5%
1980	2,000		−6.3%
1990	2,089		4.5%
2000	1,837		−12.1%
2010	1,703		−7.3%
2020	1,604		−5.8%
U.S. Decennial Census

=== 2020 census ===
As of the 2020 census, Harbor Beach had a population of 1,604. The median age was 47.1 years. 20.1% of residents were under the age of 18 and 25.0% of residents were 65 years of age or older. For every 100 females there were 94.2 males, and for every 100 females age 18 and over there were 89.1 males age 18 and over.

0.0% of residents lived in urban areas, while 100.0% lived in rural areas.

There were 774 households in Harbor Beach, of which 21.8% had children under the age of 18 living in them. Of all households, 38.0% were married-couple households, 23.1% were households with a male householder and no spouse or partner present, and 34.5% were households with a female householder and no spouse or partner present. About 44.3% of all households were made up of individuals and 21.3% had someone living alone who was 65 years of age or older.

There were 954 housing units, of which 18.9% were vacant. The homeowner vacancy rate was 4.3% and the rental vacancy rate was 8.8%.

Racial composition as of the 2020 census
Race	Number	Percent
White	1,479	92.2%
Black or African American	0	0.0%
American Indian and Alaska Native	12	0.7%
Asian	32	2.0%
Native Hawaiian and Other Pacific Islander	1	0.1%
Some other race	4	0.2%
Two or more races	76	4.7%
Hispanic or Latino (of any race)	29	1.8%

=== 2010 census ===
As of the census of 2010, there were 1,703 people, 774 households, and 454 families residing in the city. The population density was 973.1 inhabitants per square mile (375.7/km^{2}). There were 975 housing units at an average density of 557.1 per square mile (215.1/km^{2}). The racial makeup of the city was 96.4% White, 0.2% African American, 0.4% Native American, 1.1% Asian, 0.2% from other races, and 1.8% from two or more races. Hispanic or Latino of any race were 0.6% of the population.

There were 774 households, of which 24.0% had children under the age of 18 living with them, 43.8% were married couples living together, 11.2% had a female householder with no husband present, 3.6% had a male householder with no wife present, and 41.3% were non-families. 37.9% of all households were made up of individuals, and 22.2% had someone living alone who was 65 years of age or older. The average household size was 2.14 and the average family size was 2.80.

The median age in the city was 47.7 years. 20.4% of residents were under the age of 18; 7.4% were between the ages of 18 and 24; 19.5% were from 25 to 44; 29.9% were from 45 to 64; and 22.7% were 65 years of age or older. The gender makeup of the city was 47.5% male and 52.5% female.

=== 2000 census ===
As of the census of 2000, there were 1,837 people, 774 households, and 503 families residing in the city. The population density was 1,036.3 inhabitants per square mile (400.1/km^{2}). There were 928 housing units at an average density of 523.5 per square mile (202.1/km^{2}). The racial makeup of the city was 96.35% White, 0.11% African American, 0.49% Native American, 1.36% Asian, 0.38% from other races, and 1.31% from two or more races. Hispanic or Latino of any race were 0.93% of the population.

There were 774 households, out of which 29.5% had children under the age of 18 living with them, 51.4% were married couples living together, 10.2% had a female householder with no husband present, and 34.9% were non-families. 32.3% of all households were made up of individuals, and 16.8% had someone living alone who was 65 years of age or older. The average household size was 2.31 and the average family size was 2.92.

In the city, the population was spread out, with 24.5% under the age of 18, 6.8% from 18 to 24, 23.8% from 25 to 44, 22.9% from 45 to 64, and 22.1% who were 65 years of age or older. The median age was 42 years. For every 100 females, there were 91.4 males. For every 100 females age 18 and over, there were 86.9 males.

The median income for a household in the city was $29,469, and the median income for a family was $35,263. Males had a median income of $29,938 versus $18,864 for females. The per capita income for the city was $14,917. About 11.2% of families and 15.1% of the population were below the poverty line, including 24.8% of those under age 18 and 12.2% of those age 65 or over.

== Climate ==
Climate data for Harbor Beach, Michigan (1991–2020 normals, extremes 1899–present)
Month	Jan	Feb	Mar	Apr	May	Jun	Jul	Aug	Sep	Oct	Nov	Dec	Year
Record high °F (°C)	62 (17)	68 (20)	84 (29)	89 (32)	92 (33)	100 (38)	105 (41)	102 (39)	98 (37)	88 (31)	80 (27)	65 (18)	105 (41)
Mean daily maximum °F (°C)	28.7 (−1.8)	30.3 (−0.9)	38.5 (3.6)	49.1 (9.5)	60.5 (15.8)	70.6 (21.4)	76.6 (24.8)	75.9 (24.4)	69.9 (21.1)	57.7 (14.3)	45.0 (7.2)	34.2 (1.2)	53.1 (11.7)
Daily mean °F (°C)	22.3 (−5.4)	22.9 (−5.1)	31.0 (−0.6)	41.1 (5.1)	52.2 (11.2)	62.2 (16.8)	68.1 (20.1)	67.4 (19.7)	61.0 (16.1)	49.7 (9.8)	38.4 (3.6)	28.6 (−1.9)	45.4 (7.4)
Mean daily minimum °F (°C)	15.9 (−8.9)	15.6 (−9.1)	23.4 (−4.8)	33.1 (0.6)	43.8 (6.6)	53.9 (12.2)	59.6 (15.3)	58.9 (14.9)	52.0 (11.1)	41.6 (5.3)	31.7 (−0.2)	23.0 (−5.0)	37.7 (3.2)
Record low °F (°C)	−19 (−28)	−22 (−30)	−12 (−24)	3 (−16)	24 (−4)	32 (0)	38 (3)	35 (2)	21 (−6)	10 (−12)	4 (−16)	−14 (−26)	−22 (−30)
Average precipitation inches (mm)	2.40 (61)	2.05 (52)	1.90 (48)	3.60 (91)	3.20 (81)	3.34 (85)	3.03 (77)	3.30 (84)	3.19 (81)	3.05 (77)	2.64 (67)	2.27 (58)	33.97 (863)
Average snowfall inches (cm)	15.4 (39)	11.2 (28)	6.0 (15)	1.4 (3.6)	0.0 (0.0)	0.0 (0.0)	0.0 (0.0)	0.0 (0.0)	0.0 (0.0)	0.0 (0.0)	1.7 (4.3)	11.5 (29)	47.2 (120)
Average precipitation days (≥ 0.01 in)	16.4	11.1	9.7	11.5	11.5	10.2	9.0	9.6	9.5	13.8	13.0	14.5	139.8
Average snowy days (≥ 0.1 in)	10.0	7.6	3.8	1.0	0.0	0.0	0.0	0.0	0.0	0.1	1.5	7.0	31.0
Source: NOAA

== Notable people ==
- Frank Murphy, governor of Michigan, U.S. attorney general, and associate justice of the U.S. Supreme Court
- Dick Lange, Major League Baseball pitcher for the California Angels
- James H. Lincoln, judge, author, and member of the Detroit City Council
- Louis J. Sebille, World War II and Korean War pilot, Medal of Honor recipient

== Government ==
The government of Harbor Beach is organized under the City Charter of 1965 and operates under a Mayor/Council form of government. The City Council consists of the Mayor, who is elected every two years, and four Council members, who are elected for four-year terms.

- Mayor Kevin Guitar
- Mayor Pro-Temp Sam Capling
- Council member Adam Wood
- Council member Matt Woodke
- Council member Will Woodward
- Harbor Beach has a sister city in Canada:

== Attractions ==
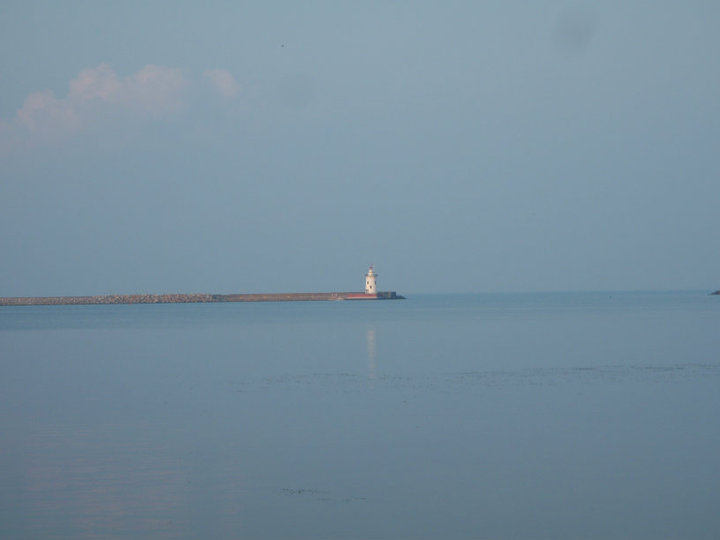
Harbor Beach Light from Bathing Beach Park

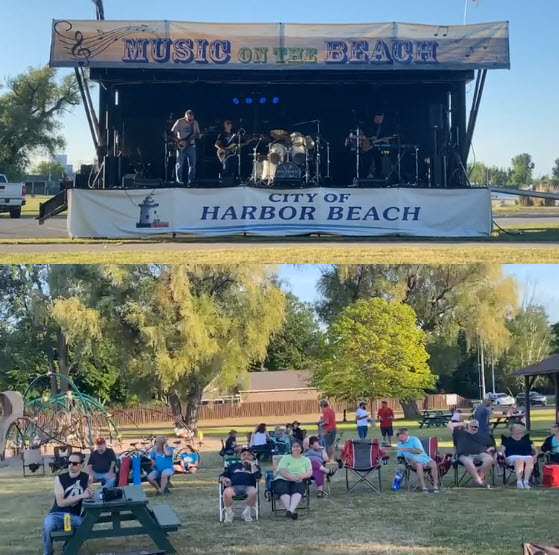
A band performing at James H. Lincoln Park

- The Harbor Beach Light is located at the end of the north breakwater entrance to the harbor of refuge, created by the U.S. Army Corps of Engineers, protecting the harbor of Harbor Beach, Michigan. Tours are available on Saturdays during the summer.
- The Harbor Beach Community House is located at the main intersection in Harbor Beach. On the west face of the building is a mural that depicts local historical scenes and figures, including representations of agriculture, Frank Murphy, shipwrecks, locomotives, and much more.
- The Grice House Museum offers a glimpse at life in the past, while preserving history for future generations.
- Frank Murphy Memorial Museum and home. The birthplace of Frank Murphy and law office of Murphy's father.
- The Harbor Beach open-air Farmers Market is open on the grounds of the historic Frank Murphy's Museum from 2:00 P.M. until 7:00 P.M. every Friday during the summer months through October 7.
- James H. Lincoln Park hosts "Music on the Beach" every Friday night from mid-June to mid-August.

== Education ==
- Harbor Beach Community Schools
- Harbor Beach Elementary School
- Harbor Beach Middle School
- Harbor Beach High School
  - Lucille H. McCollough is an alumnus
- Our Lady Of Lake Huron School
- Zion Lutheran School

== Registered Historic Places ==
National Register of Historic Places Places
Historic Place	Added	Number	Address	Historic Significance	Area of Significance	Period of Significance	Owner:	Historic Function	Historic Sub-function	Current Function
Grice House Museum	1982	82000534	865 N. Huron Ave., Harbor Beach	Architecture, Engineering	Politics, Government, Architecture, Industry	1875–1899	Local Gov't	Domestic	Single Dwelling	Museum
Harbor Beach Lighthouse	1983	83000850	Breakwater Entrance, Harbor Beach	Event, Architecture, Engineering	Architecture, Maritime History, Engineering, Transportation	1875–1899	Federal	Transportation	Water-Related	Water-Related
Frank Murphy Birthplace	1971	71000394	142 S. Huron St., Harbor Beach	Frank Murphy	Social History, Politics, Government	1875–1899	Private, Local Government	Commerce, Trade, Domestic	Professional, Single Dwelling	Museum
Navigation Structures at Harbor Beach Harbor	1997	97000972	N. Lakeshore Dr., Harbor Beach	Architecture, Engineering, Event	Industry, Engineering	1875–1899, 1900–1924, 1925–1949	Federal	Transportation	Water-Related	Water-Related

== See also ==
- Shipwrecks of the 1913 Great Lakes storm
