= Harbor Beach Light =

Lighthouse in Michigan, United States

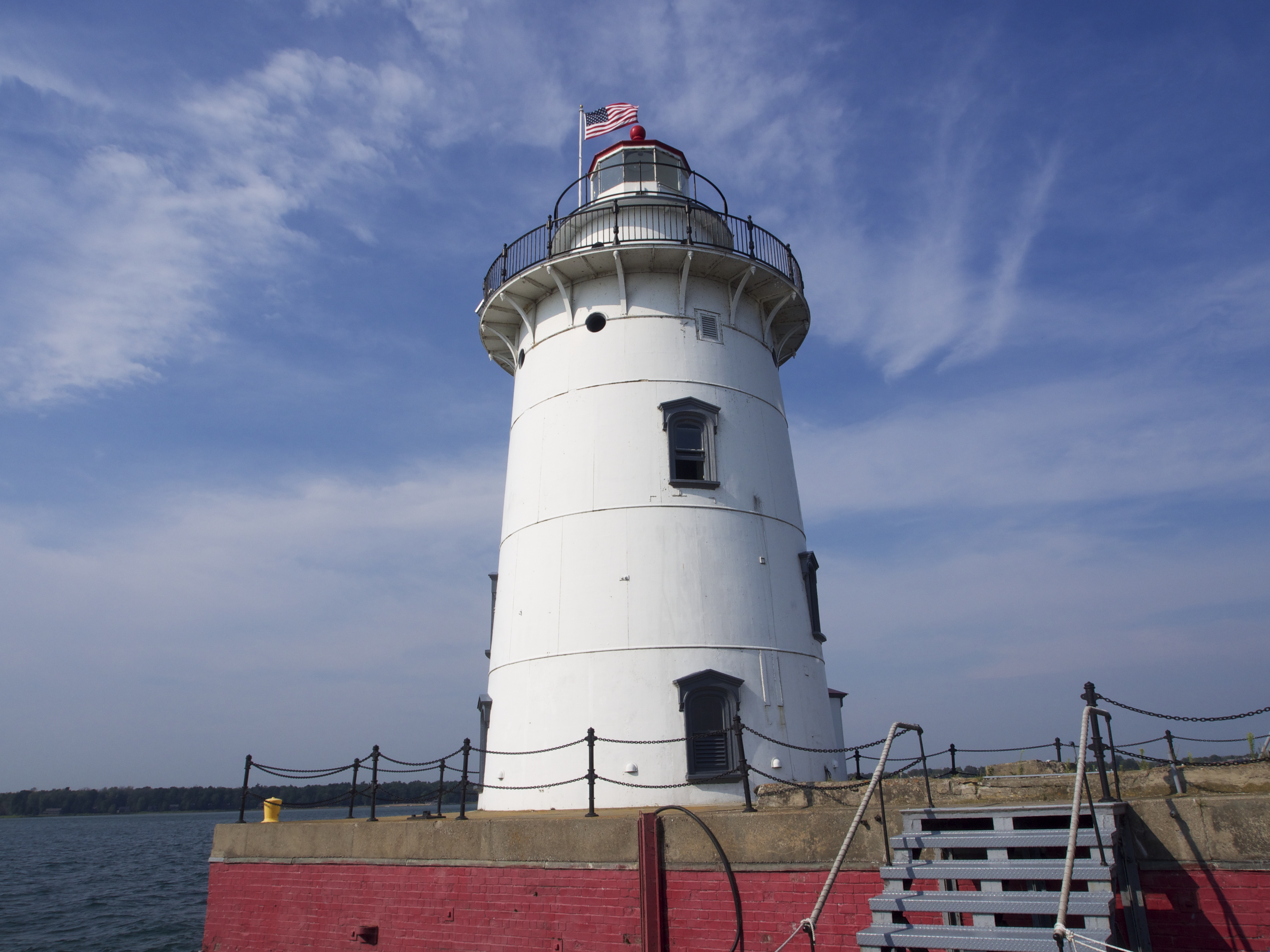
- The lighthouse in 2014
- Location: Northside breakwater Harbor Beach, Michigan
- Coordinates: 43°50′42″N 82°37′54″W

Tower
- Constructed: 1858
- Construction: Cast iron, brick lining
- Automated: 1968
- Height: 45 feet (14 m)
- Shape: Frustum of a cone
- Markings: White with red roof on lantern
- Heritage: National Register of Historic Places listed place
- Fog signal: HORN: 1 blast ev 30s (3s bl). Operational remotely all year.

Light
- First lit: 1885
- Focal height: 54 feet (16 m)
- Lens: Fourth-order Fresnel lens (original), VRB-25 acrylic (current)
- Intensity: 20,000 candlepower
- Range: Red 16 nautical miles (30 km; 18 mi), white 19 nautical miles (35 km; 22 mi)
- Characteristic: Al WR 10s
- Harbor Beach Lighthouse
- U.S. National Register of Historic Places
- Michigan Historic Landmark
- Area: 0.1 acres (0.040 ha)
- Built: 1884
- MPS: U.S. Coast Guard Lighthouses and Light Stations on the Great Lakes TR
- NRHP reference No.: 83000850
- Added to NRHP: August 04, 1983

The Harbor Beach Lighthouse is a "sparkplug lighthouse" located at the end of the north breakwall entrance to the harbor of refuge on Lake Huron. The breakwall and light were created by the United States Army Corps of Engineers to protect the harbor of Harbor Beach, Michigan, which is the largest man-made freshwater harbor in the world. Harbor Beach is located on the eastern edge of the Thumb of Huron County, in the state of Michigan.

== History ==
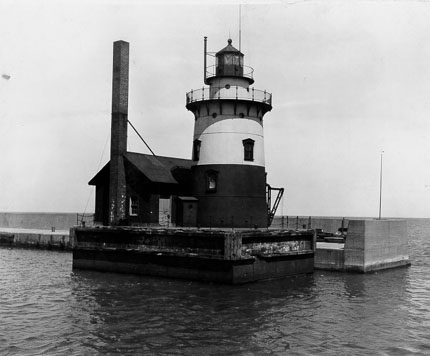
Undated photo by the US Coast Guard.

Prior to the 1900s, this port was a major harbor of refuge and was the home of one of the most active lifesaving crews on Lake Huron. In the 1880s, a massive breakwater extension was constructed and many lake boats took shelter. Dozens of shipwrecks lie around the area, evidence of the boats that tried, but did not make, the shelter.

Since 1885, the Harbor Beach Breakwater Lighthouse has been an area of refuge to ships caught in the fury of Mother Nature and Lake Huron during stormy seas. This lighthouse replaced the wood skeleton lighthouse which was built in 1877.

The new lighthouse was built on a timber foundation crib. It is a conical, brick structure encased in cast iron plates. The building was originally painted brown; it thereafter went through iterations where it had a black parapet and lantern. At the top a round cast-iron watch room supports a ten-sided, cast iron lantern. The light sits 54 feet (16 m) above the harbor and can be seen for up to 16 nautical miles (30 km; 18 mi) out to sea. A concrete cap, partially faced with brick veneer, supports the 45-foot (14 m) tower. Below the brick veneer, extending to the lake bottom is a timber cribbing filled with 100 to 300 pounds (45 to 136 kg) stones, which provides the necessary counterweight needed to prevent the structure from overturning or sliding.

The light shares its design and engineering with the Detroit River Light which was also built in 1885.

In the lighthouse, the first deck housed a kitchen with a cook stove and also was a living area. The next two decks were sleeping quarters. The second deck was for the assistants, the third deck for the keeper. The fourth deck was used as a workroom and fifth was the watch room at the balcony level. The lantern room is located at the top on the sixth deck. This housed the original Fresnel lens, made by Barbier & Fenstre in Paris in 1884, which is now on display at the Grice House and Museum in Harbor Beach. Next to the Harbor Beach lighthouse was a small wooden building, which contained equipment to operate the fog signal (see undated USCG photo above), but was removed when the light was automated. There is a diaphone in place.

The Great Storm of 1913 substantially undermined the pier's foundation, necessitating repairs.

== Current activities ==
Today, the lighthouse is automated and operated remotely, year round, by the United States Coast Guard in Saginaw, Michigan, and is a welcome sight for the many recreational boaters and commercial fishermen that travel Lake Huron between Port Huron and the Saginaw Bay area. In 1967, the fourth order Fresnel lens was removed, and replaced with a 12-inch (300 mm) Vega acrylic optic. The light and fog signal have been solar-powered since 2006. The light is powered with a 20,000 candlepower bulb and the red beam flashes every seven seconds with a visibility of 16 miles (26 km). A fog signal is available by calling channel 79, and keying five times, causing the fog signal to sound with a three-second blast every thirty seconds, which will continue for forty-five minutes.

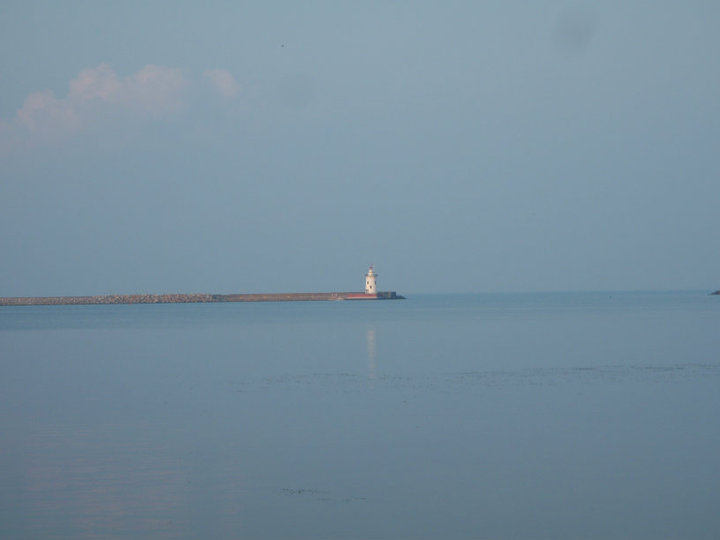
Harbor Beach Light from Bathing Beach Park

The City of Harbor Beach is now the owner of the Harbor Beach Lighthouse. Ceremonies to transfer ownership of the historic structure took place in Traverse City on June 16, 2010. A local ceremony took place July 31, 2010. The Harbor Beach Lighthouse Preservation Society (HBLPS) was formed in 1984 and restoration is ongoing. The lighthouse has been waterproofed, ventilated, and its floors, interior walls, and windows restored to original appearance.

The Light is listed on the National Register of Historic Places, Reference #83000850 HARBOR BEACH LIGHTHOUSE (U.S. COAST GUARD/GREAT LAKES TR), and is also on the State List.

== Getting there ==
From M-25 (Huron Avenue) in Harbor Beach, turn east on Trescott Street and follow to its end at Bathing Beach Park. A distant view of the lighthouse is available from the end of Trescott pier. The Marina and Waterworks Park, on the north end of the city, also offers a view of the lighthouse.

== Lighthouse and harbor timeline ==
Lighthouse and Harbor Timeline
Date	Event
1872	Sand Beach Selected for a harbor of refuge.
1873	Construction begins on the breakwall. Jenks and Co. builds a dock in the harbor.
1876	The first lighthouse is constructed. It is a skeletal structure with a lamp room and one other small room below. Willis Graves is the first light keeper. Between 1877 and 1899, 47,460 ships took shelter in the Sand Beach Harbor of Refuge.
1878	Loren Trescott appointed Light Keeper. He remained the keeper for 34 years.
1880	Lamp converted to kerosene; burned as bright, but less expensive than lard oil.
1881	Sand Beach Life Saving Station built.
1882	Captain Wagstaff appointed Harbor Master.
1884	Foundation for new light house built west of the breakwall, north of the main entrance.
1885	Current lighthouse built, original light moved to north entrance. South pier light established.
1898	Captain Rice appointed Harbor Master.
1899	Sand Beach renamed to Harbor Beach.
1904	After years of repairing storm damage, the wood superstructure was replaced with concrete.
1909	Life Saving Station moved to the Jenks Dock.
1913	Storm of November 1913 does $300,000 damage to the breakwall. Hundreds of sailors killed as their ships sink or are destroyed.
1914	Illuminating apparatus within the lens was upgraded from oil wick to incandescent oil vapor.
1919	The 10-inch (250 mm) steam boilers and 10 inch whistles were removed from the fog signal building and replaced by a pair of Type "F" diaphones.
1920	U.S. Coast Guard takes over Harbor Master duties. Archibald Davidson appointed lighthouse keeper.
1935	U.S. Coast Guard station built 300 yards (270 m) off shore in the harbor. Otto Both appointed Lighthouse keeper.
1935	Installation of a radio beacon at the station.
1940	Thomas Radcliff appointed Lighthouse keeper. Later in the decade the Coast Guard takes over operation of the lighthouse.
1967	The lighthouse is operated remotely from shore. Last year for anyone to live in the lighthouse.
1984	The Harbor Beach Lighthouse and Breakwall Preservation Society formed.
1987	Another storm damaged the lighthouse and breakwater, causing several millions of dollars in damage.
1988	Repairs were completed. Canadian Vicki Keith started from Harbor Beach in her historic swim across Lake Huron.
1996	The Original Fourth Order Fresnel Lens was replaced.
1999	The Coast Guard restored the crib foundation.

== See also ==
- Lighthouses in the United States
