= M-53 (Michigan highway) =

State highway in Michigan, United States

M-53
- M-53 highlighted in red

Route information
- Maintained by MDOT
- Length: 120.980 mi (194.698 km)
- Existed: c. July 1, 1919–present

Major junctions
- South end: M-3 in Detroit
- I-94 in Detroit; M-102 at Detroit–Warren; I-696 at Center Line-Warren; M-59 in Utica; I-69 near Imlay City; M-90 in Burnside; M-46 near Kingston; M-81 near Cass City; M-142 in Bad Axe
- North end: M-25 in Port Austin

Location
- Country: United States
- State: Michigan
- Counties: Wayne, Macomb, Lapeer, Sanilac, Huron

Highway system
- Michigan State Trunkline Highway System; Interstate; US; State; Byways
← M-52	→ M-54

M-53 is a north–south state trunkline highway in the US state of Michigan that connects Detroit to The Thumb region. The highway starts in Detroit at a connection with M-3 and ends in Port Austin, Michigan at M-25. In between, the trunkline passes through the northern suburbs of Metro Detroit, connects to freeways like Interstate 69 (I-69) and provides access to rural farmland. In Macomb County, M-53 follows the Christopher Columbus Freeway and POW/MIA Memorial Freeway, while the remainder of the highway is known as Van Dyke Avenue in the metro area or Van Dyke Road elsewhere. The highway has also been named the Earle Memorial Highway after one of the pioneers of the Good Roads Movement and Michigan's highway system.

When the first state highways were signed in the field in 1919, M-53 was one of them, running from Detroit to Elkton. In the 1920s, the highway was extended northward to connect with Port Austin. Later improvements through 1940 realigned a section of the roadway near Imlay City and completed paving. With planning and construction during the 1950s and 1960s, the state converted portions of the road north of Detroit to have divided highway and freeway segments. The freeway bypass of Romeo was started in the 1990s and finished to its current state in 2003.

== Route description ==
Starting at the intersection between Van Dyke Avenue and M-3 (Gratiot Avenue), M-53 runs north-northwesterly along Van Dyke in the city of Detroit. The four-lane roadway passes through residential neighborhoods on the city's east side. About a half mile (0.8 km) north of its start, M-53 meets I-94 at the latter's exit 218. On the opposite side of the freeway interchange, Van Dyke Avenue turns due north and continues through a mix of residential and industrial areas near Coleman A. Young International Airport. In this area, the highway crosses branch lines for both the Conrail Shared Assets Operations and the Canadian National Railway. M-53 continues northward through residential areas north of 6 Mile Road and crosses from Detroit into Warren at the junction with 8 Mile Road; that road also marks the Wayne–Macomb county line. The highway passes through the middle of Center Line, an enclave surrounded by Warren. On the northern edge of Center Line, M-53 meets exit 23 along I-696, the Walter Reuther Freeway. North of this interchange, Van Dyke Avenue crosses back into Warren and continues northward. The highway is paralleled by a Conrail line as they both pass through the northern Detroit suburbs. Between 12 Mile and 14 Mile roads, M-53 passes next to the General Motors Technical Center and through the center of a suburban shopping district. The roadway widens out into a divided highway as it continues northward, crossing into Sterling Heights at 14 Mile Road. The highway is bounded by additional commercial and light industrial properties as it intersects Metropolitan Parkway (16 Mile Road).

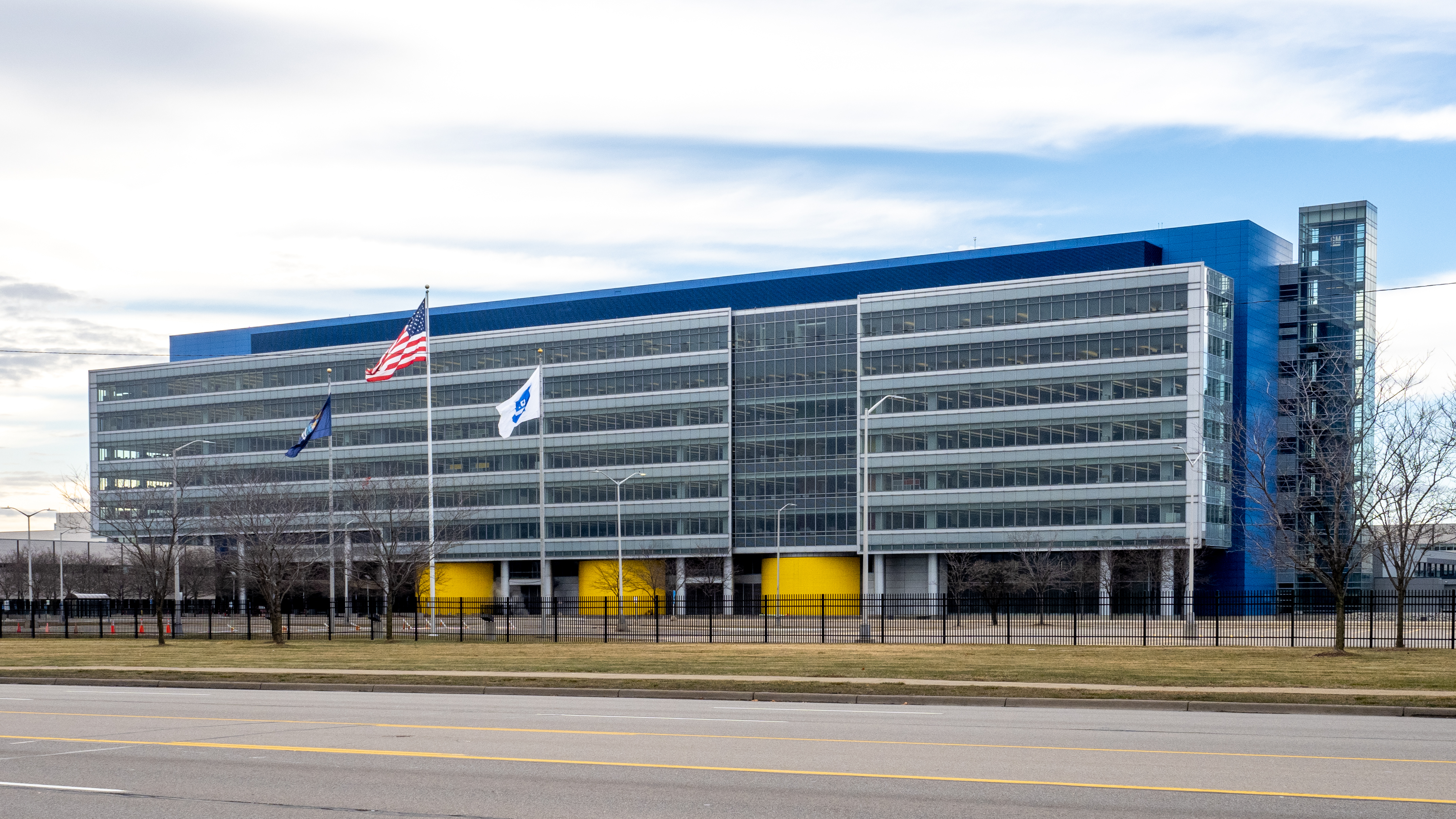
The General Motors Technical Center next to M-53 in Warren

Near 18 Mile Road, M-53 curves to the northeast and separates from Van Dyke Avenue. This separation is marked by an interchange as M-53 also transitions into a full, four-lane freeway. The interchange, numbered exit 15, connects to a roundabout junction with 18½ Mile Road and Van Dyke Avenue. M-53, now named either the Van Dyke Freeway or the Christopher Columbus Freeway, crosses the Clinton River before resuming a northward course, passing to the east side of Utica in Shelby Township. M-53 runs about one mile (1.6 km) to the east of Van Dyke Avenue through the area, and north of the 23 Mile Road interchange, it curves northwesterly to draw closer to Van Dyke. The landscape is mostly residential subdivisions with parks and golf courses as the freeway exits Metro Detroit proper. There is one last interchange near 28 Mile Road where the freeway meets Van Dyke Road, as it is now called and the Columbus Freeway designation is dropped. M-53 turns northeasterly, running as an expressway, with at-grade intersections for access at the key cross roads instead of full interchanges. The expressway section bypasses Romeo to its east, passing between the city and the Romeo State Airport. The highway is also known as the POW/MIA Memorial Freeway. There are intersections for 30 and 32 Mile roads before the highway curves to the northwest and transitions back to a rural undivided, two-lane, highway near 34 Mile Road. The POW/MIA Freeway designation drops at this point, and M-53 follows Van Dyke Road north and northwesterly through rural northern Macomb County.

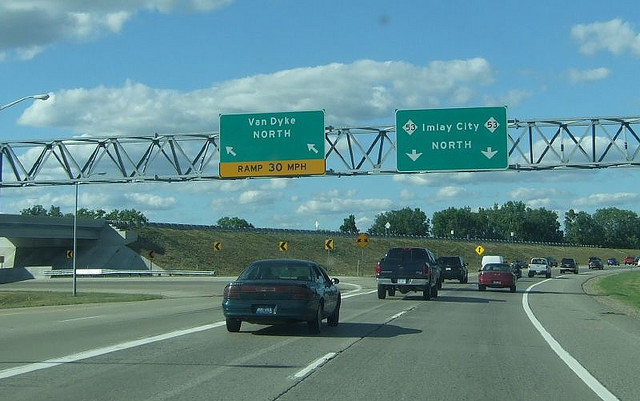
Southern end of the Christopher Columbus Freeway at the interchange with Van Dyke Road

North of Romeo, the trunkline passes through agricultural areas of The Thumb region of the state. M-53 crosses into Lapeer County south of Almont. Further north, Van Dyke Road meets I-69 in Imlay City, running through the downtown area north of the Interstate; Imlay City is also the location of a crossing of the Canadian National Railway line that carries Amtrak's Blue Water service between Flint and Port Huron. In the unincorporated community of Burnside, M-53 intersects M-90. The two highways run concurrently for about a mile and a half (2.4 km) before separating. M-53 continues northward and crosses into Sanilac County near Marlette. In that city, the highway crosses a branch line of the Huron and Eastern Railway (HESR) before continuing through downtown. From Marlette northward, M-53 runs parallel to, and about a mile east of, the Sanilac–Tuscola county line. The highway follows Van Dyke Road through rural farming country past intersections with M-46 and M-81 and across the Cass River before crossing into Huron County.

About six miles (9.7 km) into Huron County, the highway turns to the northeast. Near Bad Axe, Van Dyke Road curves again, turning due east into town where it becomes Huron Street. At downtown, M-53 turns north on Port Crescent Street, joining with M-142. The two highways cross another branch line of the HESR. Outside of town, the street name changes back to Van Dyke Road, and M-142 separates to the west. M-53 now follows Van Dyke Road, which is paralleled by a HESR line as far north as Kinde. The highway continues further along, meandering toward the northeast as it approaches Port Austin. M-25 merges in from the east at Grindstone Road, and the two highways run together north along Lake Street into town. At the intersection with Spring Street, M-25 turns west to follow the shoreline of Saginaw Bay, and M-53 terminates.

M-53 is maintained by MDOT like other state highways in Michigan. As a part of these maintenance responsibilities, the department tracks the volume of traffic that uses the roadways under its jurisdiction. These volumes are expressed using a metric called annual average daily traffic, which is a statistical calculation of the average daily number of vehicles on a segment of roadway. MDOT's surveys in 2010 showed that the highest traffic levels along M-53 were the 62,594 vehicles daily between the southern end of the freeway and M-59; the lowest counts were the 1,964 vehicles per day north of Kinde. M-53 between M-3 in Detroit and the northern M-142 junction near Bad Axe has been listed on the National Highway System, a network of roads important to the country's economy, defense, and mobility.

== History ==
M-53 was first designated by 1919; it started at Gratiot Avenue in Detroit running north through Centerline, and Utica to eventually end east of Elkton on M-31. An extension in 1926 moved the northern terminus to Port Austin along the former M-19. A new route near Imlay City was opened in 1932, with the southern section of the bypass opened in 1937. The trunkline was completely paved by 1940 when the last 11 miles (18 km) were paved in Huron and Sanilac counties.

The first divided highway section was completed in 1952 in Warren, with an additional two miles (3.2 km) completed the following year, completing the divided highway between 12 Mile and 17 Mile roads. In November 1965, full freeway segments were opened between 18 Mile and 27½ Mile roads near Utica and Romeo. The plans at the time were to extend the freeway west one mile to Mound Road and then have it continue south along the Mound Road corridor into Detroit to connect with the Davison Freeway and I-96. Construction started on the Romeo Bypass in 1989. Completed in 1992, the bypass extended a two-lane expressway to 34 Mile Road. Further construction on the remaining two lanes was started in 2002. When it was finished in 2003, the highway had two remaining intersections but is otherwise a limited-access freeway. The old highway was transferred to local control and removed from the state trunkline highway system.

== Memorial highway designations ==
The freeway section of M-53 is officially known as the Christopher Columbus Freeway as a nod to Macomb County's large Italian American population. This designation was approved by the Michigan Legislature in 1978. The expressway section that bypasses Romeo is known as the POW/MIA Memorial Freeway in honor of American prisoners of war and those who were and are missing in action. The remainder has been named Van Dyke Avenue or Van Dyke Road. That name honors James A. Van Dyke, a prominent attorney in Detroit in the 19th century. Van Dyke was the prosecutor for Wayne County, as well as both city attorney and mayor of Detroit. The street through Detroit was named in his honor, and as the highway was extended northward, the name was carried with it.

The last name applied to M-53 is the Earle Memorial Highway, named in honor of Horatio Earle, Michigan's first State Highway Commissioner. Earle was instrumental in the early Good Roads Movement in the state and the creation of the Michigan State Highway Department, which is now MDOT. When the original legislation creating a highway agency was declared unconstitutional in 1903, he kept the job in an unofficial capacity until the Legislature could rectify the situation. Earle designated that the first mile of state reward road in The Thumb, and residents formed a group to lobby to have the road named in his honor. The State Highway Commissioner Murray Van Wagoner designated M-53 in Earle's memory in April 1939, and the Legislature legislation two years later honoring him, but not officially naming the road. That was corrected in 2001 when the statutes naming various highways in the state were consolidated, and M-53 was officially designated the Earle Memorial Highway.

== Major intersections ==
County	Location	mi	km	Exit	Destinations	Notes
Wayne	Detroit	0.000	0.000		M-3 (Gratiot Avenue) – Roseville, Downtown Detroit	
Wayne	Detroit	0.576	0.927		I-94 – Port Huron, Chicago	Exit 218 on I-94
Wayne–Macomb county line	Detroit–Warren city line	4.886– 4.906	7.863– 7.895		M-102 (8 Mile Road)	8 Mile Road is the county line
Macomb	Center Line–Warren city line	7.890– 7.904	12.698– 12.720		I-696 – Port Huron, Lansing	Exit 23 on I-696
Macomb	Sterling Heights	12.985– 13.014	20.897– 20.944		Metropolitan Parkway (16 Mile Road)	
Macomb	Sterling Heights	15.116	24.327	South end of freeway		
Macomb	Sterling Heights	15.279	24.589	15	Van Dyke Avenue north, 18 ½ Mile Road west	
Macomb	Sterling Heights	17.530– 17.580	28.212– 28.292	17	M-59 (Hall Road) – Mt. Clemens, Pontiac	Signed as 17A (east) and 17B (west) northbound
Macomb	Shelby Charter Township	20.583	33.125	20	23 Mile Road	Signed as 20A (east) and 20B (west) northbound
Macomb	Shelby–Washington township line	23.732	38.193	23	26 Mile Road	Signed as 23A (east) and 23B (west) northbound
Macomb	Washington Township	25.033	40.287	25	Van Dyke Avenue – Romeo	Channelized intersection; no exit number southbound; no northbound entrance; northern end of freeway and southern end of expressway
Macomb	Washington Township	28.005	45.070		30 Mile Road	Cross intersection
Macomb	Romeo	30.176	48.564		32 Mile Road – Downtown Romeo	Cross intersection
Macomb	Bruce Township	31.145	50.123		33 Mile Road, McKay Road	Northbound exit and entrance only
Macomb	Bruce Township	32.007	51.510	Northern end of expressway		
Lapeer	Imlay City	44.973– 44.998	72.377– 72.417		I-69 – Port Huron, Flint	Exit 168 on I-69
Lapeer	Burnside	59.558	95.849		M-90 east – Brown City	Southern end of M-90 concurrency
Lapeer	Burnside Township	61.044	98.241		M-90 west – North Branch	Northern end of M-90 concurrency
Sanilac	Lamotte Township	73.691	118.594		M-46 – Sandusky, Saginaw	
Sanilac	Greenleaf Township	86.703	139.535		M-81 west – Caro	Eastern terminus of M-81
Huron	Bad Axe	103.855	167.138		M-142 east (Sand Beach Road) – Harbor Beach	Southern end of M-142 concurrency
Huron	Colfax Township	105.345	169.536		M-142 west – Elkton	Northern end of M-142 concurrency
Huron	Port Austin	120.587	194.066		M-25 south / LHCT south – Port Hope, Harbor Beach	South end of M-25/LHCT concurrency
Huron	Port Austin	120.980	194.698		M-25 west / LHCT west / Spring Street – Caseville	North end of M-25/LHCT concurrency
1.000 mi = 1.609 km; 1.000 km = 0.621 mi: Concurrency terminus
