= Elk Township, Sanilac County, Michigan =

Elk Township, Michigan
- Township
- Location within the state of Michigan Elk Township, Michigan (the United States)
- Coordinates: 43°17′0″N 82°49′42″W
- Country: United States
- State: Michigan
- County: Sanilac

Area
  - Total: 35.7 sq mi (92.5 km^{2})
  - Land: 35.7 sq mi (92.5 km^{2})
  - Water: 0 sq mi (0.0 km^{2})
- Elevation: 768 ft (234 m)

Population (2020)
  - Total: 1,522
  - Density: 42/sq mi (16.4/km^{2})
- Time zone: UTC-5 (Eastern (EST))
  - Summer (DST): UTC-4 (EDT)
- ZIP codes: 48401(Applegate), 48416 (Brown City), 48453 (Marlette ), 48466 (Peck), 48471 (Sandusky)
- FIPS code: 26-25280
- GNIS feature ID: 1626225

Elk Township is a civil township of Sanilac County in the U.S. state of Michigan. The population was 1,522 at the 2020 census.

== Communities ==
- Peck is a village in the southern part of the township at the junction of M-90 and M-19. The Peck ZIP code 48466 serves most of the township.

The postal delivery areas of some other nearby communities serve the township:

- Applegate is a village to the northeast and the Applegate ZIP code 48401 serves the northeastern corner of the township.
- Brown City is a city to the southwest, and the Brown City ZIP code 48416 serves areas in the western part of the township.
- Marlette is a city to the northwest, and the Marlette ZIP code 48453 serves the northwest corner of the township.
- Sandusky is a city to the north, and the Sandusky ZIP code 48471 serves a small area in the northern part of the township.

== Geography ==
According to the United States Census Bureau, the township has a total area of 35.7 square miles (92 km^{2}), all land.

== Demographics ==
Historical population
Census	Pop.	Note	%±
2000	1,584		—
2010	1,526		−3.7%
2020	1,522		−0.3%

As of the census of 2000, there were 1,584 people, 566 households, and 435 families residing in the township. The population density was 44.4 inhabitants per square mile (17.1/km^{2}). There were 605 housing units at an average density of 16.9 per square mile (6.5/km^{2}). The racial makeup of the township was 97.29% White, 0.32% African American, 0.63% Native American, 0.19% Asian, 0.25% from other races, and 1.33% from two or more races. Hispanic or Latino of any race were 2.40% of the population.

There were 566 households, out of which 35.9% had children under the age of 18 living with them, 62.4% were married couples living together, 10.2% had a female householder with no husband present, and 23.1% were non-families. 20.3% of all households were made up of individuals, and 10.2% had someone living alone who was 65 years of age or older. The average household size was 2.74 and the average family size was 3.17.

In the township the population was spread out, with 28.2% under the age of 18, 8.1% from 18 to 24, 27.8% from 25 to 44, 21.9% from 45 to 64, and 14.0% who were 65 years of age or older. The median age was 36 years. For every 100 females, there were 101.5 males. For every 100 females age 18 and over, there were 101.2 males.

The median income for a household in the township was $38,550, and the median income for a family was $42,176. Males had a median income of $34,250 versus $20,857 for females. The per capita income for the township was $15,818. About 7.6% of families and 9.6% of the population were below the poverty line, including 11.1% of those under age 18 and 8.7% of those age 65 or over.
