= Burnside Township, Michigan =

- Civil township
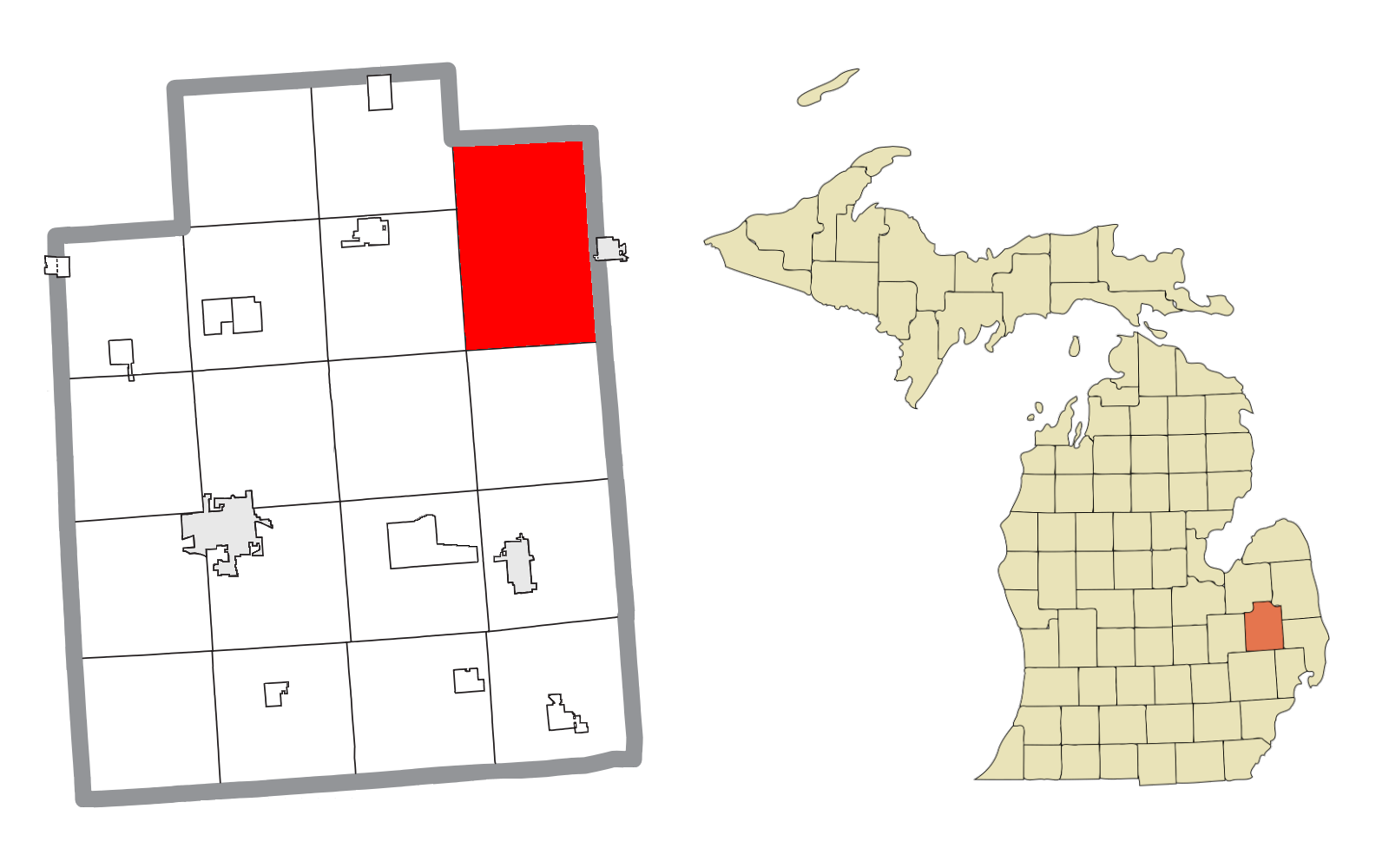
- Location within Lapeer County

- Location within the state of Michigan Location within the United States
- Coordinates: 43°13′14″N 83°03′38″W
- Country: United States
- State: Michigan
- County: Lapeer

Area
  - Total: 54.1 sq mi (140.1 km^{2})
  - Land: 54.1 sq mi (140.1 km^{2})
  - Water: 0 sq mi (0.0 km^{2})
- Elevation: 837 ft (255 m)

Population (2020)
  - Total: 1,904
  - Density: 35.20/sq mi (13.59/km^{2})
- Time zone: UTC-5 (Eastern (EST))
  - Summer (DST): UTC-4 (EDT)
- ZIP codes: 48416 (Brown City), 48444 (Imlay City), 48453 (Marlette), 48461 (North Branch)
- FIPS code: 26-11900
- GNIS feature ID: 1626006
- Website: https://www.burnsidetownship.org/

Burnside Township is a civil township of Lapeer County in the U.S. state of Michigan. The population was 1,904 at the 2020 Census.

== History ==
Burnside Township was first organized under the name of Allison Township in 1855. It was renamed to Burnside in 1866.

== Communities ==
- Burnside is an unincorporated community in the township near the junction of M-90 and M-53 at 43°12′38″N 83°04′38″W The first white settlers were William Brown in 1854 and Franklin Keeler in 1855. Allison Township was organized in 1855 and a post office named Allison was established on August 25, 1857, with Simeon P. Gates as the first postmaster. In 1866, the township and post office were renamed to honor American Civil War Union General Ambrose Burnside. The post office closed on October 30, 1913.
- The city of Brown City is to the east in Sanilac County, and the Brown City post office, with ZIP code 48416, also serves most of Burnside Township.
- The city of Marlette is to the north in Sanilac County, and the Marlette post office, with ZIP code 48453, also serves a portion of northern Burnside Township.* The village of Brown City is to the east in Sanilac County and the Brown City post office, with ZIP code 48416, also serves most of Burnside Township.
- The village of North Branch is to the west in North Branch Township, and the North Branch post office, with ZIP code 48461, also serves portions of western Burnside Township.
- The city of Imlay City is to the south, and the Imlay City post office, with ZIP code 48444, also serves a small area in southwest Burnside Township.

== Geography ==
According to the United States Census Bureau, the township has a total area of 54.1 square miles (140 km^{2}), of which 54.1 square miles (140 km^{2}) is land and 0.02% is water.

The township comprises all of survey township 9N R12E and the southern three tiers of sections of survey township 10N R12E.

== Demographics ==
As of the census of 2000, there were 1,920 people, 645 households, and 532 families residing in the township. The population density was 35.5 inhabitants per square mile (13.7/km^{2}). There were 695 housing units at an average density of 12.8 per square mile (4.9/km^{2}). The racial makeup of the township was 97.76% White, 0.05% African American, 0.42% Asian, 0.78% from other races, and 0.99% from two or more races. Hispanic or Latino of any race were 2.45% of the population.

There were 645 households, out of which 38.3% had children under the age of 18 living with them, 70.4% were married couples living together, 8.2% had a female householder with no husband present, and 17.5% were non-families. 14.0% of all households were made up of individuals, and 6.0% had someone living alone who was 65 years of age or older. The average household size was 2.98 and the average family size was 3.27.

In the township the population was spread out, with 30.7% under the age of 18, 6.8% from 18 to 24, 31.5% from 25 to 44, 22.3% from 45 to 64, and 8.8% who were 65 years of age or older. The median age was 35 years. For every 100 females, there were 105.3 males. For every 100 females age 18 and over, there were 108.0 males.

The median income for a household in the township was $43,913, and the median income for a family was $47,308. Males had a median income of $39,375 versus $21,774 for females. The per capita income for the township was $18,212. About 6.7% of families and 10.6% of the population were below the poverty line, including 12.0% of those under age 18 and 6.9% of those age 65 or over.
