= Former Kmart headquarters =

Former headquarters of American corporation

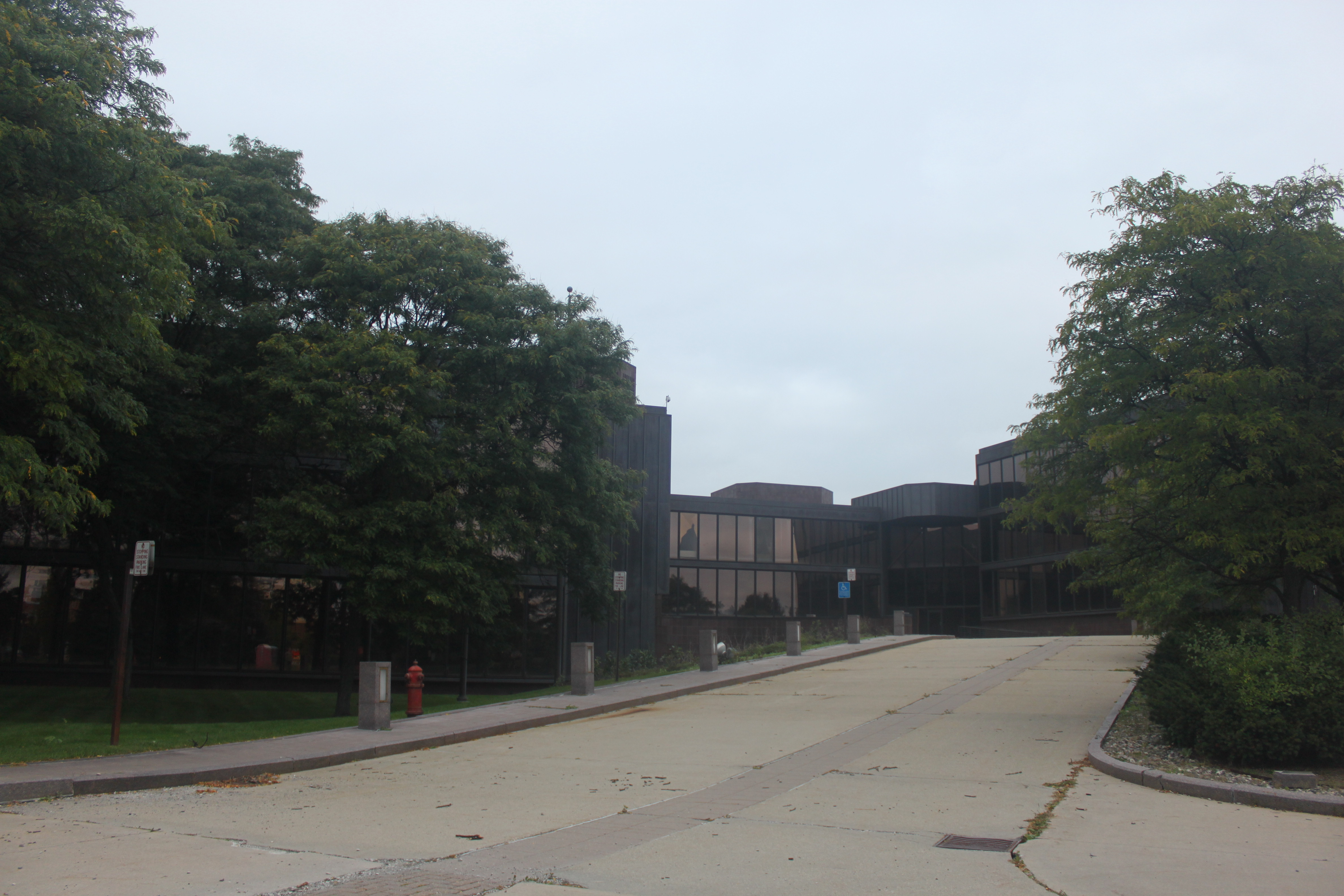
- Building in 2014
- Interactive map of the Former Kmart headquarters area

General information
- Status: Demolition in progress
- Location: Troy, Michigan
- Coordinates: 42.5626°N 83.1888°W
- Completed: 1969
- Closed: 2006
- Demolished: 2023–2024

Design and construction
- Architecture firm: Smith, Hinchman & Grylls

The former international headquarters of Kmart Corporation was located at 3100 W. Big Beaver Road in Troy, Michigan. The building, on the northwest side of the intersection of W. Big Beaver Road and Coolidge Highway, used to employ thousands of people, but had been vacant since 2006.

The building was erected in 1969, designed by Smith, Hinchman, and Grylls, Inc. In 1972, the Kresge company, the precursor of Kmart, moved its headquarters there from Detroit (where its former headquarters is now the Metropolitan Center for High Technology). In 1975 a Michigan historic marker was erected to mark the significance of the company. It was constructed for more than 5,500 headquarters staff. When Kmart purchased Sears and moved its headquarters to Chicago in 2006, the building, then housing 2,000, was vacated; art from the corporate art collection, including a tapestry by Pablo Picasso, a signed Andy Warhol poster, and exhibits from the science and technology collection including a work by Alan Bean signed by US astronauts, were sold off.

The 40-acre building was enclosed by nine towers, six smaller, two larger, and one overlooking the rest at the corner nearest the intersection of W. Big Beaver and Coolidge. The tallest tower offered a panoramic view of the surrounding area, including the adjacent Somerset Mall.

The building was sold in December 2005 to Madison Marquette, a development company that planned to use the site for a hotel, condominiums, shopping, offices, and entertainment. It was sold in 2006 for US$40 million. In 2009, The Forbes Company & Frankel Associates, owners of the mall, purchased it from Diamond Troy JV, L.L.C. for an undisclosed price. While the site had remained vacant since 2006, plans to redevelop the site had been proposed. In 2008, a redevelopment project called the Pavilions of Troy proposed to tear down the old building and create an outside shopping mall, but the project was cancelled during the Great Recession. The site had been slated for demolition by the city of Troy after sitting vacant for 15 years, with demolition ultimately starting in November 2023.

In March of 2024, University of Michigan Health, which is the branch of Michigan Medicine focusing on patient care, indicated that it is purchasing 7.28 acres of vacant land at the site to build a healthcare center providing specialty and advanced care focusing on Macomb and Oakland Counties. The purchased land is part of a 28-acre development, with construction slated to begin in 2025 and its opening anticipated in 2027.
