= Roads and freeways in metropolitan Detroit =

List of roads in part of Michigan

Roads and freeways in Metro Detroit
- Highway markers for I‑75, US 24 and M‑10

- Map of Metro Detroit freeways

System information
- Formed: 1805

Highway names
- Interstates: Interstate nn (I‑nn)
- US Highways: US Highway nn (US nn)
- State: M‑nn

System links
- Michigan State Trunkline Highway System; Interstate; US; State; Byways

The Detroit metropolitan area in southeast Michigan is served by a comprehensive network of roads and highways. Three primary Interstate Highways pass through the region, along with three auxiliary Interstates, and multiple state and U.S. Highways. These are supplemented by the Mile Road System, a series of local roads spaced one mile apart on a perpendicular grid.

Many of the grid's east-west roads are known by numbers, such as 8 Mile Road, the system's baseline and Detroit's northern border. Intersecting this grid are five diagonal spokes, major arterial roads which travel from downtown to the suburbs. Most major roads in the city and suburbs follow this grid, though streets in some areas (particularly within Detroit, and near Lake St. Clair and other lakes) deviate.

== History ==
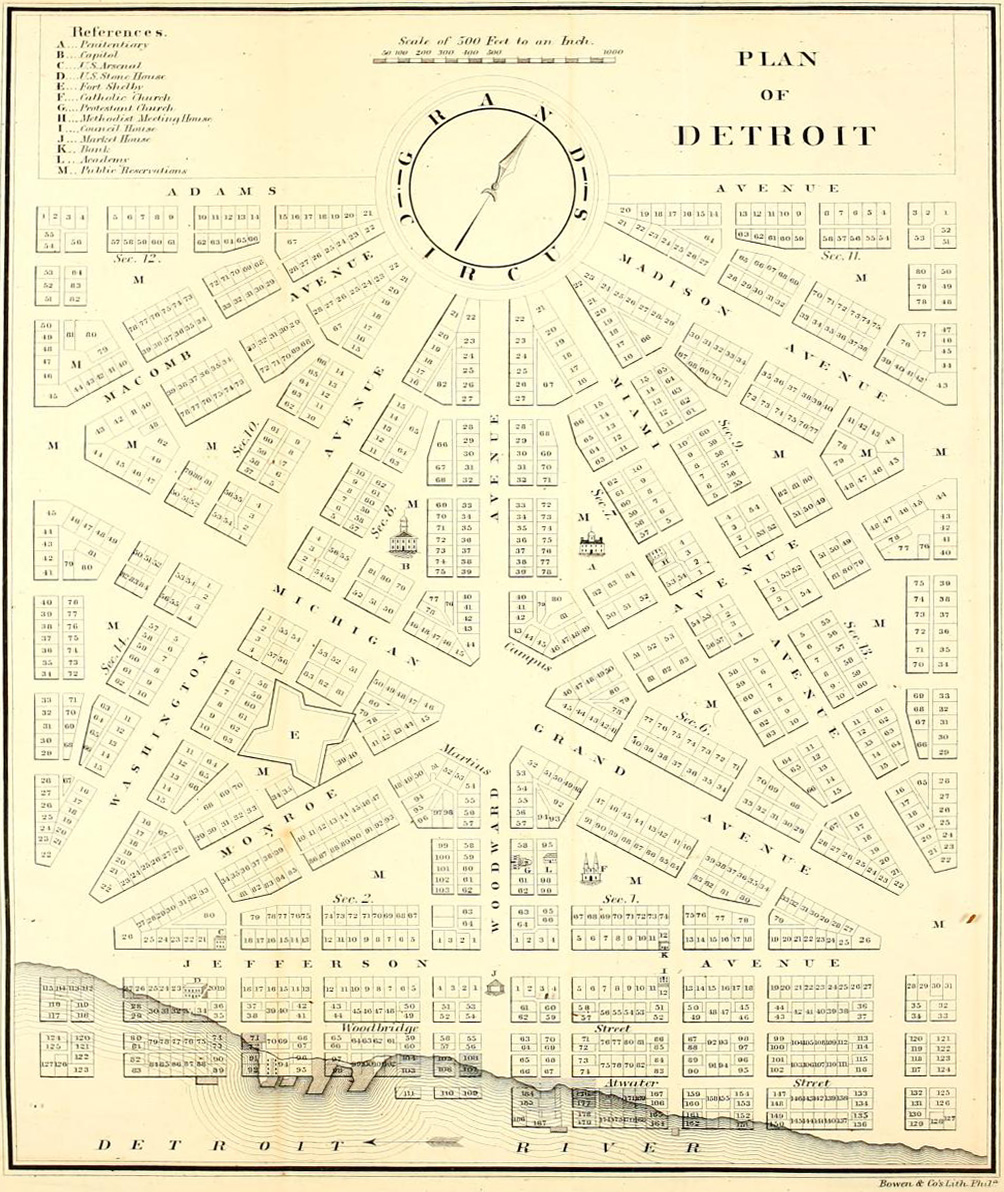
Augustus Woodward's plan following the 1805 fire for Detroit's baroque styled radial avenues and Grand Circus Park.

Following a historic fire in 1805, Judge Augustus B. Woodward devised a plan similar to Pierre Charles L'Enfant's design for Washington, D.C. Detroit's monumental avenues and traffic circles fan out in a baroque-styled radial fashion from Grand Circus Park in the heart of the city's theater district, which facilitates traffic patterns along the city's tree-lined boulevards and parks. The Woodward plan proposed a system of hexagonal street blocks, with the Grand Circus at its center. Wide avenues, alternatively 200 feet (61 m) and 120 feet (37 m), would emanate from large circular plazas like spokes from the hub of a wheel. As the city grew these would spread in all directions from the banks of the Detroit River. When Woodward presented his proposal, Detroit had fewer than 1,000 residents. Elements of the plan were implemented.

The Mile Road System extended easterly into Detroit, but is interrupted, because much of Detroit's early settlements and farms were based on early French land grants that were aligned northwest-to-southeast with frontage along the Detroit River and on later development along roads running into downtown Detroit in a star pattern, such as Woodward, Jefferson, Grand River, Gratiot, and Michigan Avenues, developed by Augustus Woodward in imitation of Washington, D.C.'s system.

The Mile Road grid came about largely as a result of the Land Ordinance of 1785, which established the basis for the Public Land Survey System in which land throughout the Northwest Territory was surveyed and divided into survey townships by reference to a baseline (east-west line) and meridian (north-south line). In Southeast Michigan, many roads would be developed parallel to the base line and the meridian, and many of the east-west roads would be incorporated into the Mile Road System.

The baseline used in the survey of Michigan lands runs along 8 Mile Road, which is approximately eight miles (13 km) directly north of the junction of Woodward Avenue and Michigan Avenue in downtown Detroit. As a result, the direct east-west portion of Michigan Avenue, and M‑153 (Ford Road) west of Wyoming Avenue, forms the zero mile baseline for this mile road system. While the roads are almost precisely aligned with cardinal directions, there are slight discrepancies—for example, the eastern terminus of 8 Mile Road in St. Clair Shores is at 42.45°N, whereas its western terminus (45 miles [72 km] away in Whitmore Lake) is 1 1/2 miles (2.4 km) south, at 42.42°N.

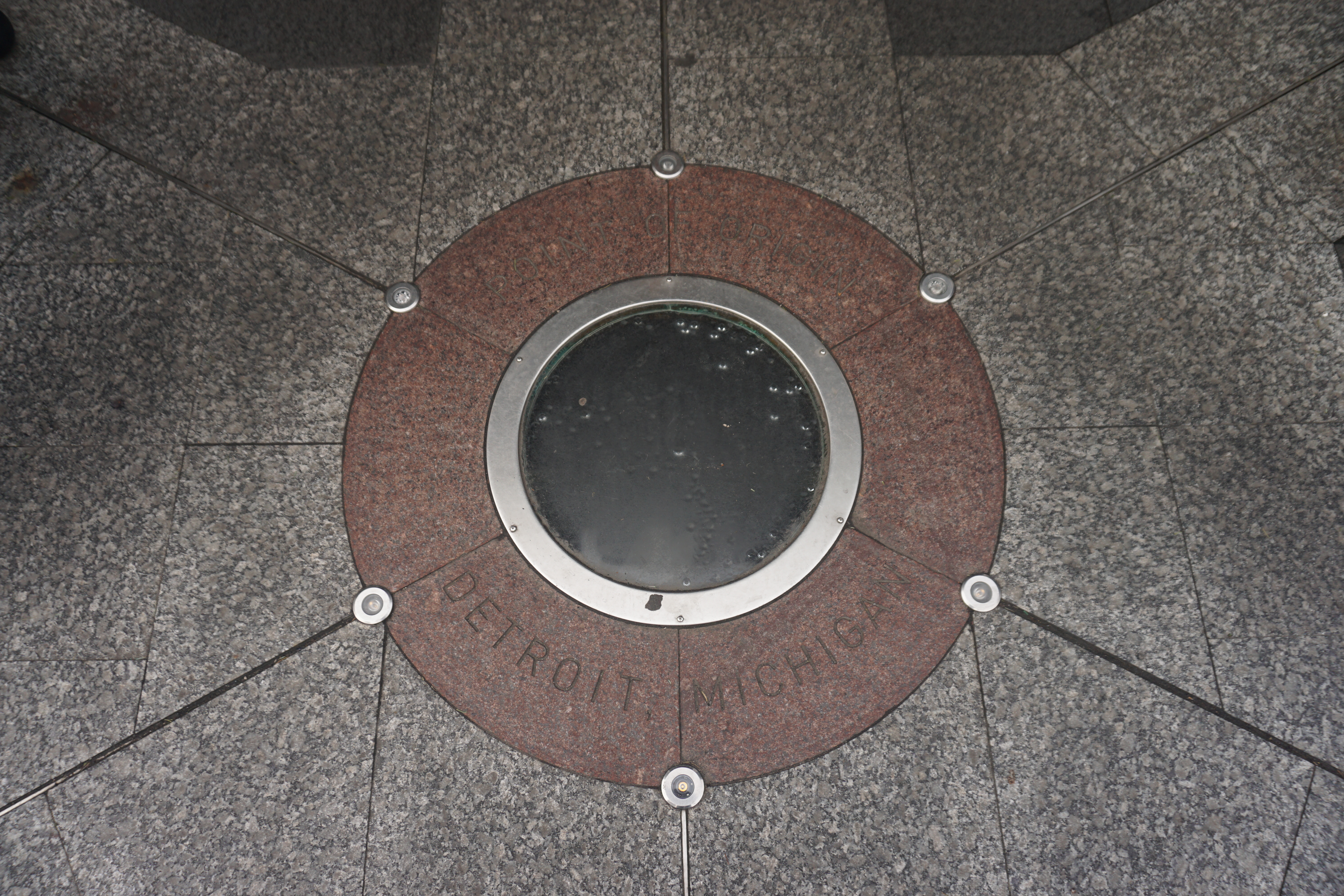
The point of origin in Campus Martius Park

The precise point of origin is located in Campus Martius Park, marked by a medallion embedded in the stone walkway. It is situated in the western point of the diamond surrounding Woodward Fountain, just in front of the Fountain Bistro.

== Freeways ==
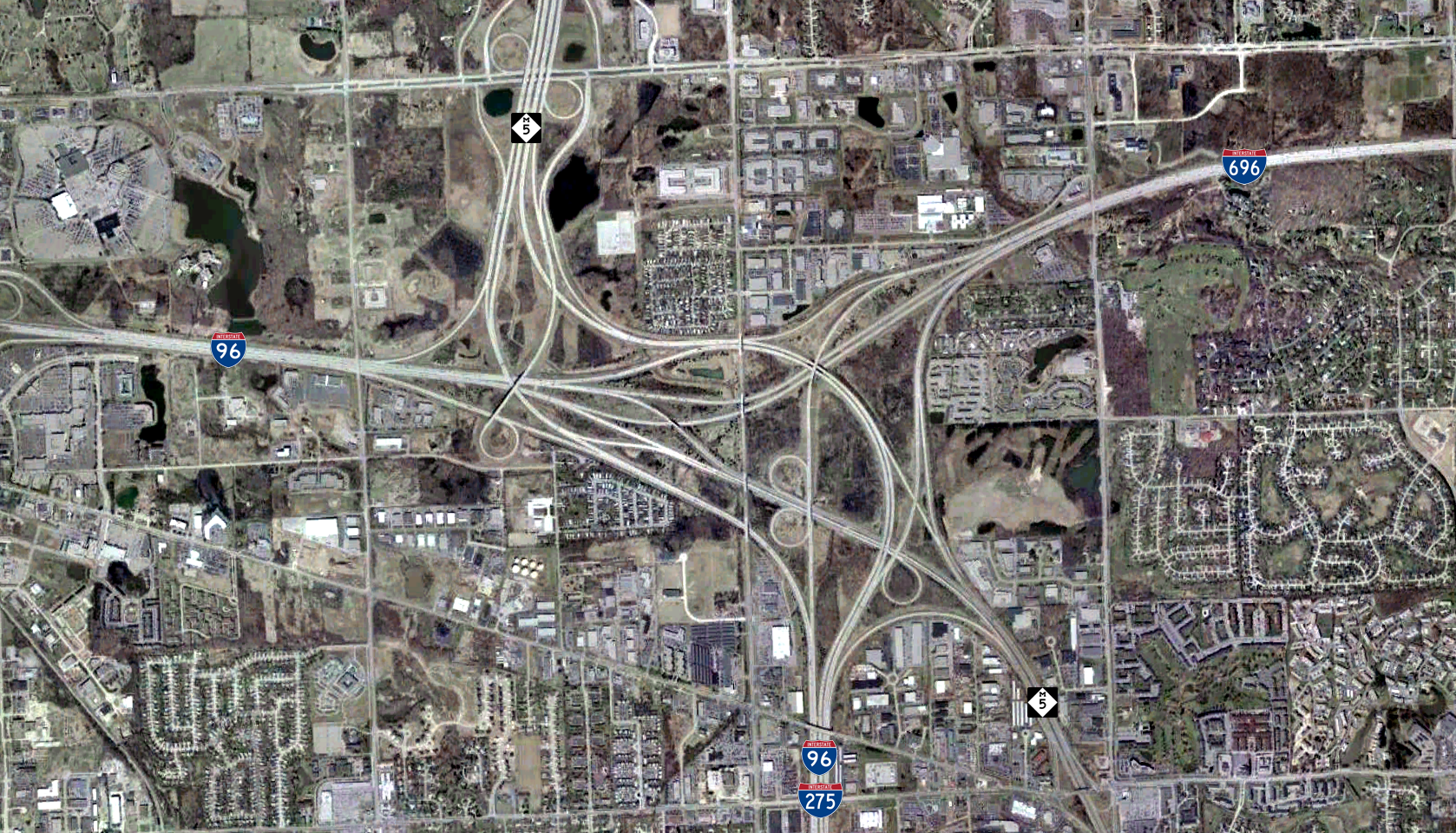
Satellite image of the I-96/I-275/I-696/M-5 interchange spanning Farmington Hills and Novi

- I-75 (Walter P. Chrysler Freeway/Fisher Freeway)—runs generally northeast-southwest through Downriver, before turning northwest in downtown Detroit, following this path through Oakland County to the north. Continues to Flint and Sault Ste. Marie north of Metro Detroit, and to Toledo to the south, eventually ending in Miami, Florida.
- I-94 (Edsel Ford Freeway/Detroit Industrial Freeway)—major east-west route. Travels east from Ann Arbor through the southwestern suburbs (passing Willow Run and Metro Airports); runs northeast-southwest across Detroit, before turning north to run through Macomb County, and northeast to its end in Port Huron. Flanked by a service drive through most of Detroit. The segment of I-94 from Ypsilanti to Detroit was one of America's earlier limited-access highways, originally built to link Dearborn with factories at Willow Run during World War II.
- I-96 (Jeffries Freeway)—begins at the Ambassador Bridge downtown; runs east-west through western Detroit and Livonia; turns north to run concurrently with I-275 along Livonia's western edge, before turning northwest again in Novi, passing through Wixom and Livingston County as it heads west toward Lansing. Known as Jeffries Freeway, and flanked by service drive, east of I-275. Segment from Outer Drive to Davison Avenue has local and express lanes, the only such setup in Michigan.
- I-275—spur of I-75; major north-south route in the western suburbs, passing Metro Airport. Runs from I-75 in Monroe County to I-96/I-696 interchange in Novi. Originally intended to travel north 23 miles (37 km) from the I‑696/I‑96/I‑275/M‑5 junction to rejoin I‑75 in Springfield Township; the northward extension was cancelled, though partially replaced by M-5 in the 1990s.
- I-375 (Walter P. Chrysler Freeway)—short 1.062-mile (1.709 km) spur of I-75 in downtown Detroit, running from I-75 to Jefferson. Among the shortest Interstate routes nationwide.
- I-696 (Walter P. Reuther Freeway)—spur of I-96; major east-west route in the suburbs immediately north of Detroit. Runs from I-96/I-275 interchange in Farmington Hills to I-94 in Roseville. Flanked by service drive from Lahser Road east. Taken together, I‑275 and I‑696 form a beltway around Detroit.
- M-5—splits from Grand River west of Middlebelt to follow a short freeway segment through Farmington and Farmington Hills to the I-96/I-275/I-696 interchange in Novi. Continues north to Pontiac Trail as a signalized expressway, constructed from 1994 to 2002.
- M-8 (Davison Freeway)—short freeway through Highland Park connecting I-75 and M-10 with Woodward. Continues as arterial road at both ends, with M-8 designation continuing west to I-96. Opened in 1942, this was the first modern depressed limited-access freeway in America.
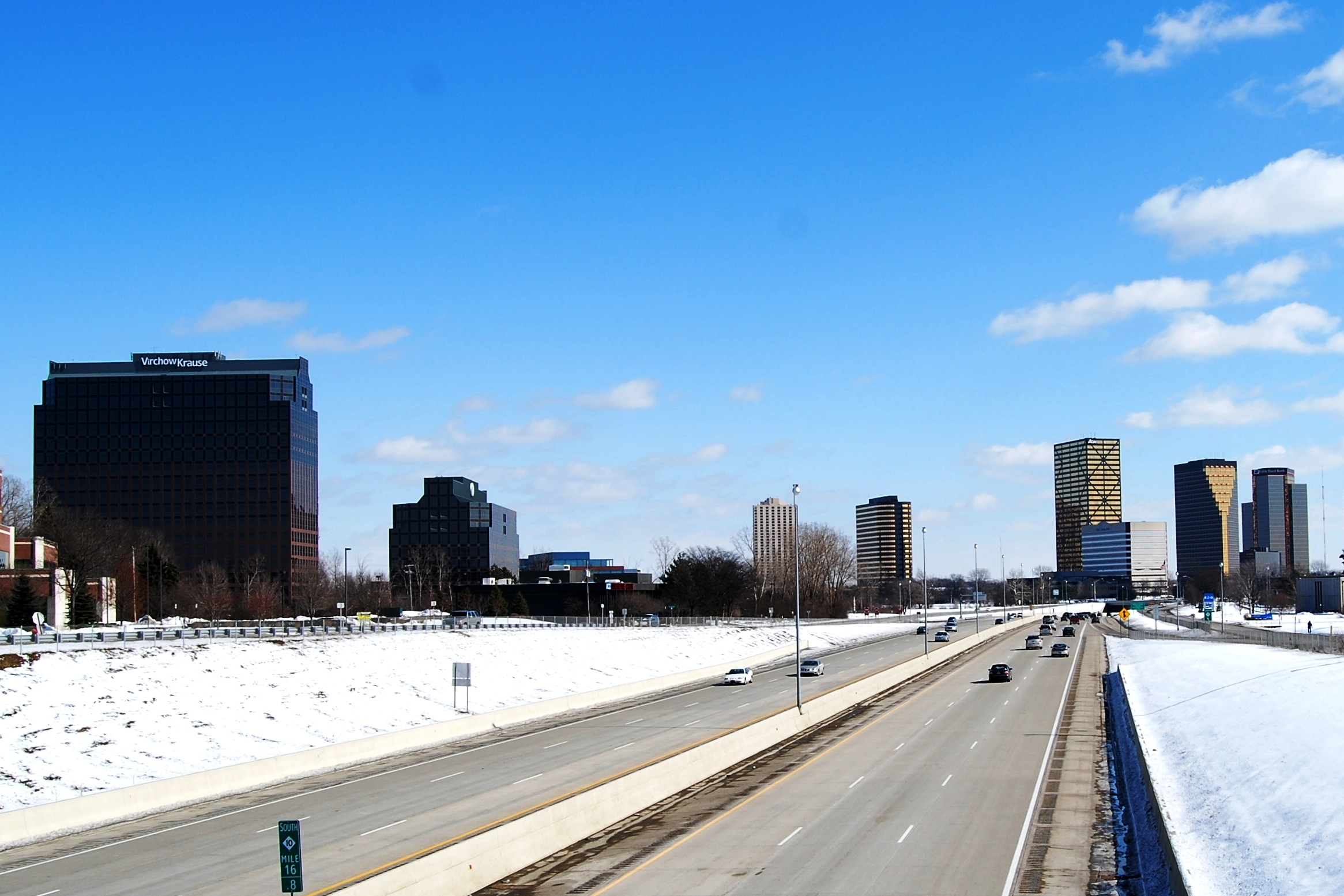
- View of southbound lanes of Northwestern Highway in Metro Detroit passing beside John C. Lodge Freeway M‑10 which is sunken below street level in front of the Southfield Town Center
  M-10 (John C. Lodge Freeway)—begins at Jefferson Avenue in downtown Detroit; runs largely parallel to I‑75 from Downtown Detroit to Wyoming Avenue, where it turns northwesterly and largely maintains this trajectory through the Mixing Bowl interchange with I-696 and US 24 in Southfield. Continues as Northwestern Highway, a surface boulevard, from I-696 west to its end at Orchard Lake Road in Farmington Hills. Flanked by a service drive for most of its freeway length.
- M-14—east-west route through western suburbs, connecting I-96 to Ann Arbor.
- M-39 (Southfield Freeway)—north-south freeway from I-94 to M-10, mostly running through Detroit's west side. Flanked by a service road for its entire freeway length. Continues as a surface arterial road, Southfield Road, at both ends, carrying the M-39 designation through Fort Street to the south.
- M-53 (Van Dyke Freeway/Christopher Columbus Freeway)—splits from Van Dyke Avenue at 18 Mile; runs as freeway, with few exits, north to Romeo.
- M-59—runs as freeway from Pontiac east to Utica, where it becomes Hall Road, a major arterial road along the 20 Mile alignment. Arterial road west of Pontiac, through Waterford and White Lake, ending at I-96 in Howell.

== Diagonal spoke arterial roads ==
Listed clockwise from southwest to northeast.

- M-85 (Fort Street)—runs southwest from Campus Martius Park through southwestern Detroit before turning due south in the suburbs. It forms a major commercial corridor in the Downriver region before ending at I-75 near Flat Rock.
- US 12 (Michigan Avenue)—begins at Campus Martius Park; runs due west along the 0 Mile alignment; turns southwest at I-94, with Ford Road following its prior path. Forms the basis for Dearborn's commercial districts, and carries on through the western suburbs and past Willow Run Airport. West of Metro Detroit, US 12 continues west through Michigan, then through Chicago and west across the United States to its end in Washington state.
- M-5 (Grand River Avenue)—runs directly northwest from downtown Detroit through the city's west side to Farmington, where it turns west, assuming the position of 10 Mile. Turns northwest again at Halsted Road, and runs through Novi toward Livingston County. Designated M-5 from Cass Avenue to just west of Middlebelt Road, where M-5 breaks from Grand River to follow a freeway. West of Detroit, Grand River continues through Brighton, Howell, and Lansing, eventually ending near Grand Rapids.
- M-1 (Woodward Avenue)—widely considered the Detroit area's main north-south thoroughfare, and designated as a National Scenic Byway and Pure Michigan Byway. Runs from downtown Detroit northwest through Midtown, New Center, and Highland Park, then through a series of small suburbs (often called the Woodward Corridor), including Ferndale, Royal Oak, Birmingham, and Bloomfield Hills, before ending at a large loop in Pontiac. Widely known as the site of the Woodward Dream Cruise, a classic car cruise held on the route every August.
- M-3 (Gratiot Avenue)—runs straight northeast from downtown Detroit through Mt. Clemens, serving as a major thoroughfare through Detroit's east side and much of urbanized Macomb County. Continues northeast through rural Macomb and St. Clair counties to its end in Port Huron.
- Jefferson Avenue (known as Biddle Avenue in Wyandotte, and Lake Shore Road in Grosse Pointe Farms and Grosse Pointe Shores)—scenic highway running along the shore of the northwesternmost end of Lake Erie, the Detroit River, and Lake St. Clair. Forms a major corridor through Downriver, much of Detroit, the Grosse Pointes, and eastern Macomb County, with an interruption at Selfridge Air National Guard Base. Feeds into M-29 at its northern end, and continues to Port Huron and points north; to the south, Jefferson becomes U.S. Turnpike Road, which, in turn, leads into Dixie Highway and continues to Monroe.
- M-97 (Groesbeck Highway) begins in Detroit at Gratiot Avenue (M-3) and ends at Hall Road (M-59).

== East-west mile roads ==
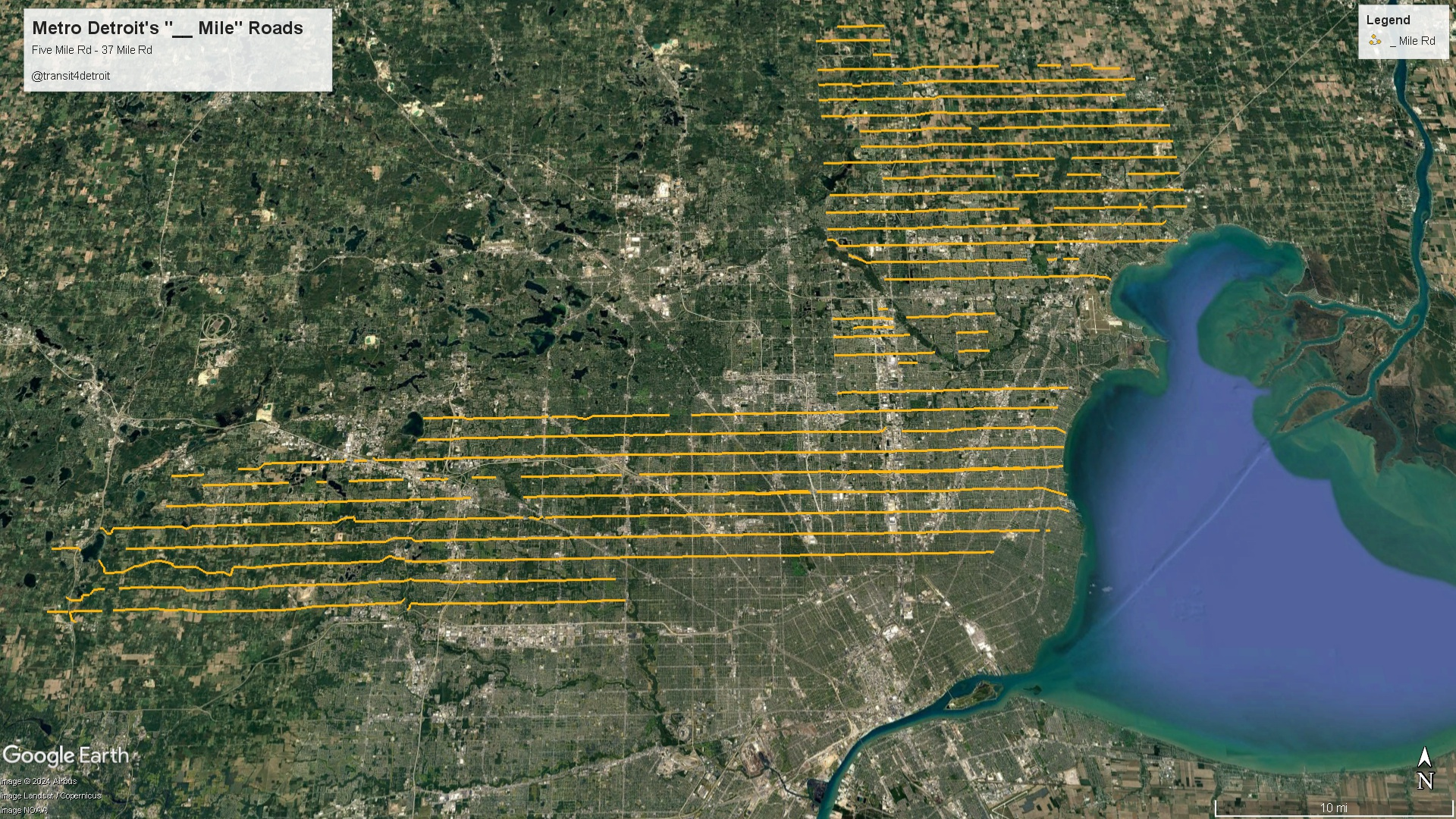
Map of Metro Detroit’s Mile Roads

=== Detroit and western suburbs ===
Listed from south to north. Mile roads south of 5 Mile are referred to exclusively by their names, not by mile numbers (e.g. Plymouth Road is never formally designated as "Three Mile").

- 0 Mile— M-153 (Ford Road)—runs from I-94 west to M-14. Forms major commercial corridor through much of western Wayne County, particularly Canton. Alignment followed by Michigan Avenue from Campus Martius to Wyoming Avenue.
- 1 Mile—Warren Avenue/Street/Road—begins at Mack Avenue in Grosse Pointe Farms; major street through much of Detroit, running parallel to Mack, roughly 3/4 mile (1.2 km) to the northwest. Turns to follow grid west of I-96, and runs west to Washtenaw County, eventually ending in Ann Arbor Township after an interruption near M-14.
- 2 Mile—Joy Road (also turns east-northeastward (at Livernois), but for a shorter distance). Whitmore Lake Road in Ann Arbor Township to Linwood Street in Detroit. Interrupted twice, first between Hines Drive and Wayne Road on the Westland/Livonia city limit and again on either side of Napier Road at the border between Wayne and Washtenaw Counties, where Plymouth-Ann Arbor Road occupies the alignment.
- Ann Arbor Road—splits from Plymouth Road near Newburgh, and continues west as roughly 2 1/2 Mile through Beck, before turning southwest.
- 3 Mile—Plymouth Road—runs from Grand River Avenue in Detroit to downtown Plymouth. Runs off-grid west of the Ann Arbor Road split in Livonia.
- 4 Mile—Schoolcraft Road—runs from Ewald Circle in Detroit west to Northville Road. Service drive for I-96 from Evergreen to Newburgh.
- 5 Mile Road (known as Fenkell Avenue in Detroit)—runs from Rosa Parks Boulevard in Detroit to just south of Whitmore Lake, with brief interruption at Northville Road and a gap between Spencer and Nollar Roads in Whitmore Lake. Forms border between Plymouth Township and Northville Township. Unpaved from Napier Road west.
- 6 Mile Road (known as McNichols Road in Detroit)—runs from Gratiot to Whitmore Lake. The section between Conner Street/Outer Drive and French Street was removed when City Airport was expanded. Unpaved sections in Washtenaw, and like 5 Mile, has a gap between Spencer and Nollar Roads.
- 7 Mile Road—runs from Kelly Road in eastern Detroit to Whitmore Lake, with brief interruption in Northville.
- 8 Mile Road— M-102 (8 Mile Road/Base Line Road)—northern border of Detroit and Wayne County; widely considered the socioeconomic dividing line between the city and its northern suburbs. Divided highway, designated M-102 from Vernier to Grand River. Runs west to Whitmore Lake. Nationally known as the namesake of the 2002 film 8 Mile.

=== Northern suburbs ===
Listed from south to north. Mile roads are referred to only by numbers in Macomb County (with few exceptions); in Oakland County, however, mile roads north of 14 Mile are referred to primarily by names, not numbers.

- 9 Mile Road—runs from Jefferson to M-36 in Whitmore Lake, interrupted only between Orchard Lake and Farmington. Serves as main east-west thoroughfare through downtown Ferndale.
- 10 Mile Road—runs from Jefferson to South Lyon. Interrupted between Farmington and M-5, with Grand River following its alignment for much of the missing length. Concurrent with I-696 service drive from Dequindre to west of Coolidge.
- 11 Mile Road—runs from Jefferson to Telegraph, serving as I-696's service drive from I-94 to Dequindre, and again from west of Greenfield to Telegraph. Serves as main east-west thoroughfare through downtown Royal Oak. Resumes west of Telegraph and runs to Farmington, then continues as a series of discontinuous segments from Drake to South Lyon.
- 12 Mile Road—runs uninterrupted from Jefferson to Beck, forming the main thoroughfare through downtown Berkley, and a major commercial corridor in Farmington Hills and Novi. Resumes as unpaved road west of Wixom Road, ultimately ending at Martindale Road.
- 13 Mile Road—runs from Jefferson to Old Novi Road, with a mile-long interruption at the General Motors Technical Center. Alignment followed by West Road in Wixom.
- 14 Mile Road—runs from Harper to Walled Lake, with brief interruption in Beverly Hills. Alignment followed by Pontiac Trail from Wixom to Milford Road.
- 15 Mile Road/Maple Road—runs from Harper to Milford Road, shifting half a mile south in Walled Lake. Forms main east-west thoroughfare through downtown Birmingham, and a major commercial corridor in Troy.
- 16 Mile Road/Metro Parkway/Big Beaver Road/Quarton Road—signalized expressway from Lake St. Clair through Macomb County; major divided highway through Troy; minor local road west of Woodward.
- 17 Mile Road/Wattles Road—runs from Schoenherr to east of Woodward. Roughly followed by Lone Pine Road west of Woodward.
- 18 Mile Road/Long Lake Road—runs from Utica Road to Orchard Lake, shifting half a mile south at Woodward.
- 19 Mile Road/Square Lake Road—runs from Romeo Plank Road to Middlebelt. Interrupted at Clinton River in Macomb County, and again briefly at Opdyke, with traffic redirected to an expressway segment of Business I-75 at the latter. Divided highway, signed as US-24 Business, from Opdyke to Telegraph.
- 20 Mile—Hall Road/Dobry Drive/South Boulevard—begins at Jefferson. Divided highway, designated M-59, from I-94 to Mound; this segment comprises the busiest commercial corridor in Macomb County. M-59 becomes a freeway at Mound, with Dobry following as service drive, before becoming South Blvd at Dequindre. Becomes Golf Drive west of Woodward, and ends at Telegraph. Rarely referred to as 20 Mile.
- 21 Mile Road/Auburn Road—runs as 21 Mile from Jefferson to Shelby Road; position assumed by Auburn at Mound. Runs west to Woodward, where it becomes Orchard Lake Road.
- 22 Mile Road/Hamlin Road/Featherstone Road—runs as 22 Mile from Card Road to Ryan Road; resumes as Hamiln at Ryan and continues west to Squirrel. Resumes as Featherstone for roughly 2 1/2 miles (4.0 km), ending at University Drive in Pontiac.
- 23 Mile Road/Avon Road—runs from New Baltimore to Oakland University. Designated M-29 west of I-94, and briefly as M-3 from I-94 to Gratiot.
- 24 Mile Road/Walton Boulevard (known as University Drive in Rochester)—runs as 24 Mile from New Baltimore to Dequindre; resumes as University Drive, becoming Walton near Livernois. Forms main east-west thoroughfare through downtown Rochester. Breaks from grid in Waterford and becomes Williams Lake Road.
- 25 Mile Road/Tienken Road—runs from Card Road to Squirrel Road. Alignment briefly followed by Walton in Waterford.
- 26 Mile Road/Mead Road/Dutton Road/Brown Road—township boundary, running from Marine City to Dequindre, and then in discontinuous segments west to Baldwin. The portion within St. Clair County is called Marine City Highway.

=== South of Ford ===
The grid continues south of Ford Road, with roads generally spaced one mile (1.6 km) apart up to, and past, the border with the state of Ohio. None of these roads connect to Detroit, and they are almost never referred to by mile numbers, officially or colloquially. Further south and west, along the Lake Erie shoreline, and through Downriver, the roads tend to fall off the grids more often, for several reasons, including remnants of the French ribbon farms and natural features preventing straight road building.

- 1 Mile—Cherry Hill Road—runs from Dearborn to Dixboro.
- 2 Mile—Palmer Road—runs from Henry Ruff to Canton Center, ends at Canton Civic Center.
- Geddes Road—South 3 Mile, Superior Township to Canton Township. Carlysle Road in Inkster and Dearborn. Liberty Road in Washtenaw County.
- 4 Mile—Van Born Road—township border road, from Van Buren Township to Allen Park, where it ends at a trumpet interchange with M‑39 and its service drives. On the north, it borders Canton, Wayne, Westland and Dearborn Heights. On the south it borders Van Buren Township, Romulus, Taylor and Allen Park. Just before Lilley Road it falls off grid. West of that point, its gridline is occupied by Yost, Mott, Clark and Scio Church Roads.
- 5 Mile—Ecorse Road—former M‑17. Once a major artery to the Willow Run Expressway. West of US 12 in Washtenaw County almost migrates a mile. In Ypsilanti, the alignment is followed by Cross Street, which continues westward to Ann Arbor as Packard Road and Eisenhower Parkway. Becomes Waters Road west of Ann Arbor-Saline Road.
- 6 Mile—Wick Road/Tyler Road—runs from Allen Park to Willow Run Airport, with brief interruption at Pelham. Becomes Tyler at west end of Romulus. Grid position followed by Ellsworth Road in Washtenaw County.
- 7 Mile—Goddard Road—Romulus to Wyandotte, falls off grid just east of I‑75. Moran Avenue takes over to River Drive while Goddard turns southeastward, running jagged to Biddle Avenue in Wyandotte. In Washtenaw County, the alignment is followed by Morgan and Pleasant Lake Roads.
- 8 Mile—Northline Road (known as Ford Avenue in Wyandotte)—runs from Biddle Avenue in Wyandotte to Detroit Metro Airport. Briefly resumes west of Metro Airport, before feeding into I-94's service drive.
- 9 Mile—Eureka Road—runs from Biddle Avenue in Wyandotte west to Huron River Drive in Romulus. Forms southern boundary of Detroit Metro Airport, and comprises a major commercial corridor in Downriver.
- 10 Mile—Pennsylvania Road—township border road. Borders Wyandotte, Southgate, Taylor and Romulus on the north side and Riverview, Brownstown Township and Huron Township to the south. Becomes Bemis Road west of the Huron River.
- 11 Mile—Sibley Road—runs from Jefferson to Huron River Drive. Resumes as Willis Road west of the Huron River.
- 12 Mile—King Road—runs from Jefferson in Trenton to Vining Road in Huron Township. Becomes Judd Road west of the Huron River.
- 13 Mile—West Road/Huron Road—runs as West from Jefferson to Huron River Drive; resumes as Huron at interchange with I-275. Becomes Dunn Road and Talladay Road west of Huron Township.
- 14 Mile—Van Horn Road
- 15 Mile—Vreeland Road—city limit road, with Woodhaven and Trenton on the north side and Flat Rock, Brownstown Township and Gibraltar on the south side. Recently extended west of Telegraph Road. Gridline also occupied west of the Huron River by Ash Road and Arkona Road.
- 16 Mile—Gibraltar Road/Will Carleton Road/Oakville Waltz Road—runs as Gibraltar west to Flat Rock, becoming Will Carleton on the other side of the Huron River. Becomes Oakville Waltz west of I-275, then shifts a quarter mile south and heads toward Milan. Forms the southern border of Wayne County from the Huron River west.

=== Eastern Detroit and Grosse Pointe ===
On Detroit's far east side, which is aligned according to the French colonial long lot system rather than the Northwest Ordinance survey grid, Cadieux, Moross, and Vernier Roads are not extensions of 6 Mile Road, 7 Mile Road and 8 Mile Road, respectively. East McNichols (6 Mile) ends at Gratiot Avenue, with traffic continuing to Cadieux two miles (3.2 km) away via Seymour Street and Morang Drive. East 7 Mile Road ends as a short four-lane one-way side street at Kelly Road, two blocks east of where Moross veers off from 7 Mile, taking most traffic with it. Most traffic on 8 Mile Road continuing east of Kelly Road veers onto Vernier Road; 8 Mile continues as a side street eastward for a short distance past Harper Avenue. This is a common misconception by residents of Detroit, Harper Woods and Grosse Pointe, as Cadieux, Moross and Vernier appear to be extensions of their mile-road neighbors, but are in fact roads in their own right.

=== Northern exurbs ===
==== Oakland County ====
- 26 1/2 Mile Road—Judah Road
- 27 Mile Road—Silverbell Road, Maybee Road, Gregory Road
- 27 1/2 Mile Road—Snell Road, Maybee Road
- 28 Mile Road—Waldon Road, Gunn Road
- 28 1/2 Mile Road—Gunn Road
- 29 Mile Road—Buell Road
- 30 Mile Road—Stoney Creek Road, Clarkston Road
- 31 Mile Road—Predmore Road, Whipple Lake Road
- 32 Mile Road—Romeo Road, Indian Lake Road, Oak Hill Road
- 33 Mile Road—Brewer Road, Drahner Road, Seymour Lake Road
- 34 Mile Road—Mack Road, Lakeville Road
- 35 Mile Road—Frick Road, Ray Road, Granger Road
- 36 Mile Road—Noble Road, Hummer Lake Road
- 37 Mile Road—Oakwood Road
- 38 Mile Road—Davison Lake Road, Sawmill Lake Road (northern border of Oakland County)

==== Macomb County ====
- 27 Mile Road—Clark Street (within New Haven)
- 28 Mile Road
- 29 Mile Road
- 30 Mile Road
- 31 Mile Road
- 32 Mile Road—St. Clair Road (within Romeo), Division Road (within Richmond)
- 33 Mile Road
- 34 Mile Road
- 35 Mile Road—Armada Center Road (Brown Road to Omo Road), School Section Road (Berman Road to Russ Road)
- 36 Mile Road—Irwin Road (Romeo Plank to east of North Avenue, then Omo Road to Regent Road)
- 37 Mile Road—McPhall Road (Coon Creek Road to Omo Road), Prinz Road (Omo Road to Cryderman Road)
- 38 Mile Road—Bordman Road (northern border of Macomb County)

==== St. Clair County ====
Through St. Clair County, none of these mile number names are carried over, as a result, all of the Mile Roads are known by their road names.

- 25 Mile Road—Arnold Road
- 26 Mile Road—Marine City Highway
- 27 Mile Road—Springborn Road
- 28 Mile Road—Meisner Road
- 29 Mile Road—Lindsey Road
- 30 Mile Road—Puttygut Road
- 31 Mile Road—St. Clair Highway
- 32 Mile Road—Division Road (Richmond to Palms Road), Fred W. Moore Highway (Palms Road eastward)
- 33 Mile Road—Clay Road
- 34 Mile Road—Woodbeck Road, Big Hand Road
- 35 Mile Road—Crawford Road
- 36 Mile Road—Meskill Road
- 37 Mile Road—Frith Road

==== Lapeer County ====
The system continues uninterrupted in sequence up to 38 Mile Road, on the Macomb–Lapeer county line near Almont and Van Dyke Road (M‑53). However, although not signed as mile roads, major roads still lie at one-mile (1.6 km) intervals in Lapeer County and in fact a few major roads that start in and around the city of Flint continue east into Lapeer County.

- 38 Mile Road—Bordman Road/Davison Lake Road
- 39 Mile Road—Hough Road
- 40 Mile Road—Almont Road, St. Clair Street, General Squier Road
- 41 Mile Road—Tubspring Road
- 42 Mile Road—Dryden Road
- 43 Mile Road—Hollow Corners Road
- 44 Mile Road—Webster Road, Ross Road, Sutton Road
- 45 Mile Road—Hunters Creek Road
- 46 Mile Road—Newark Road
- 47 Mile Road—Belle River Road
- 48 Mile Road—Attica Road
- 49 Mile Road—Davison Road (west of Lapeer, eastern continuation of a major section-line road that starts in Flint); Imlay City Road (between Lapeer and Van Dyke); Weyer Road (east of Van Dyke)
- 50 Mile Road—Oregon Road (west of Lapeer); Bowers Road (east of Lapeer)
- 51 Mile Road—McDowell Road, Davis Lake Road, Haines Road, Utley Road, Muck Road, Norman Road
- 52 Mile Road—Daley Road, Armstrong Road, Turner Road
- 53 Mile Road—Coldwater Road (eastern continuation of a major section-line road in the Flint area), portions of Marathon and Flint River Roads, Mountview Road, King Road, Lyons Road, Speaker Road
- 54 Mile Road—Stanley Road (eastern continuation of a major section-line road in the Flint area), Coulter Road, Reside Road
- 55 Mile Road—Mount Morris Road (eastern continuation of a major section-line road in the Flint area), Sawdust Corners Road, Curtis Road, Martin Road, Abbott Road
- 56 Mile Road—Pyles Road, Norway Lake Road, Clear Lake Road
- 57 Mile Road—Columbiaville Road (turns southeast as Pine Street from the east and southwest as 2nd Street from the west within Columbiaville), Mott Road, Willis Road
- 58 Mile Road—Piersonville Road, Miller Lake Road (briefly), Hasslick Road, Deanville Road
- 59 Mile Road—Sister Lake Road, Barnes Lake Road, Johnson Mill Road, Martus Road, Wilcox Road
- 60 Mile Road—Howell Road, Burnside Road (part of M-90 east of Van Dyke)
- 61 Mile Road—Otter Lake Road, Tozer Road, Elm Creek Road, Brooks Road
- 62 Mile Road—Castle Road, Stiles Road
- 63 Mile Road—Elmwood Road, Dwyer Road, Peck Road
- 64 Mile Road—Barnes Road
- 65 Mile Road—Millington Road, Montgomery Road
- 66 Mile Road—Murphy Lake Road
- 67 Mile Road—Swaffer Road, Markle Road, Soper Road
- 68 Mile Road—Brown Road, Marlette Road (northern border of Lapeer County)

== North-south grid roads ==
The area's north-south roads, often colloquially called grid roads, are similarly spaced one mile (1.6 km) apart, perpendicular to the east-west mile roads. Like the east-west grid, north-south roads lose cohesion to the grid in much of Detroit, the Grosse Pointes, eastern Downriver, and in the lake-filled areas of Oakland County.

Listed from east to west:

- Greater Mack Avenue—direct suburban continuation of Detroit's Mack Avenue. Exists in several discontinuous segments from 8 to 13 Mile.
- Harper Avenue—diagonal road through Frazho, turns north to follow grid, then turns northeast again at 13 Mile.
- Little Mack Avenue—begins at Harper just north of 9 Mile; ends at Gratiot just south of 14 Mile, resuming as residential street at 14 Mile. Widens to major road at 15 Mile, then continues for one mile to end at Metro Parkway.
- Kelly Road/Romeo Plank Road—Kelly runs diagonally from Hayes Street in Detroit through 9 Mile in Eastpointe, then turns due north to follow grid; continues through Frazho, stops, and picks up in the same position from 13 to 15 Mile. Grid position carried on by Romeo Plank from Clinton River Road to 25 Mile.
- Garfield Road—From Utica Road in Fraser to 23 Mile Road in Macomb Township. Construction of Garfield continues up to 25 Mile Road.
- Hayes Road—Although not fully contiguous, Hayes Road is a township border road through eastern Macomb County. Terminates at 28 Mile. Also continues south of 8 Mile in Detroit as Hayes Street to the large intersection of Harper, Chalmers and Hayes just near I‑94.
- Schoenherr Road—Runs from McNichols to 29 Mile. Divided highway from Metro Parkway to 20 1/2 Mile, unpaved from 26 to 29 Mile.
- Hoover Road/Dodge Park Road—carries M-97 as Hoover Street from McNichols to 8 Mile in Detroit, leads into Groesbeck at 8 Mile. North of 8 Mile, Hoover continues to Chicago Road, then is connected by Maple Lane Drive to Dodge Park's start at 15 Mile. Dodge Park continues to Utica Road; from 19 Mile north, its alignment is followed by the M-53 freeway.
- M-53 (Van Dyke Avenue)—Runs from Jefferson Avenue in Detroit to Grindstone Road in Port Austin. Although M‑53 ends at Gratiot Avenue in Detroit, Van Dyke Avenue itself actually continues to Jefferson Avenue in Detroit, adjacent to the Detroit River. At 18-Mile Road in Sterling Heights, M‑53 splits off towards the east into a freeway, and the grid road (old M‑53) continues northward as the Van Dyke Road (also signed in some places as the Earle Memorial Highway). South of 28 Mile Road, Van Dyke begins a northeast shift to a mile eastward and Camp Ground Road takes over to continue the grid.
- Mound Road—Originally planned to be at least partially a freeway, connecting the Davison Freeway with I‑696 and the M‑53 Freeway; as part of these plans, a stack interchange was built connecting it to I-696. Mound Road is the Avenue due north of the Renaissance Center. Not fully contiguous, falling off the grid as it turns into Auburn Road just north of M59. Resumes back to its grid just south of 23 Mile Road and ends at 32 Mile Road.
- Ryan Road—Runs from 23 Mile in Shelby Township through Sterling Heights, Warren and into Detroit before falling off the grid at Davison.
- Dequindre Road—runs along Oakland-Macomb county line. Not fully contiguous, falling off the grid briefly at 26 Mile before resuming just north of 28 Mile. Named for Antoine Dequindre.
- John R Street/Road—begins just south of Grand Circus Park in downtown Detroit; runs parallel to Woodward, one block northeast, from Comerica Park to McNichols, where it turns north to follow the grid. Ends at Bloomer Park in Rochester. Named for former Detroit mayor John R. Williams.
- Stephenson Highway—branches off of Rochester Road south of the Troy I‑75 Interchange and runs as a divided highway roughly 1/3 of a mile east of Campbell, before becoming the I-75 service drive just south of 12 Mile.
- Rochester Road (known as Main Street in downtown Rochester)—splits off from Main Street (Livernois) at Catalpa; runs diagonally to meet Stephenson just south of I-75. Follows grid alignment from I-75 north to Attica. Designated M-150 from M-59 north to downtown Rochester. Grid position assumed by Campbell and Hilton from 14 Mile south.
- Hilton Road/Campbell Road—runs as Hilton from 8 Mile to 10 Mile, Campbell from 10 to 14 Mile. Alignment followed by Rochester Road from I-75 north.
- Livernois Avenue/Road (known as Main Street in Royal Oak and Clawson)—begins as diagonal street at West Fort Street (M-85) in Southwest Detroit; turns north to follow grid south of Joy. Ends north of 9 Mile in Ferndale, before resuming at I-696 as Main Street, and again becoming Livernois at 14 1/2 Mile. Stops at Dutton, before short unpaved stretch in Oakland Township, ending at 26 1/2 Mile. Portion running through Detroit was once known, and dually signed, as the "Avenue of Fashion". The southernmost section of the Livernois from a railroad crossing south of West Fort Street (M-85) to Jefferson Avenue was removed in early 2020s to build the Gordie Howe International Bridge.
- Dix Road/Highway—begins at Oakwood Boulevard in Melvindale, runs just west of the Greenfield Road line through Lincoln Park and Southgate (where it becomes Dix–Toledo Highway) before turning southwestward at Northline Road (eventually ending at Telegraph Road).
- Wyoming Avenue/Street/Crooks Road—begins as diagonal street at Jefferson; known as Dearborn Street, then Industrial Street, and finally Ferney Street, before becoming Wyoming. Turns north to follow grid at Ford Road. Becomes Rosewood Street at 8 1/2 Mile; ends at I-696, and briefly resumes as residential street under the name Wyoming. Crooks splits off from Main Street (Livernois) at Catalpa, running northwest before turning north to follow Wyoming's grid position at 13 Mile. Continues north to end at Avon; briefly resumes as Old Perch Road from Avon to Walton. Easternmost north-south grid road to reach Ford Road on the same north-south alignment. 2nd Street in Wyandotte almost follows this grid a few feet to the west.
- Meyers Road—aligned on a half-mile line, Meyers runs from Capital Street (in Royal Oak Township) to just north of Tireman Street (1 1/2 Mile). From Tireman south to Michigan Avenue, Miller Road follows this gridline and then shifts to a south-southeasterly route to its terminus at Fort Street); and from just north of Capital Avenue to its terminus at 11 Mile Road, Scotia Road follows this gridline.
- Schaefer/Coolidge Highway—begins as diagonal road at Jefferson; briefly known as Coolidge before becoming Schaefer at River Rouge-Detroit border. Turns north to follow grid at I-94. Becomes Coolidge again at 8 Mile, and runs north to end at South Boulevard, with an interruption at 14 Mile. Portions known as Monnier Road prior to Detroit's annexation of Greenfield Township.
- Greenfield Road/Adams Road—begins as diagonal road at Schaefer; turns north to follow grid at Michigan Avenue, and runs north to end at 14 Mile. Resumes as Adams at Woodward (at roughly 14 1/2 Mile), continues north in place until 21 1/2 Mile, where it shifts a mile to the east, assuming the grid position of Coolidge. Ends at Stoney Creek Road near Lake Orion. Grid position assumed in the Downriver area by Burns Street in Lincoln Park and Southgate, Fort Street in Riverview and Trenton and Division Street in Trenton.
- Squirrel Road—unusual for not following exactly the mile grid lines, Squirrel runs north from Wattles Road (17 Mile) along a north-south line displaced 1/4 mile east from the line of Southfield Road. Squirrel then drifts further east before ending at Silverbell Road (27 Mile Road).
- Southfield Freeway/Southfield Road—begins at Jefferson as undivided local road; becomes M-39 and widens to divided highway at Fort Street. Runs as limited-access expressway, with service drive, from I-94 to M-10, assuming grid position at Michigan Avenue. M-39 designation ends at M-10, though Southfield continues as an undivided arterial road, ending at Maple just west of downtown Birmingham. Grid position assumed by McCann Road/Avenue/Street in Southgate and Brownstown.
- Allen Road/Pelham Road/Evergreen Road/Opdyke Road—begins as Allen at Fort Street. Allen turns northeast at Goddard (eventually ending at Greenfield), with Pelham following its grid position through Rotunda Drive. Resumes as Evergreen at Michigan Avenue, and continues north to end at Quarton. Briefly known as Cranbrook Road from 14 Mile to Maple, and as Covington Road from Maple to Quarton. Resumes as Opdyke at Woodward just north of Long Lake; runs north to end at Lapeer Road just south of I-75.
- Lahser Road—runs from West Outer Drive (just south of Fenkell) to Square Lake. Often mispronounced or misspelled "Lasher" (including on an early I-696 sign); correct pronunciation is debated, usually either "LAH-ser" or "LAH-zer", though sometimes "LAH-sher". Center road for the original Redford Township, now largely part of Detroit. Grid position assumed by Monroe Street in Dearborn, and Racho Road in Taylor and Brownstown.
- US 24 (Telegraph Road)—divided highway for most of its length, with short expressway portions. Follows the grid alignment from Brownstown Township to Southfield, where it strays slightly off the gridlines. Forms much of the western boundary of Detroit, and a major commercial corridor through Taylor, Southfield, and Bloomfield Township. It has gained notoriety in a song ("Telegraph Road") by the group Dire Straits.
- Beech Daly Road/Franklin Road—runs as Beech Daly (sometimes hyphenated) from Sibley to 8 Mile, with short gap in Inkster. Renamed simply Beech Road at 8 Mile; ends at 10 Mile just south of Holy Sepulchre Cemetery. Position roughly assumed by Franklin from Northwestern to Long Lake; shifts about 3/4 mile to the east at Long Lake and continues to Woodward.
- Inkster Road—runs straight north from Huron River Drive to Lone Pine, with interruption at 14 Mile. Township border road for its entire length; separates several communities, including Farmington Hills and Southfield in Oakland County, and Redford Township, Livonia, Dearborn Heights, Westland, Taylor and Romulus in Wayne County.
- Middlebelt Road (sometimes signed "Middle Belt")—runs straight north, uninterrupted, from Huron River Drive to Walnut Lake, then turns northeast to end at Orchard Lake. Forms eastern boundary of Detroit Metropolitan Airport.
- Merriman Road/Orchard Lake Road—begins as unpaved road from Huron River Drive to Eureka; begins again, paved, at north entrance to Detroit Metropolitan Airport. Runs north from DTW, becoming Orchard Lake at 8 Mile, and briefly stopping and restarting at Grand River. Turns northeast at Pontiac Trail and continues to downtown Pontiac, becoming Auburn Road at Woodward.
- Farmington Road—residential street through Westland and Garden City; major road from Ann Arbor Trail north to Walnut Lake. Stops in downtown Farmington and resumes 1/4 mile to the east before returning to the grid at 10 Mile. Roughly follows center line of Oakland County. Grid position assumed by Vining Road from Ecorse Road south, and by Crescent Lake Road in Waterford.
- Wayne Road/Drake Road—begins as Wayne at Detroit Metro Airport, and runs north to Plymouth Road. Resumes as Drake at 9 Mile, and continues north to end at Walnut Lake.
- Newburgh Road/Halsted Road—Runs from Michigan Avenue to Pontiac Trail; becomes Halsted at 8 Mile before brief interruption at M-5. Unpaved from 14 Mile to Walnut Lake. Often misspelled "Halstead".
- Haggerty Road—Begins near Huron River Drive and runs due north through Canton; progressively shifts a mile west from Warren Road to 5 1/2 Mile, with an interruption at Plymouth Road. Follows township boundary for most of its remaining length, from 5 1/2 Mile north to its end at Richardson Road. Runs alongside I-275 from Van Buren Township to Farmington Hills. Grid position assumed by Williams Lake Road to the north, and Hannan Road to the south.
- Meadowbrook Road/Welch Road—Separated between 13 and 14 Mile. Haggerty follows this alignment in Canton.
- Lilley Road—aligned on a half-mile line, Lilley forms much of the eastern border of the city of Plymouth, where it is also known as Mill Street. Becomes Northville Road at Wilcox, and runs north to end in downtown Northville.
- Morton Taylor Road/Novi Road (known as Main Street in Plymouth)—begins at I-94 and runs north to Van Born. Resumes at Saltz, becomes Main Street at Joy, and runs north to downtown Plymouth, where it turns east and becomes Plymouth Road. Resumes as Novi Road at 8 Mile; continues north to 13 Mile, where it shifts half a mile to the east. Becomes Decker Road at 14 Mile, and continues to its end at Commerce Road. Alignment followed by Martinsville Road south of I-94.
- Sheldon Road—Like Lilley, Sheldon Road is on a half-mile alignment, and it is a county road from 8 Mile Road in Northville to Van Born Road at the Canton/Van Buren Township border. Sheldon forms much of the western boundary of the city of Plymouth, and is one of only two exits off of M‑14 that services Plymouth. Known as Center Street between 7 Mile and 9 Mile where the road ends.
- Belleville Road/Canton Center Road—Forms center line of Van Buren and Canton Townships. Begins as Belleville Road in downtown Belleville; becomes Canton Center at Michigan Avenue. Ends at Joy, with most traffic diverted northeast to Sheldon via Sheldon Center Road connector. Grid position followed by Taft Road in Northville and Novi.
- Beck Road—from Tyler Road in Van Buren Township to Potter Road in Wixom.
- Ridge Road—a largely rural route, Ridge veers off to the west significantly south of Ford Road, crossing the Wayne-Washtenaw county line and into the easternmost part of Ypsilanti. At Saltz Road, Denton Road splits from Ridge and resumes the line from Cherry Hill Road to Ecorse Road. Garfield and Wixom Roads follow this line in Oakland County.
- Napier Road—from Cherry Hill to Grand River. Napier forms part of the border between Wayne and Washtenaw Counties for the most part, though it does veer off to the west for a few miles. From I‑94 to Oakville-Waltz Road, Rawsonville Road follows the same alignment.
- Chubb Road—from 5 to 10 Mile Roads, paved from 5 to 6 Mile and a short section just south of 10 Mile. Gotfredson Road follows the same alignment from Brookville Road to Geddes Road, paved between North Territorial Road and Plymouth-Ann Arbor Road.
- Currie Road—from 5 to 10 Mile Roads, paved from 6 to 10 Mile.
- Milford Road—Milford Road starts at 10 Mile and runs north and northeast shortly after the intersection of Huron River Pkwy to General Motors Road near Downtown Milford and continues through Highland Township and turns into Holly road in the city of Holly. Curtis Road, which runs from 6 Mile to Plymouth-Ann Arbor Road, runs roughly along the same line, as does Prospect Road from south of Murray Lake (after winding eastward from Plymouth-Ann Arbor Road) to Grove Street just north of I-94.
- Griswold Road/Tower Road—Tower Road is gravel. Griswold runs from 8 to 10 Mile in Lyon Township and South Lyon.
- Pontiac Trail—Through some twists and turns Pontiac Trail ends in the northeast at Orchard Lake Road at the village of Orchard Lake and takes a meandering southwesterly route to New Hudson in Lyon Township to avoid the nearby shopping center and Interstate 96. This results in Pontiac Trail ending at Milford Road north of I‑96 and then continuing at a three-road intersection of Grand River, Milford and Pontiac Trail south of I‑96. Later turning south at the intersection of Silver Lake Road it goes south and through Downtown South Lyon as Lafayette Street and goes southwest to Ann Arbor and ends at Swift Street one block north of Plymouth Road in Ann Arbor.
- Dixboro Road—Oakland and Livingston County line, also runs southward into Ann Arbor and Ypsilanti.
- Carpenter Road—Washtenaw County, former US 23 from M-17 in southwest Ann Arbor to Main Street in Milan. Signed as Dexter Street in Milan. Another portion of Old US 23 in Monroe County follows the alignment from Cone Road (US 23 exit 22) into Dundee. Earhart Road north of Geddes Road follows the same alignment, veering eastward between Goss Road and M-14, staggering eastward at Joy Road, and again at 6 Mile where it drifts further eastward off the grid.
- Sutton Road—from Pontiac Trail to 6 Mile Road, paved from Pontiac Trail to North Territorial Road. Platt Road follows the alignment from Washtenaw Avenue in Ann Arbor to Day Road near Dundee.
- Spencer Road/Marshall Road—Spencer Road runs from North Territorial to 8 Mile with a bearing to the east around 6 Mile. Marshall follows the same alignment with Spencer Road from 8 Mile to Silver Lake Road.

== Address numbering scheme ==
Addresses are generally numbered outwards from Woodward Avenue (south of McNichols Road) and John R Street (north of McNichols) for numbers on east-west roads and from the Detroit River (east of the Ambassador Bridge), a Norfolk Southern Railway/CSX Transportation railroad line between the Ambassador Bridge and the Rouge River, the Rouge River itself north to just past Evergreen Road in Dearborn, an invisible line from there to the eastern end of Cherry Hill Road and Cherry Hill Road for numbers on north-south streets, with the numbers increasing the further one is from these baselines.

Addresses in the Detroit area tend to be much higher than in many other major cities, with numbers in the 20000s common within the city limits and in the inner-ring suburbs. The highest addresses used in the Detroit system are the range 79000 to 80999, for north-south roads beyond 37 Mile Road in northern Macomb County, and from 81000 to the high 81900s in the portion of the city of Memphis that bulges about 0.5 miles (0.80 km) into St. Clair County. For many years, the Guinness Book of World Records incorrectly listed 81951 Main Street (M‑19) in Memphis as the highest street address number anywhere, but higher numbers are in use elsewhere in the United States. The Detroit system also extends as far west as Lyon Charter Township, whose supervisor's offices are located at 58000 Grand River Avenue, and as far south as the southernmost border of Wayne County.

With a few exceptions, one can determine which mile roads an address is between on major north-south roads north of Five Mile/Fenkell by using the formula:

[(first two numbers of the address)-5] / 2

Example: 34879 Gratiot Avenue [(34-5)/2]= 14.5 which indicates the address is between 14 Mile and 15 Mile roads.

In the early days of Detroit-area house numbering, surveyors calculated position on the grid of mile roads to define addresses. The resulting system, adopted in 1921 and sometimes referred to as the Detroit Edison system, generally assigns 2000 addresses to each mile. (There are often gaps in the numbering; for instance, east addresses 9000 to 10999 and north addresses 2300 to 5599 [at Ford Road] are skipped). Typically, addresses of single family homes on adjacent lots on the grid system, both within Detroit and in the suburbs, are incremented by 8, 10, 12 or more rather than by 2 as is the case in most other large cities in the United States.

=== Pontiac grid ===
Pontiac and a number of surrounding communities have a separate grid, on which numbers ascend traveling away from the corner of Saginaw and Pike streets in downtown Pontiac. This system is used in Pontiac, Auburn Hills, Bloomfield Township, Bloomfield Hills, Waterford, Sylvan Lake, Keego Harbor, Orchard Lake Village, West Bloomfield, and portions of White Lake. Addresses on Woodward in these communities use the Detroit scheme.

=== Other independent numbering schemes ===
Though many suburbs also use the Detroit system, there are several that border those using the Detroit system that instead use their own numbering systems.

- Mount Clemens: numbers ascend on north–south roads traveling away from Cass Avenue on roads that intersect it, and using separate numbering ranges on all other roads.
- Romeo: numbers ascend on north–south roads traveling away from 32 Mile, and on east–west roads traveling away from Main Street.
- Rochester and Rochester Hills: numbers ascend on north–south roads traveling away from Walton Boulevard, and on east–west roads traveling away from Main Street/Rochester Road.
- Clawson and Troy: numbers ascend on north–south roads traveling away from 14 Mile, and on east–west roads traveling away from Main Street/Livernois Road.
- Birmingham: numbers ascend on north–south roads traveling away from Maple Road, and on east–west roads traveling away from Old Woodward Avenue. Addresses on Woodward use the Detroit scheme.
- Berkley: numbers ascend on north–south roads traveling north from 11 Mile, and on east–west roads traveling west from Woodward. Addresses on Woodward use the Detroit scheme.
- Royal Oak: numbers ascend by 100 every block (roughly 350 feet [110 m]) on north–south roads traveling away from 11 Mile, and on east–west roads traveling away from Main Street. Addresses on Woodward use the Detroit scheme.
- Pleasant Ridge: numbers ascend on north–south roads traveling south from I-696, and on east–west roads traveling away from Woodward. Addresses on Woodward use the Detroit scheme.
- Ferndale: numbers ascend on north–south roads traveling north from 8 Mile, and on east–west roads traveling away from Woodward. Addresses on Woodward use the Detroit scheme.
- Northville: numbers ascend on north–south roads traveling away from Main Street, and on east–west roads traveling away from Center Street.
- Plymouth: numbers ascend on north–south roads traveling away from the alignment of Church and Union streets, and on east–west roads traveling away from Lilley Road/Mill Street.
- Belleville: numbers ascend traveling away from the intersection of Main, South, Columbia, and Huron River Drive.
- Grosse Pointe Farms and Grosse Pointe Shores: numbers ascend on northeast-southwest roads traveling away from Fisher Road, and on northwest-southeast roads traveling away from Lake St. Clair.
- River Rouge: numbers ascend on north–south roads traveling south from the Rouge River, and on east–west roads traveling away from Jefferson. Addresses on Jefferson use the Detroit scheme.
- Ecorse and Lincoln Park: numbers ascend on north–south roads traveling south from the cities' northern borders, and on east–west roads traveling away from Jefferson. The two cities use the same scheme for east–west roads, but different numbers for north–south roads. Addresses on Outer Drive in these communities use the Detroit scheme.
- Wyandotte: numbers ascend on north–south roads traveling south from the Ecorse River, and on east–west roads traveling west from the Detroit River.
- Trenton: numbers ascend on north–south roads traveling south from Sibley Road, and on east–west roads traveling west from the Detroit River.

== See also ==
- Michigan left
- Roads and expressways in Chicago
