= M-90 (Michigan highway) =

State highway in Lapeer and Sanilac counties in Michigan, United States

M-90
- M-90 highlighted in red

Route information
- Maintained by MDOT
- Length: 44.178 mi (71.098 km)
- Existed: c. 1927–present

Major junctions
- West end: M-24 near North Branch
- M-53 near Burnside; M-19 near Peck
- East end: M-25 at Lexington

Location
- Country: United States
- State: Michigan
- Counties: Lapeer, Sanilac

Highway system
- Michigan State Trunkline Highway System; Interstate; US; State; Byways
← M-89	→ M-91

M-90 is a state trunkline highway in The Thumb region of the US state of Michigan. It runs from near North Branch eastward to Lexington situated on Lake Huron. The highway is a lightly traveled roadway that runs through rural farmlands. The trunkline runs mostly east–west with two short north–south segments where it turns to run concurrently with other state highways. Along the routing, there are two river crossings and one railroad crossing.

The current highway that bears the M-90 designation is the second to carry number. The first is now a section of M-69 in the Upper Peninsula. A section of current highway gained the number by 1927. Extensions of the highway further east resulted in the current routing by 1934.

== Route description ==
M-90 starts at an intersection with M-24 in Deerfield Township in northern Lapeer County. The intersection is near the Lapeer State Game Area. After a short jog northeast to cross the Flint River, it runs due east on North Branch Road through rural farmland. The highway passed through North Branch on its way to M-53 in Burnside Township. There it turns south and runs concurrently with M-53 on Van Dyke Road for about 1.5 miles (2.4 km) before turning east on Burnside Road. M-90 continues east to pass through Brown City near the Sanilac County line. In Brown City, M-90 follows Main Street and crosses a branch of the Huron and Eastern Railway before it becomes Burns Line Road. South of Peck, M-90 turns north along M-19 on Brockway Road. M-90 once again turns east as a solo route on the east side of Peck and follows Peck Road. The trunkline crosses the Black River on the south side of Croswell before ending at M-25 near Lake Huron in Lexington.

None of the highway is listed on the National Highway System, a system of roads that are important to the nation's economy, defense and mobility. The traffic levels, as measured in terms of average annual daily traffic, a calculation of the average number of vehicles along a section of roadway for any given day, vary between 1,132 vehicles west of M-53 and 7,029 vehicles in Croswell. The Michigan Department of Transportation (MDOT) also computed the number of commercial vehicles in the 2009 survey and found that the highway was used by 120–163 commercial trucks each day on average.

== History ==
=== Previous designation ===
The first designation of M-90 was in the Upper Peninsula by July 1, 1919. This highway started at M-45 (now M-95 south of Sagola and ran east to Foster City. It was replaced by M-69 by late 1927.

=== Current designation ===
M-90 in the Lower Peninsula replaced the M-38 designation between M-36 near North Branch and M-19 near Melvin. In 1930, when M-24 was extended north, M-90 was extended west to intersect the new highway north of Lapeer. The eastern end was extended in 1934 to US Highway 25 in Lexington. The final gravel segment of the highway was paved in 1957 in Sanilac County.

== Major intersections ==
County	Location	mi	km	Destinations	Notes
Lapeer	Deerfield Township	0.000	0.000	M-24 – Lapeer, Caro	
Lapeer	Burnside Township	12.056	19.402	M-53 north – Bad Axe	Northern end of M-53 concurrency
Lapeer	Burnside Township	13.542	21.794	M-53 south – Imlay City	Southern end of M-53 concurrency
Sanilac	Speaker Township	27.330	43.983	M-19 south – Yale	Southern end of M-19 concurrency
Sanilac	Peck	30.219	48.633	M-19 north – Sandusky	Northern end of M-19 concurrency
Sanilac	Lexington	44.178	71.098	M-25 / LHCT – Port Huron, Port Sanilac	
1.000 mi = 1.609 km; 1.000 km = 0.621 mi: Concurrency terminus
