= Metropolitan Parkway (Detroit area) =

Major thoroughfare in Metro Detroit

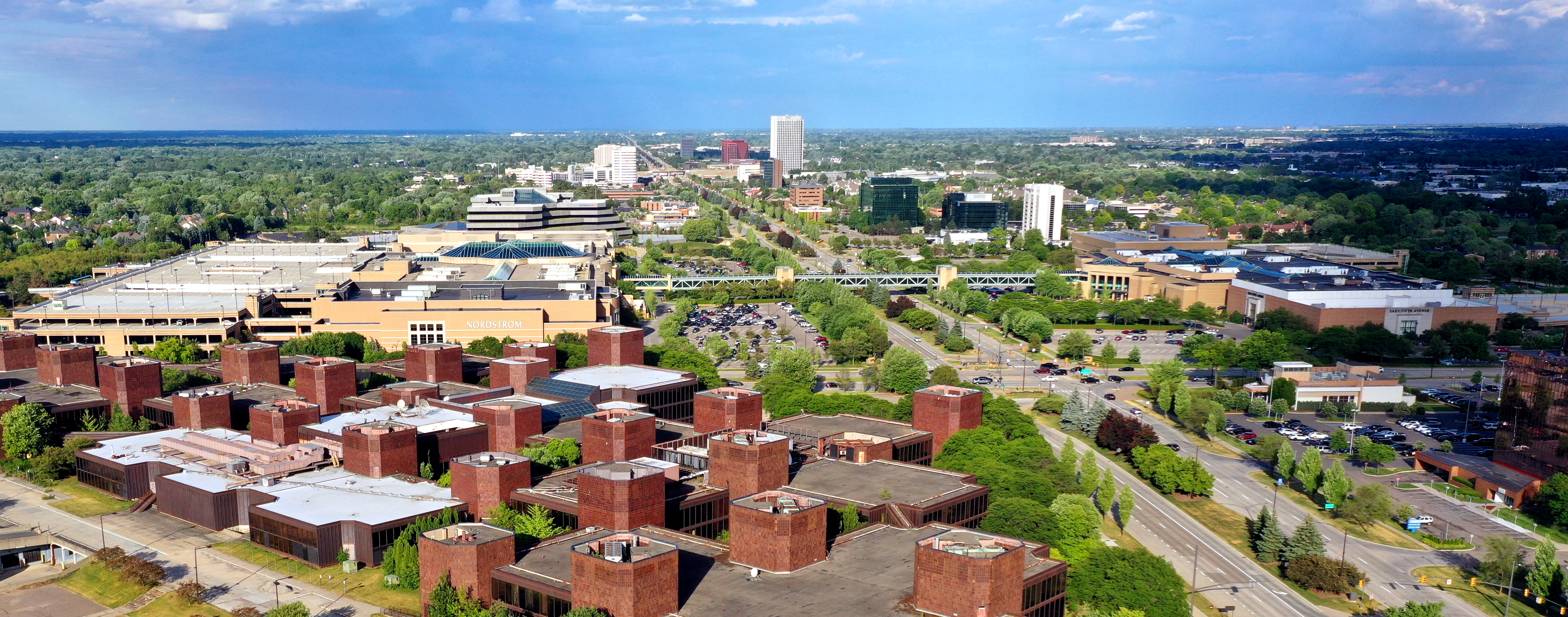
- Big Beaver Road, looking Eastbound, in Troy, Michigan
- Length: 25.23 mi (40.60 km)
- West end: US 24 in Bloomfield Township
- Major junctions: M-1 in Bloomfield Township I-75 in Troy; M-53 in Sterling Heights; M-97 in Clinton Township; M-3 in Clinton Township I-94 in Harrison Township
- East end: Lake St. Clair Metropark in Harrison Township

Metropolitan Parkway or Metro Parkway is a major thoroughfare in Metro Detroit that stretches west from Lake St. Clair Metropark to Bloomfield Township. Metro Parkway corresponds to 16 Mile Road in Metro Detroit's mile road system, and is sometimes referred to as such by area residents, but it is rarely officially called 16 Mile. It is only called Metro Parkway in Macomb County, and is known as Big Beaver Road and Quarton Road in Oakland County.

== Route description ==
At its start, Metro Parkway is a four-lane divided expressway with signalized intersections at major roads, but very limited access from side streets. The east end of Metro Parkway is in Harrison Township at the main entrance to Lake St. Clair Metropark, at an intersection with Jefferson Avenue. Two miles to the west, Metro Parkway meets Interstate 94 at a partial cloverleaf interchange, and then crosses the Clinton River and enters Clinton Township. There, Metro Parkway widens to six lanes, and is joined by a frontage road, Nunneley Road, on either side, before an intersection with Gratiot Avenue. It crosses the Clinton River again as it enters Sterling Heights.

After crossing the river, Metro Parkway passes the Freedom Hill County Park. It becomes a more standard divided highway at the Schoenherr Road intersection, with business and side streets along the corridor. After it crosses Van Dyke Avenue, Metro Parkway passes Chrysler's Sterling Heights Assembly plant, before a short overpass carries the road over a railroad track. A frontage road runs at-grade alongside the overpass, providing access to the Chrysler plant and other businesses between Van Dyke and Mound Road. The road then passes the Detroit Free Press/Detroit News printing plant, and continues west as Metro Parkway for another two miles.

Upon crossing Dequindre Road, the Macomb-Oakland County border, Metro Parkway enters Troy and its name changes to Big Beaver Road. Big Beaver initially runs through a residential area, but the corridor progressively becomes more commercialized as it approaches I-75, with strip malls on either side at the Rochester Road intersection. High-rise office buildings, including the PNC Center, dominate the landscape by the time Big Beaver crosses Livernois Road. The three-mile segment of Big Beaver between Rochester Road and Coolidge Highway forms Troy's central business district, and is one of the busiest corridors in Oakland County.

Half a mile west of Livernois, Big Beaver meets Interstate 75. The junction with I-75 was previously a cloverleaf interchange, but it was reconstructed in 2020 as a diverging diamond interchange. Big Beaver then continues west past more hotels and office buildings, including the headquarters of Kelly Services. The two buildings of the high-end Somerset Collection shopping mall, connected by an enclosed pedestrian bridge, flank Big Beaver on either side as it approaches Coolidge Highway.

West of Coolidge, Big Beaver passes the long-abandoned former Kmart headquarters and a few more office buildings before narrowing to a five-lane undivided road. As it crosses Adams Road, Big Beaver enters Bloomfield Township, and crosses Woodward Avenue a mile to the west. Immediately west of the Woodward intersection, the road narrows to two lanes, and its name changes again to Quarton Road. Quarton continues west for another three miles along the southern border of Bloomfield Hills, before ending at US-24 (Telegraph Road).

Quarton continues as a local road at another intersection a quarter mile north on Telegraph. This segment of Quarton runs two miles west before ending at Inkster Road. West of Inkster, Quarton's path is followed by Walnut Lake Road in West Bloomfield, and eventually by Buno Road in Milford Township.

== Big Beaver Corridor Study ==
In 2006, the Big Beaver Corridor Study was announced, with the goal of making Big Beaver into a world-class boulevard, creating a downtown for Troy, which while having office parks conspicuously lacks a city center. The goals of the study were to create a more positive impression of Troy among visitors, and to increase pedestrian accessibility of local businesses.

In 2008, the Big Beaver Corridor Study was incorporated into a new city master plan. One result of the plan was a change in zoning, allowing for businesses to be located close to the street and for restaurants to be free-standing, rather than part of a strip mall or enclosed mall. As a result, the Big Beaver Corridor through Troy has become a regional "restaurant hub" with many high-end independent and chain restaurants.
