= Lake St. Clair Metropark =

Park in Michigan, United States

- Metro Beach
- Location within Michigan Location within the United States
- Type: Regional park
- Location: Lower Peninsula, Macomb County, Michigan USA
- Coordinates: 42.57569°N 82.7993°W
- Area: 770 acres (310 ha)
- Created: 1950
- Operator: Huron–Clinton Metroparks
- Status: Open year round
- Website: Official site

Lake St. Clair Metropark/Metro Beach Metropark is a 770-acre (310 ha) unit of the Huron-Clinton Metroparks system located roughly 20 miles (32 km) northeast of downtown Detroit, in Harrison Township, Macomb County. Lake St. Clair Metropark has been in existence since 1950 and has seen many changes since then. Originally named St. Clair Metropolitan Beach, it was renamed in 1953 to Metropolitan Beach Metropark and later shortened to Metro Beach Metropark. On December 8, 2011, the Board of Commissioners for the Huron-Clinton Metroparks approved changing the name to Lake St. Clair Metropark. The park is located at Jefferson Avenue and Metropolitan Parkway (16 Mile Road) and there are signs to Lake St. Clair Metropark on Interstate 94 (I-94).

Due to sewage overflows, Metro Beach has seen occasional closures caused by high E. coli content in the water. The beach was closed for nine days in 2009 for this reason.

== Activities ==
View at the peninsula of the southeast corner of the park

The main attractions at Lake St. Clair Metropark are the 1,000-foot (300 m)-long Metro Beach, which still retains its former name, on Lake St. Clair, the marinas and boat launches, an Olympic-sized pool with two water slides and inflatable obstacle course, the "Squirt Zone" where kids can play with equipment that shoots water, an 18-hole Par 3 golf course and miniature golf course, the fitness trails, and the Nature Study Area/Nature Center where 275 species of birds have been recorded. A paved, one mile shoreline trail follows the Lake St. Clair shoreline in the park.

Ice-fishing, cross-country skiing on groomed trails, and ice skating are some of the winter activities Metro Beach has to offer.

== Upgrades ==
In July 2026, Huron-Clinton Metroparks announced a $15 million campaign to take place over a three-year period. Work will include reopening the North Marina which closed in 2019 due to damage caused by high water. The North Marina Bathhouse will be upgraded as will the West Boardwalk and electrical infrastructure and adding greenery to Parking Lot C which will aid in storm run-off.

== Miscellaneous trivia ==
- The point that extends into Lake St. Clair was originally an island.
- On a clear day, the Nine Mile Tower in St. Clair Shores and the Renaissance Center in Detroit are visible over Lake St. Clair.
- Despite being in a suburban area, there are deer that live within Lake St. Clair Metropark like many other areas in Metro Detroit.
- Detroit radio station, WCSX, recorded a parody of the song Kokomo in the late 1990s making fun of the notorious filthiness of the lake of the time.
