= Peck, Michigan =

- Village
- Location of Peck, Michigan
- Coordinates: 43°15′30″N 82°48′59″W
- Country: United States
- State: Michigan
- County: Sanilac

Area
  - Total: 1.04 sq mi (2.69 km^{2})
  - Land: 1.04 sq mi (2.69 km^{2})
  - Water: 0 sq mi (0.00 km^{2})
- Elevation: 790 ft (240 m)

Population (2020)
  - Total: 593
  - Density: 570.0/sq mi (220.06/km^{2})
- Time zone: UTC-5 (Eastern (EST))
  - Summer (DST): UTC-4 (EDT)
- ZIP code: 48466
- Area code: 810
- FIPS code: 26-63260
- GNIS feature ID: 0634544
- Website: https://www.villageofpeck.com/

Peck is a village in Sanilac County of the U.S. state of Michigan. As of the 2020 census, Peck had a population of 593. The village is in Elk Township.

== Geography ==
According to the United States Census Bureau, the village has a total area of 1.05 square miles (2.72 km^{2}), all land.

== Demographics ==
Historical population
Census	Pop.	Note	%±
1910	274		—
1920	341		24.5%
1930	372		9.1%
1940	381		2.4%
1950	471		23.6%
1960	548		16.3%
1970	580		5.8%
1980	606		4.5%
1990	558		−7.9%
2000	599		7.3%
2010	632		5.5%
2020	593		−6.2%
U.S. Decennial Census

=== 2010 census ===
As of the census of 2010, there were 632 people, 246 households, and 151 families living in the village. The population density was 601.9 inhabitants per square mile (232.4/km^{2}). There were 283 housing units at an average density of 269.5 per square mile (104.1/km^{2}). The racial makeup of the village was 95.1% White, 0.6% African American, 2.2% Native American, 0.2% Asian, 0.5% from other races, and 1.4% from two or more races. Hispanic or Latino of any race were 4.9% of the population.

There were 246 households, of which 33.3% had children under the age of 18 living with them, 46.3% were married couples living together, 12.2% had a female householder with no husband present, 2.8% had a male householder with no wife present, and 38.6% were non-families. 29.7% of all households were made up of individuals, and 13% had someone living alone who was 65 years of age or older. The average household size was 2.54 and the average family size was 3.23.

The median age in the village was 37.1 years. 25.9% of residents were under the age of 18; 11.1% were between the ages of 18 and 24; 24.2% were from 25 to 44; 24.5% were from 45 to 64; and 14.2% were 65 years of age or older. The gender makeup of the village was 47.8% male and 52.2% female.

=== 2000 census ===
As of the census of 2000, there were 599 people, 239 households, and 162 families living in the village. The population density was 593.0 inhabitants per square mile (229.0/km^{2}). There were 253 housing units at an average density of 250.4 per square mile (96.7/km^{2}). The racial makeup of the village was 96.83% White, 0.67% Native American, 0.33% Asian, and 2.17% from two or more races. Hispanic or Latino of any race were 1.17% of the population.

There were 239 households, out of which 32.6% had children under the age of 18 living with them, 51.9% were married couples living together, 12.1% had a female householder with no husband present, and 32.2% were non-families. 28.9% of all households were made up of individuals, and 13.0% had someone living alone who was 65 years of age or older. The average household size was 2.46 and the average family size was 3.04.

In the village, the population was spread out, with 27.4% under the age of 18, 9.3% from 18 to 24, 27.4% from 25 to 44, 20.5% from 45 to 64, and 15.4% who were 65 years of age or older. The median age was 34 years. For every 100 females, there were 92.6 males. For every 100 females age 18 and over, there were 91.6 males.

The median income for a household in the village was $29,063, and the median income for a family was $36,023. Males had a median income of $30,000 versus $20,804 for females. The per capita income for the village was $14,622. About 10.3% of families and 12.5% of the population were below the poverty line, including 15.0% of those under age 18 and 9.2% of those age 65 or over.
