= Somerset Collection =

Luxury shopping mall in Michigan, U.S.

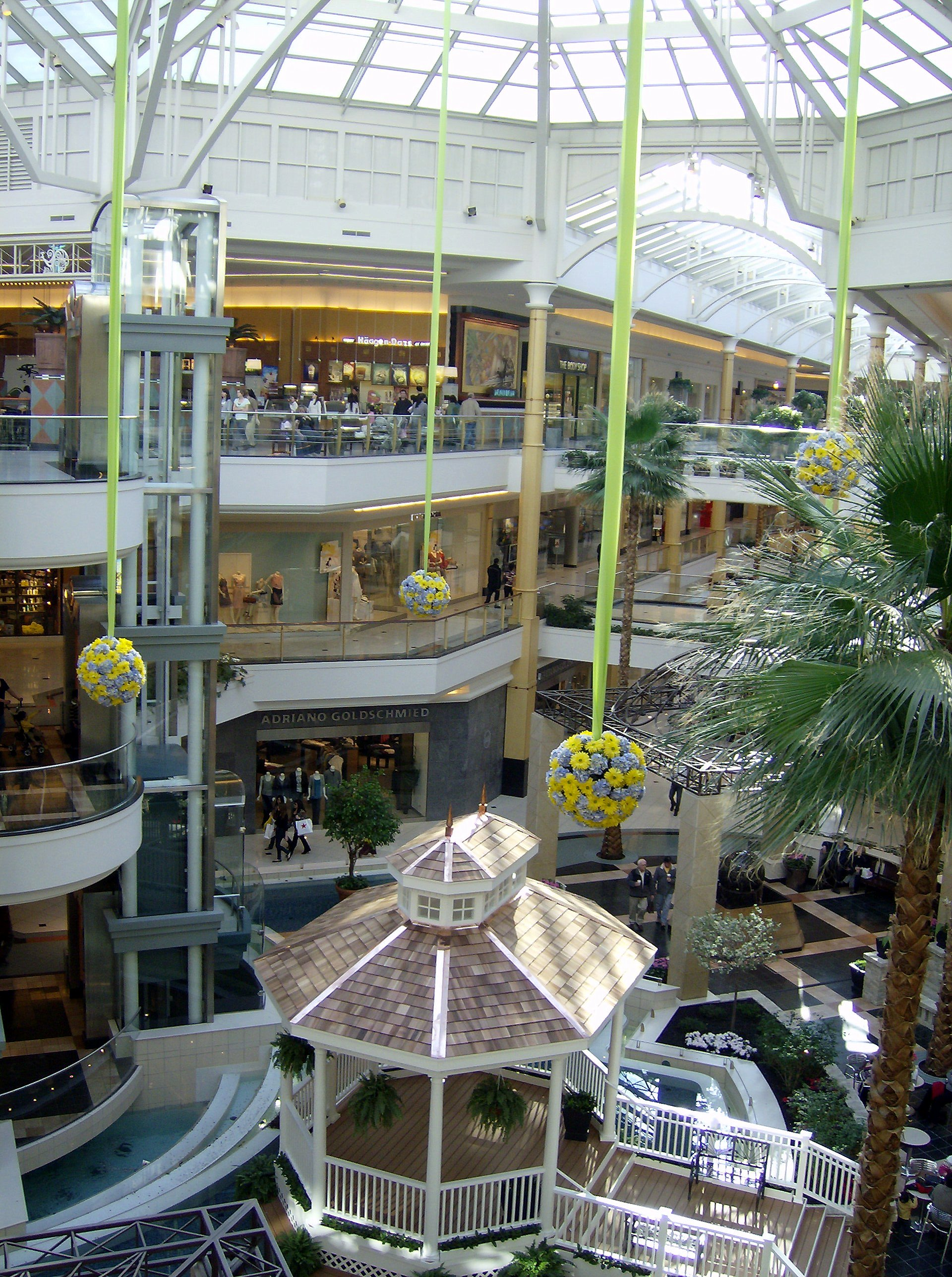
- The Grand Court at Somerset North incorporates a full glass dome
- Location: Troy, Michigan
- Coordinates: 42°33′41″N 83°11′2″W
- Address: 2800 W. Big Beaver
- Opened: 1969 (Somerset Mall); 1992 (Somerset South); 1996 (Somerset North)
- Developer: Forbes/Cohen
- Manager: The Forbes Company
- Owner: The Forbes Company & Frankel Associates
- Architect: JPRA Architects; Peterhansrea Designs
- Num. of stores: 160
- Num. of anchor tenants: 4
- Floor area: 1,450,000 sq ft (134,700 m^{2})
- Floors: 2 (Somerset South); 3 (Somerset North and all anchors)
- Parking: 7,000 spaces Surface parking, covered parking, and valet.
- Public transit: SMART 460, 461, 780
- Website: thesomersetcollection.com

Somerset Collection is a shopping mall of more than 180 retailers located in Troy, Michigan, United States, in Metro Detroit. Somerset Collection is developed, managed, and co-owned by The Forbes Company, and is among the most profitable malls in the United States not owned by a real estate investment trust. (Of the 100 most profitable American malls, 76 are owned by real estate investment trusts.) The mall hosts the traditional mall retail anchor tenants Macy's, Nordstrom, Saks Fifth Avenue, and Neiman Marcus, along with specialty retailers like Lululemon, Nike, and Arhaus, and luxury brands including Dior, Saint Laurent, Versace, and Hermès.

== History ==
Somerset Collection includes many relaxing water displays throughout the mall.

On April 14, 1967, Saks Fifth Avenue opened a 70,000 sq ft (6,500 m^{2}) stand-alone store on Big Beaver Road in Troy, an affluent suburb 20 miles northwest of downtown Detroit. A one-floor upscale "Somerset Mall" designed by Louis G. Redstone Associates, was built onto the existing Saks, with a new Bonwit Teller store as the other anchor. Thirty five additional stores opened, including I. Miller, Abercrombie & Fitch, Mark Cross, and FAO Schwarz.

Bonwit Teller markedly renovated its store in 1988, only to close in 1990 after the chain went bankrupt. In 1991–1992 the center was renamed Somerset Collection, a second level was added, and Neiman Marcus opened a 141,000-sq. ft. store on the site of the razed Bonwit Teller. A 21,000-sq. ft. Barneys, 13,000-sq. ft. Crate & Barrel and luxury stores like Tiffany also opened over the course of 1992.

Following the popularity of the revamped mall, co-owners Forbes/Cohen Properties and Frankel Associates opened a new three-story $30,000,000, 940,000 sq ft expansion across from Somerset Mall on August 11, 1996, designed by JPRA Architects.

Michigan's first Nordstrom and a Hudson's (became Marshall Field's in 2001 and finally Macy's in 2006) anchored the three-story expansion, named Somerset North. When Marshall Field's transitioned to Macy's in 2006, Somerset became one of only three malls in the country to host all four department stores.

Connecting Somerset North and Somerset South is a 700 feet (210 m) enclosed bridge known as the "Skywalk" over Big Beaver Road. The enclosed, climate-controlled skybridge was one of the first of its kind in the country, featuring moving walks to move shoppers between Somerset Collection South and Somerset Collection North.

Two years after Somerset North opened, Somerset South was renovated. In late 1998, Saks expanded by 40,000 sq ft and added a parking structure. Crate & Barrel added an additional floor dedicated to sales of furniture, as did Banana Republic.

In 2004, Somerset South was further renovated. The mall features lighting by Paul Gregory (Focus Lighting), a continuous skylight, glass elevators, and fountains designed by WET. The Somerset Collection includes several notable sculptures, including a Finnish Sorvikivi Floating Stone fountain. Mall at Millenia, in Orlando, Florida, also designed by JPRA Architects, was based on Somerset Collection and is similar in design. Neither mall has kiosks.

In December 2009, the Forbes Company acquired an adjacent site on which an open-air mixed-use development known as the Pavilions of Troy was proposed. Although plans were approved, the project did not move forward, and no further plans were announced.

In 2012, calling it “strategic capital investments”, Saks renovated its store after it identified the Somerset location as having “high growth potential”.

In 2016, Chick-fil-A opened a location in the Peacock Cafe food court, the first location in Metro Detroit that was not at the food court of a college campus or airport.

In 2017, Zara opened its first store in Michigan on the first and second floors of the Macy's wing.

By 2023, since the government lockdown, Somerset Collection has added several newest additions, among them are Prada, Vuori, Gucci Men's Store, Moncler, Balenciaga, Breitling, Fabletics, Hermès, Diptyque, and Dior.

== Shops and restaurants ==
The Somerset Collection contains 1,450,000 sq ft (134,700 m^{2}) of gross leasable area with over 180 stores. The four department store anchors are: Nordstrom (240,000 sq ft (0.022 km^{2})) and Macy's (300,000 sq ft (0.028 km^{2})) in Somerset North, and Neiman Marcus (141,000 sq ft (0.0131 km^{2})) and Saks Fifth Avenue (160,000 sq ft (0.015 km^{2})) in Somerset South.

The third level of the Somerset Collection North features a food court called Peacock Cafe, featuring 10 restaurants and seating for 650 customers.

== Special events ==
Special events are hosted at Somerset Collection year-round. The layout includes stages for the performing arts. The special events include yoga classes, special savings, Santa visits during the Christmas season, fashion shows, and other events sponsored by the Collection and individual stores.

In 2011, the Forbes Company debuted a group of pop-up mini-shops called Somerset Collection CityLoft in Downtown Detroit, specifically at the Lower Woodward Avenue Historic District, which had been a major Detroit shopping district. Various stores from Somerset have opened pop-up shops on Merchant's Row in the 1200 to 1400 block of Woodward Avenue, generally open the last Thursday to Saturday of the month from June through August, and occasionally September. In 2012 this concept was extended to the Christmas season, with CityLoft Holiday "Yappy" Hour.

== Gallery ==
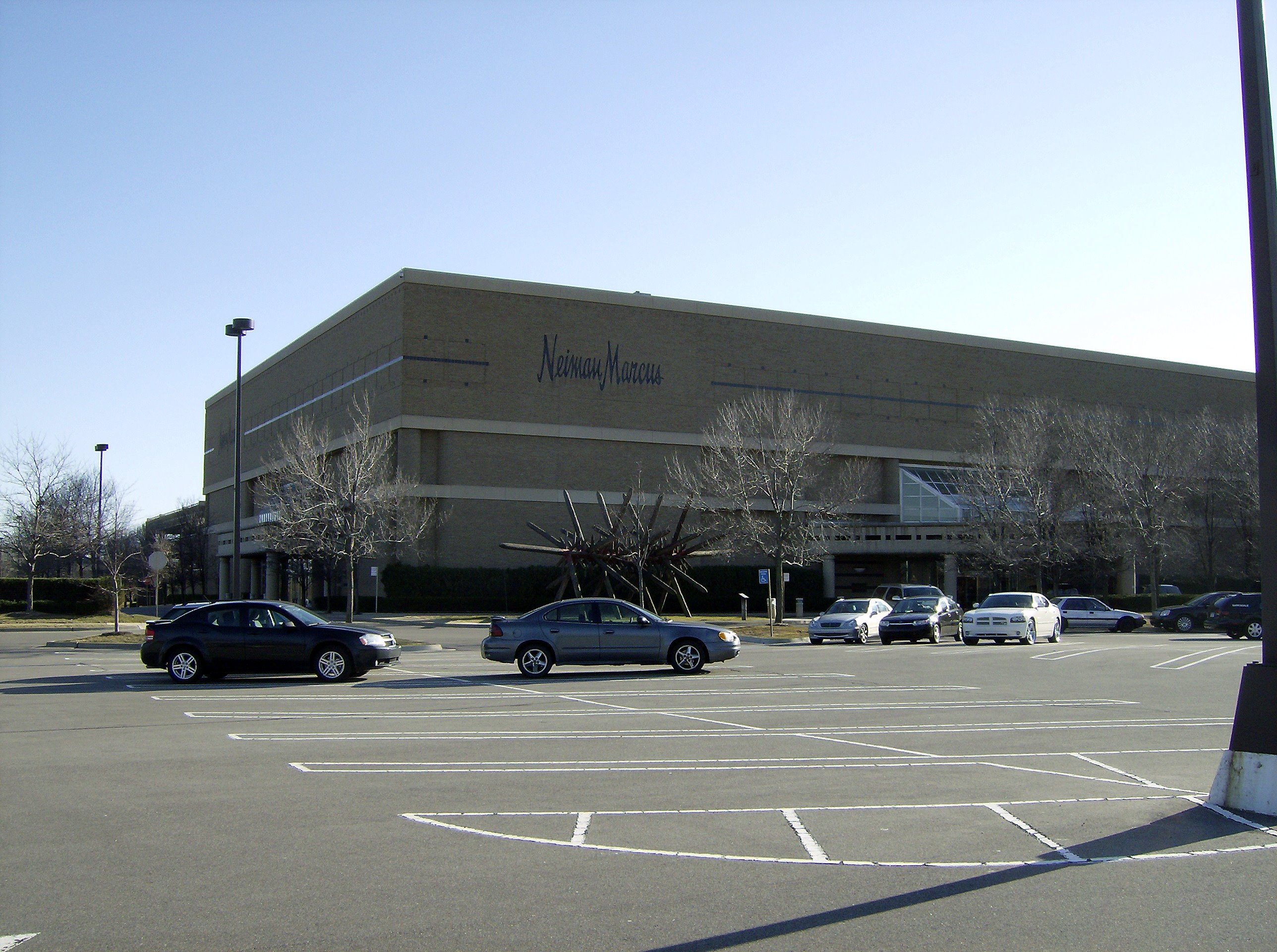
Somerset South at Neiman Marcus

Somerset Collection North sign

Sculpture at Somerset South

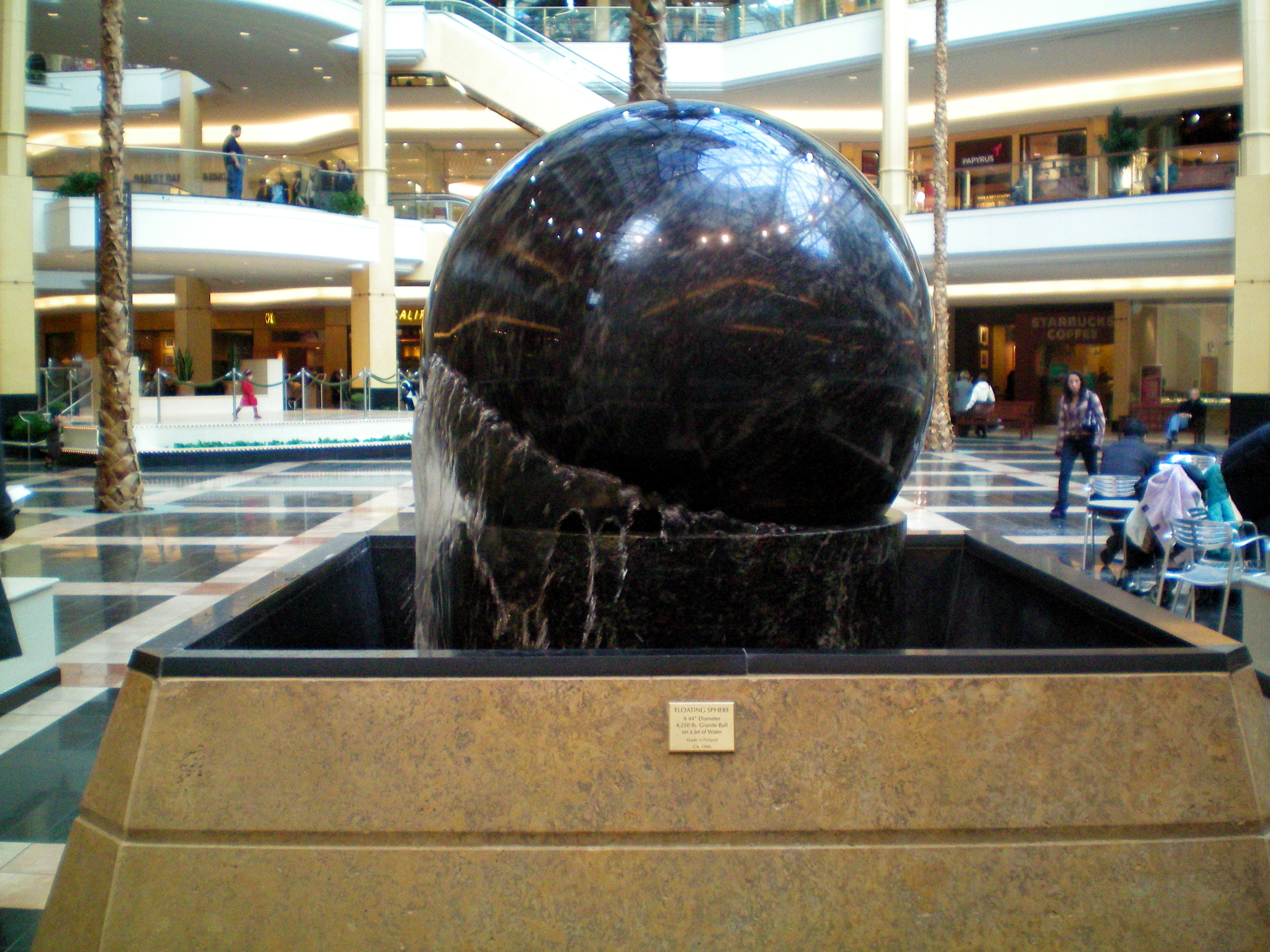
One of the two Granite Sorvikivi Floating Stone spheres at Somerset Collection North.

== See also ==
- Architecture of metropolitan Detroit
- Bal Harbour Shops
- Economy of metropolitan Detroit
- NorthPark Center
- Simon Property Group
- Tourism in metropolitan Detroit
