= Romeo State Airport =

- IATA: none; ICAO: none; FAA LID: D98

Summary
- Airport type: Public
- Operator: State of Michigan
- Location: Romeo, Michigan
- Elevation AMSL: 738.5 ft / 225 m
- Coordinates: 42.79768°N 82.97587°W

Map
- Location of airport in Michigan D98 (the United States)

Runways
Direction	Length		Surface
Direction	ft	m	Surface
18/36	4,000	1,219	Asphalt

Statistics
- Aircraft movements (2021): 15,000
- Based aircraft (2021): 30

Romeo State Airport (FAA LID: D98) is a public airport owned and operated by the State of Michigan located 2 miles (3.2 km) east of Romeo, Michigan, United States. The airport is uncontrolled and is used for general aviation purposes. It is included in the Federal Aviation Administration (FAA) National Plan of Integrated Airport Systems for 2017–2021, in which it is categorized as a local reliever airport facility.

== Facilities and aircraft ==
The airport has a single runway, designated as runway 18/36. Previously, the airport had an additional two runways: 15/33 and 9/27. These runways are currently closed and unusable, however a portion of the old 9/27 runway is currently used as a taxiway.

For the 12-month period ending December 31, 2021, the airport had 15,000 aircraft operations, an average of 41 per day. It consisted completely of general aviation. For the same time period, there are 30 aircraft based on the airport, all single-engine airplanes.

The airport has an FBO which offers fuel, hangars, a conference room, and other amenities.

== Accidents and incidents ==
- On April 5, 1990, a Beechcraft Bonanza crashed near Romeo State Airport due to pilot incapacitation.
- On November 22, 1991, a Beechcraft King Air crashed on approach to Romeo State due to the pilot's improper inflight decisionmaking and descent below minimum descent altitude during an instrument approach.
- On August 28, 2001, an American Champion Citabria sustained substantial damage during a forced landing after takeoff from Romeo State Airport. The aircraft experienced a loss of engine power after departing from Runway 33. The pilots tried to land on runway 9 but impacted the ground to the right of the runway. The reason for the loss of engine power is undetermined.
- On June 27, 2003, a Cessna 172 Skyhawk was substantially damaged during a go-around attempt at Romeo State. While the aircraft was landing on Runway 27, its right brake and wheel locked, and the aircraft departed the runway and struck a parked aircraft on the ramp. The probable cause was found to be the pilot's inability to maintain directional control during landing.
- On December 31, 2006, a Piper PA-32 Cherokee Six crashed while on the VOR approach to Romeo State. The probable cause of the aircraft was found to be the pilot's failure to maintain aircraft control nor a proper descent rate during the approach, with contributing factors including low clouds and moderate-to-heavy rain.
- On April 24, 2008, a Cessna 182 Skylane impacted terrain while attempting to land at Romeo State. The probable cause was found to be a misjudged landing flare by the pilot, and the inadequate landing gear inspection/repair procedure used by other maintenance personnel, resulting in the failure of the main landing gear strut during landing.
- On September 15, 2021, an American Eurocopter AS350 operated by the Oakland County Sheriff was substantially damaged during a hard landing while training at Romeo State. The aircraft is reported to have lost power 20 feet above the ground and dropped down to the asphalt below. The aircraft's fuel control lever was not fully engaged at the time.

== See also ==
- List of airports in Michigan
