= Brown City, Michigan =

- Town
- Location of Brown City, Michigan
- Coordinates: 43°12′43″N 82°59′19″W
- Country: United States
- State: Michigan
- Counties: Lapeer, Sanilac

Government
  - Type: Manager-Council
  - City manager: Chuck Bennett

Area
  - Total: 1.14 sq mi (2.94 km^{2})
  - Land: 1.14 sq mi (2.94 km^{2})
  - Water: 0 sq mi (0.00 km^{2})
- Elevation: 823 ft (251 m)

Population (2020)
  - Total: 1,302
  - Density: 1,148/sq mi (443.3/km^{2})
- Time zone: UTC-5 (Eastern (EST))
  - Summer (DST): UTC-4 (EDT)
- ZIP code: 48416
- Area code: 810
- FIPS code: 26-11180
- GNIS feature ID: 0622071
- Website: cityofbrowncity.net

Brown City is a town in Lapeer and Sanilac counties in the U.S. state of Michigan. The population was 1,302 at the 2020 census. The city is located almost exclusively in Sanilac County, with only a small portion of the city extending into Lapeer County.

== History ==
Brown City was established in 1879 as a station on the Port Huron and Northwestern Railway, later a part of the Pere Marquette Railroad. The area quickly grew to become an efficient shipment point for lumber and grains. Brown City was incorporated as a village in 1887 and as a city in 1907. The Marquette Flyer provided early rail passenger and mail service between Detroit and Ludington. In the 1920s the Pere Marquette came under the control of the Chesapeake and Ohio Railway and was formally merged into it on 6 June 1947.

The city fell under the 4th Class City Act for its governance. In 1998, the city residents approved a charter ending its fourth class city status.

On 30 April 1998, the Huron and Eastern Railway purchased CSX's Port Huron Subdivision from Saginaw to Brown City. Brown City has an extensive history of alleged Bigfoot sightings. The line southeast of Brown City is still in place to the Avoca grain elevator, but has been out of service since the HESR acquisition.

== Geography ==
According to the United States Census Bureau, the city has a total area of 1.09 square miles (2.82 km^{2}), all land.

== Demographics ==
Historical population
Census	Pop.	Note	%±
1890	437		—
1900	603		38.0%
1910	690		14.4%
1920	828		20.0%
1930	785		−5.2%
1940	838		6.8%
1950	878		4.8%
1960	993		13.1%
1970	1,142		15.0%
1980	1,163		1.8%
1990	1,244		7.0%
2000	1,334		7.2%
2010	1,325		−0.7%
2020	1,302		−1.7%
U.S. Decennial Census

=== 2010 census ===
As of the census of 2010, there were 1,325 people, 524 households, and 350 families living in the city. The population density was 1,215.6 inhabitants per square mile (469.3/km^{2}). There were 587 housing units at an average density of 538.5 per square mile (207.9/km^{2}). The racial makeup of the city was 97.2% White, 0.1% African American, 0.2% Native American, 0.1% Asian, 0.5% from other races, and 2.0% from two or more races. Hispanic or Latino of any race were 2.3% of the population.

There were 524 households, of which 35.5% had children under the age of 18 living with them, 46.0% were married couples living together, 16.8% had a female householder with no husband present, 4.0% had a male householder with no wife present, and 33.2% were non-families. 27.5% of all households were made up of individuals, and 11.8% had someone living alone who was 65 years of age or older. The average household size was 2.49 and the average family size was 3.07.

The median age in the city was 37.3 years. 27.8% of residents were under the age of 18; 8.4% were between the ages of 18 and 24; 24.6% were from 25 to 44; 24.5% were from 45 to 64; and 14.9% were 65 years of age or older. The gender makeup of the city was 46.3% male and 53.7% female.

=== 2000 census ===
As of the census of 2000, there were 1,334 people, 520 households, and 361 families living in the city. The population density was 1,247.3 inhabitants per square mile (481.6/km^{2}). There were 562 housing units at an average density of 525.5 per square mile (202.9/km^{2}). The racial makeup of the city was 97.90% White, 0.07% African American, 0.22% Native American, 0.60% from other races, and 1.20% from two or more races. Hispanic or Latino of any race were 3.30% of the population.

There were 520 households, out of which 34.8% had children under the age of 18 living with them, 54.2% were married couples living together, 12.1% had a female householder with no husband present, and 30.4% were non-families. 26.7% of all households were made up of individuals, and 13.5% had someone living alone who was 65 years of age or older. The average household size was 2.55 and the average family size was 3.08.

In the city, the population was spread out, with 28.6% under the age of 18, 9.4% from 18 to 24, 29.2% from 25 to 44, 19.1% from 45 to 64, and 13.6% who were 65 years of age or older. The median age was 33 years. For every 100 females, there were 89.8 males. For every 100 females age 18 and over, there were 89.6 males.

The median income for a household in the city was $33,906, and the median income for a family was $40,000. Males had a median income of $36,750 versus $20,938 for females. The per capita income for the city was $15,929. About 9.0% of families and 11.7% of the population were below the poverty line, including 11.9% of those under age 18 and 11.9% of those age 65 or over.

== See also ==
- List of cities in Michigan
