= List of churches in the Diocese of Saginaw =

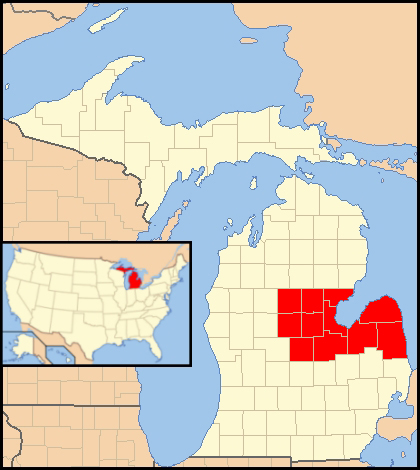
Diocese of Saginaw in red

This is a list of current and former Roman Catholic churches in the Roman Catholic Diocese of Saginaw. The archdiocese is located in Central Michigan and The Thumb and includes the cities of Bay City, Midland, and Saginaw, and 11 counties.

The cathedral church of the diocese is the Cathedral of Mary of the Assumption, built from 1901 to 1903 in Saginaw.

== Bay County ==
Name	Image	Location	Description/notes
All Saints Parish		St. Boniface Church, 500 N. Lincoln Ave, Bay City	Became part of All Saints Parish in 2014
		St. James Church, 710 Columbus Ave, Bay City	Became part of All Saints Parish in 2014
		Our Lady of Guadalupe Church	Became part of All Saints Parish in 2014
St. Gabriel Parish		St. Anthony Church, 1492 W. Midland Rd, Auburn	Current church completed in 1978; part of St. Gabriel Parish since 2014
		St. Joseph Church, 84 W. Midland Rd, Auburn	Relocated to present location in 1962; part of St. Gabriel Parish since 2014
Corpus Christi Parish		Holy Trinity Church, 1008 S. Wenona, Bay City	Now part of Corpus Christ Parish
		St. Hedwig Church, 601 W. Pearl St, Bay City	Now part of Corpus Christi Parish
Our Lady of Czestochowa Parish		St. Hyacinth Church, 1515 Cass Ave, Bay City	Founded in 1905, current church built between 1950 and 1952. Became part of Our Lady of Czestochowa Parish in 2014
		St. Stanislaus Kostka Church, 1503 Kosciuszko Ave, Bay City	Neo-Gothic church built between 1890 and 1892 to serve Polish immigrants; registered as a Michigan Historic Site. Became part of Our Lady of Czestochowa Parish in 2014
Our Lady of Peace Parish		St. Mary of the Assumption Church, 607 S. Union St, Bay City	Became part of Our Lady of Peace Parish in 2014
		Our Lady of the Visitation Church	Became part of Our Lady of Peace Parish in 2014
Sacred Heart		1000 E. Beaver Rd, Kawkawlin	Current church built in 1970
St. Anne		315 W. Center St, Linwood	Romanesque brick church with bell tower dedicated 1921
St. Catherine of Siena		2956 E. North Union Rd, Bay City	Formerly St. Vincent de Paul Parish, became St. Catherine of Siena Parish in 2014
St. Jude Thaddeus		614 Pine St, Essexville	St. John the Evangelist Church dedicated in 1998. Became part of St. Jude Thaddeus Parish in 2014
St. Valentine		999 9 Mile Rd, Kawkawlin	Current church dedicated in 1993

== Saginaw County ==
Name	Image	Location	Description/notes
Blessed Trinity		958 E. Tuscola St, Frankenmuth	Parish formed in 1967; church opened in 1976, remodeled in 2004
Cathedral of Mary of the Assumption		615 Hoyt Ave, Saginaw	Cathedral dedicated in 1903
Christ the Good Shepherd Parish		St. Andrew Church, 612 N. Michigan Ave, Saginaw	Founded in 1852, St. Andrew was the oldest parish in Saginaw. It became part of Christ the Good Shepherd Parish in 2014
		St. Helen Church, 2445 N. Charles St, Saginaw	Merged with St. Andrew in 2014 to form Christ the Good Shepherd Parish
Holy Family		1525 S. Washington Ave, Saginaw	Parish founded in 1893; current church built from 1916 to 1924
Holy Spirit		1035 N. River Rd, Saginaw	Established in 1959
Mary of the Immaculate Conception Parish		St. Mary Church, 5661 Fergus Rd, Albee	Founded as a mission in the 1890s, church dedicated in 1955. Became part of Mary of the Immaculate Conception Parish in 2013
Immaculate Conception Church	Immaculate Conception-St. Charles	708 Sanderson St, St. Charles	Founded as a mission in 1888, became a parish in 1927. Current church dedicated in 1957. Became part of Mary of the Immaculate Conception Parish in 2013
Ss. Francis and Clare Parish		Sacred Heart Church, 12157 Church St, Birch Run	Now part of Ss. Francis & Clare Parish
St. Agnes		300 Johnson St, Freeland	
St. Elizabeth of Hungary		12835 E. Washington Rd, Reese	
St. Dominic Parish		Ss. Peter and Paul Church, 4735 W. Michigan Ave, Saginaw	Founded in 1864, current church dedicated in 1999. Now part of St. Dominic Parish
		St. Stephen Church, 1310 Malzahn St, Saginaw	Now part of St. Dominic Parish
St. Francis of Assisi Parish		St. Anthony of Padua Church, 3680 S. Washington Rd, Saginaw	Now part of St. Francis of Assisi Parish
		St. Casimir Church, 2122 S. Jefferson Ave, Saginaw	Now part of St. Francis of Assisi Parish
St. Francis de Sales Parish		St Christopher Church, 3945 Williamson Rd, Saginaw	Founded in 1950, current church dedicated in 1961. Became part of St. Francis de Sales Parish in 2014
		Ss. Simon and Jude Church, Saginaw	Founded in 1992 from the merger of five churches in Saginaw. Became part of St. Francis de Sales Parish in 2014
St. John Paul II Parish		St. Josaphat Church, 469 Shattuck Rd, Saginaw	Became part of St. John Paul II Parish in 2014
		St. Matthew Church, 511 W. Cornell, Zilwaukee	Became part of St. John Paul II Parish in 2014
St. John Vianney		6400 McCarty Rd, Saginaw	
St. Joseph		936 N. 6th Ave, Saginaw	Parish established in 1872; new church dedicated in 2003
St. Peter Parish		St. Michael Church, 17994 Lincoln Rd, New Lothrop	Founded in 1865, current church dedicated in 1920. Now part of St. Peter Parish
St. Michael Church		509 Parshall St, Oakley	Now part of St. Peter Parish
Our Lady of Perpetual Help Parish	Our Lady of Perputal Help-Chesaning	404 S. Wood St, Chesaning	Now part of St. Peter Parish
St. Thomas Aquinas		5376 State St, Saginaw	Parish established in 1953; current church built between 1973 and 1974

== North Diocese ==
Name	Image	Location	Description/notes
Holy Trinity Parish		St. Mary Church, 739 W. Cody Estey Rd, Pinconning	Founded as a mission in the early 1900s, church dedicated in 1939. Became part of Holy Trinity Parish in 2015
		St. Michael Church, 225 S. Jennings St, Pinconning	Founded as a mission in 1887, became a parish in 1891. Current church dedicated in 1961. Became part of Holy Trinity Parish in 2015
Our Lady of Grace Parish		St. Anne Church, 5738 M-30, Edenville	Now part of Our Lady of Grace Parish
		St. Agnes Church, 2500 N W River Rd, Sanford	Founded in the 1890s Now part of Our Lady of Grace Parish
Our Lady of Hope Parish	St. Cecilia-Clare	St. Cecelia Church, 106 E. Wheaton Ave, Clare	Now part of Our Lady of Hope Parish
	St. Henry-Rosebush	St. Henry Church, 4079 E. Vernon Rd, Rosebush	Now part of Our Lady of Hope Parish
Resurrection of the Lord Parish		St. Joseph Church, 7842 Newberry Rd, Alger	Now part of Resurrection of the Lord Parish
		Resurrection Church, 423 W. Cedar St, Standish	Now part of Resurrection of the Lord Parish
Sacred Heart		330 N. Silverleaf St, Gladwin	Church built in 1961
St. Athanasius		310 S. Broad St, Harrison	
St. Mark		415 S. Court St, Au Gres	

== Thumb Region ==
Name	Image	Location	Description/notes
Annunciation of the Lord Parish	St. Michael-Port Austin	St. Michael Church, 8661 Independence St, Port Austin	Founded in the 1860s, current church dedicated in 1884. Became part of Annunciation of the Lord Parish in 2013
	St. Edwards the Confessor-Kinde	St. Edward the Confessor Church, 5088 Clinton St, Kinde	Founded as mission in the early 1900s, church dedicated in 1912, became a parish in 1917. Merged with St. Mary in 1982. Became part of Annunciation of the Lord Parish in 2013
	St. Mary’s Czesłochowa-Kinde	St. Mary of Czestochowa Church, 1709 Moeller Rd, Kinde	Merged with St. Edward in 1982. Became part of Annunciation of the Lord Parish in 2013
Ave Maria Parish	St. John-Peck	St. John the Evangelist Church 5335 S. Sandusky Rd, Peck	Now part of Ave Maria Parish
		St. Patrick Church, Croswell	Former parish; merged into Ave Maria Parish
		St. Mary Our Lady of Sorrows Church, Port Sanilac	Church building moved to its present location in 1950; now part of Ave Maria Parish
	St. Denis-Lexington	St. Denis Church, 5366 Main St, Lexington	Built between 1880 and 1882; now part of Ave Maria Parish
Good Shepherd Parish	St. Joseph-Snover	St. Joseph Church, 4960 N. Ubly Rd, Argyle	Now part of Good Shepherd Parish
		St. Columbkille Church, 3031 McAlpin Rd, Ubly	Sheridan Corners; part of Good Shepherd Parish
	St. Ignatius-Ubly	St. Ignatius Church, 1826 Cumber Rd, Ubly	Frieburg; now part of Good Shepherd Parish
	St. John the Evangilist-Ubly	St. John the Evangelist Church 4470 N. Washington St, Ubly	Now part of Good Shepherd Parish
Holy Apostles Parish		St. John Chrysostom Church, 7938 3rd St, Forestville	Now part of Holy Apostles Parish
	Ss. Peter and Paul-Ruth	Ss. Peter and Paul Church, 7121 E. Atwater Rd, Ruth	Now part of Holy Apostles Parish
Holy Family Parish	St. Elizabeth Church-Marlette	St. Elizabeth Church, 6817 W. Marlette St, Marlette	Now part of Holy Family Parish
	St. Joseph-Sandusky	St. Joseph Church, 59 N. Moore St, Sandusky	Now part of Holy Family Parish
Holy Name of Mary Parish	Our Lady of Lake Huron-Harbor Beach	Our Lady of Lake Huron, 413 S. First St, Harbor Beach	Established in 1882; now part of Holy Name of Mary Parish
	St. Anthony of Padua-Harbor Beach	St. Anthony of Padua Church, 8239 Helena Rd, Helena	Now part of Holy Name of Mary Parish
Our Lady Consolata Parish		St. Pancratius Church, 4292 Seeger St, Cass City	Now part of Our Lady Consolata Parish
		St. Michael Church, 1951 S. Kingston Rd, Deford	Now part of Our Lady Consolata Parish
	St. Agatha-Gagetown	St. Agatha Church, 4618 South St, Gagetown	Now part of Our Lady Consolata Parish
	Holy Family-Sebewaing	Holy Family Church, 8370 Unionville Rd, Sebewaing	Now part of Our Lady Consolata Parish
Our Lady of Perpetual Help Parish	St. Francis Borgia-Pigeon	St. Francis Borgia Church, 15 Moeller St, Pigeon	Now part of Our Lady of Perpetual Help Parish
	St. Roch-Caseville	St. Roch Church, 6253 Main St, Caseville	Now part of Our Lady of Perpetual Help Parish
		St. Felix of Valois Church, Pinnebog	Now part of Our Lady of Perpetual Help Parish
St. Christopher Parish	St.Joseph Church-Mayville	St. Joseph Church, 315 W. Ohmer Rd, Mayville	Founded as a mission in 1951, current church dedicated in 1963 Now part of St. Christopher Parish
	Sacred Heart-Caro	Sacred Heart Church, 910 W. Frank St, Caro	Founded in 1902, current church dedicated in 1963. Now part of St. Christopher Parish
St. Hubert Parish	St. Joseph-Bad Axe	St. Joseph Church, 3455 Rapson Rd, Rapson	Founded as a mission in 1913, church dedicated that same year. Now part of St. Hubert Parish
	Sacred Heart Parish-Bad Axe	Sacred Heart Parish, 311 Whitelam St, Bad Axe	Now part of St. Hubert Parish
St. Isidore Parish		St. Patrick Church, 1891 Palms Rd, Palms	Church dedicated in the 1850s. Now part of St. Isidore Parish
	St. Mary-Ruth	St. Mary Church, 4190 Parisville Rd, Parisville	Now part of St. Isidore Parish

== West Diocese ==
Name	Image	Location	Description/notes
Assumption of the Blessed Virgin Mary		3516 E. Monroe Rd, Midland	Founded as a mission in 1916 to serve Polish and Slovak immigrants. Current church dedicated in 2000
Blessed Sacrament		3109 Swede Ave, Midland	Founded in 1951, current church dedicated in 1966
Most Sacred Heart of Jesus	Most Sacred Heart of Jesus-Mt. Pleasant	302 S. Kinney Ave, Mount Pleasant	Founded in the 1870s as St. Charles Parish, renamed in the 1880s. Current church dedicated in 1968
Nativity of the Lord Parish of Alma and St. Louis	Mount St. Joseph-St. Louis	Mount St. Joseph Church, 605 S. Franklin St., St. Louis	Now part of Nativity Parish
	St. Mary-Alma	St. Mary Church, 220 W. Downie St, Alma	Now part of Nativity Parish
St. Brigid of Kildare		207 Ashman St, Midland	Founded in 1870 as a mission to serve Irish immigrants. Current church dedicated in 1941
St. Cyril	St. Cyril-Bannister	517 E. Main St.,Bannister	Founded in the early 1910s for Czech and Slovak immigrants. Current church dedicated in 1960
St. Paul the Apostle Parish	St. Paul the Apostle-Ithaca	St. Paul the Apostle Church, 121 Union St., Ithaca	Founded as a mission in 1952, current church dedicated in 1969. Now merged with St. Martin de Porres Parish
	St. Martin de Porres-Perrinton	St. Martin de Porres Church 4010 Cleveland Rd.,Perrinton	Now merged with St. Paul the Apostle Parish.
St. Joseph the Worker	St. Joseph the Worker-Mt. Pleasant	2163 North Winn Road, Beal City	
St. Mary University Church	St. Mary University Church-Mt. Pleasant	1405 S. Washington St, Mt. Pleasant	Serves the Central Michigan University community
St. Vincent de Paul	St. Vincent de Paul-Shepherd	168 E. Wright Ave,Shepherd	
	St. Patrick-Shepherd	St. Patrick Church, 4315 West North County Line Rd, Shepherd	Now supervised by St. Vincent de Paul Parish

== Former churches ==
Name	Image	Location	Description/notes
St. George		3121 Sheridan, Saginaw	Building closed, sold in 2015
