= Burton Heights, Michigan =

Coordinates: 42°55′39.2″N 85°40′00.0″W

Burton Heights, Michigan was a small hamlet in Paris Township, Michigan, United States, established in 1833. It was annexed into Grand Rapids, Michigan in 1910.

== Sources ==
- Romig, Walter (1986). Michigan Place Names. Detroit: Wayne State University Press. pp. 89–90. ISBN 978-0-8143-1838-6 – via Google Books.
