= Rush Lake State Game Area =

Game reserve in Lake Township, Michigan

- Location within Michigan
- Location: Lake Township; Huron County, Michigan
- Nearest city: Caseville, Michigan
- Coordinates: 43°58′13″N 83°10′12″W
- Area: 2,166 acres (877 ha)
- Named for: Rush Lake
- Governing body: Michigan Department of Natural Resources

Rush Lake State Game Area is located in Lake Township, Huron County, Michigan. This area has been dedicated for wildlife conservation and management by the Michigan DNR Wildlife Division. The area is 2,102 acres in size and is being managed for the following featured species; eastern wild turkey, mallard, and common pheasant. The preserve can be transversed by an unimproved access called "Sand Road". Sand Road is considered an ancient First Nation trail that transverses the area along the dunes of the shore. Currently Sand Road runs from Caseville, Michigan to Port Austin, Michigan. The Rush Lake State Game area is known by locals for hunting and target shooting.
