= Parisville =

Parisville may refer to the following places:

- Parisville, Michigan
- Parisville, Quebec
