= Sherman Township, Huron County, Michigan =

Sherman Township, Michigan
- Civil township
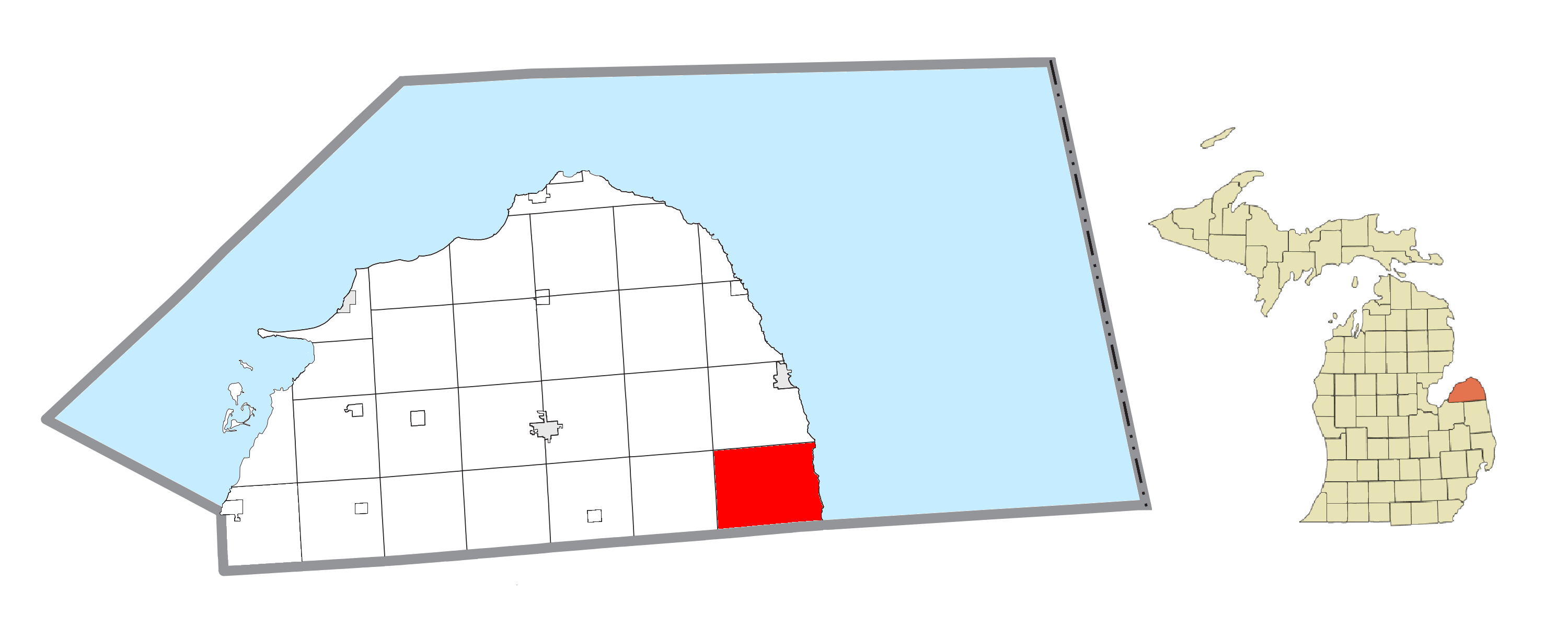
- Location within Huron County

- Location within the state of Michigan Sherman Township (the United States)
- Coordinates: 43°43′51″N 82°40′16″W
- Country: United States
- State: Michigan
- County: Huron

Area
  - Total: 44.2 sq mi (114.4 km^{2})
  - Land: 44.1 sq mi (114.3 km^{2})
  - Water: 0 sq mi (0.0 km^{2})
- Elevation: 720 ft (220 m)

Population (2020)
  - Total: 999
  - Density: 22.6/sq mi (8.74/km^{2})
- Time zone: UTC-5 (Eastern (EST))
  - Summer (DST): UTC-4 (EDT)
- ZIP code(s): 48441, 48456, 48470
- Area code: 989
- FIPS code: 26-73160
- GNIS feature ID: 1627071
- Website: https://shermantwphuronmi.gov/

Sherman Township is a civil township of Huron County in the U.S. state of Michigan. The population was 999 at the 2020 census.

== Communities ==
- Helena is an unincorporated community on the border with Sand Beach Township on Helena Road between Buhl and Klug Roads at 43°46′29″N 82°41′27″W.
- Ruth is an unincorporated community at 43°42′55″N 82°44′25″W. The ZIP code is 48470. The first white settler was John Hunsanger, a native of Hadhomor, Nassau, Germany, who arrived there in 1855. The following year, several families from Baden joined him, and in the early 1860s, another group arrived from Westphalia. The area became known as the "German Settlement". It was also called "Adams Corners" for landowner August H. Adams, who served as the first postmaster. But when the village got a post office in October 1880, it was named "Ruth", after Michael Ruth who had given property for a railroad depot.
- White Rock is an unincorporated community in the southeast part of the township at 43°42′36″N 82°36′35″W. The community is named for a large white limestone boulder offshore in Lake Huron, to define the territory ceded with the Treaty of Detroit in 1807.

== Geography ==
According to the United States Census Bureau, the township has a total area of 44.2 square miles (114.3 km^{2}), of which 44.1 square miles (114.3 km^{2}) is land and 0.02% is water.

== Demographics ==
As of the census of 2000, there were 1,165 people, 444 households, and 343 families residing in the township. The population density was 26.4 inhabitants per square mile (10.2/km^{2}). There were 620 housing units at an average density of 14.0 per square mile (5.4/km^{2}). The racial makeup of the township was 98.54% White, 0.69% Asian, 0.34% from other races, and 0.43% from two or more races. Hispanic or Latino of any race were 1.03% of the population.

There were 444 households, out of which 33.3% had children under the age of 18 living with them, 69.4% were married couples living together, 4.1% had a female householder with no husband present, and 22.7% were non-families. 20.9% of all households were made up of individuals, and 10.8% had someone living alone who was 65 years of age or older. The average household size was 2.62 and the average family size was 3.06.

In the township the population was spread out, with 28.0% under the age of 18, 6.0% from 18 to 24, 24.3% from 25 to 44, 25.6% from 45 to 64, and 16.1% who were 65 years of age or older. The median age was 39 years. For every 100 females, there were 106.2 males. For every 100 females age 18 and over, there were 102.7 males.

The median income for a household in the township was $32,875, and the median income for a family was $38,417. Males had a median income of $29,107 versus $17,109 for females. The per capita income for the township was $15,013. About 5.6% of families and 6.3% of the population were below the poverty line, including 5.5% of those under age 18 and 8.8% of those age 65 or over.
