= Albert E. Sleeper State Park =

State park in Michigan, United States

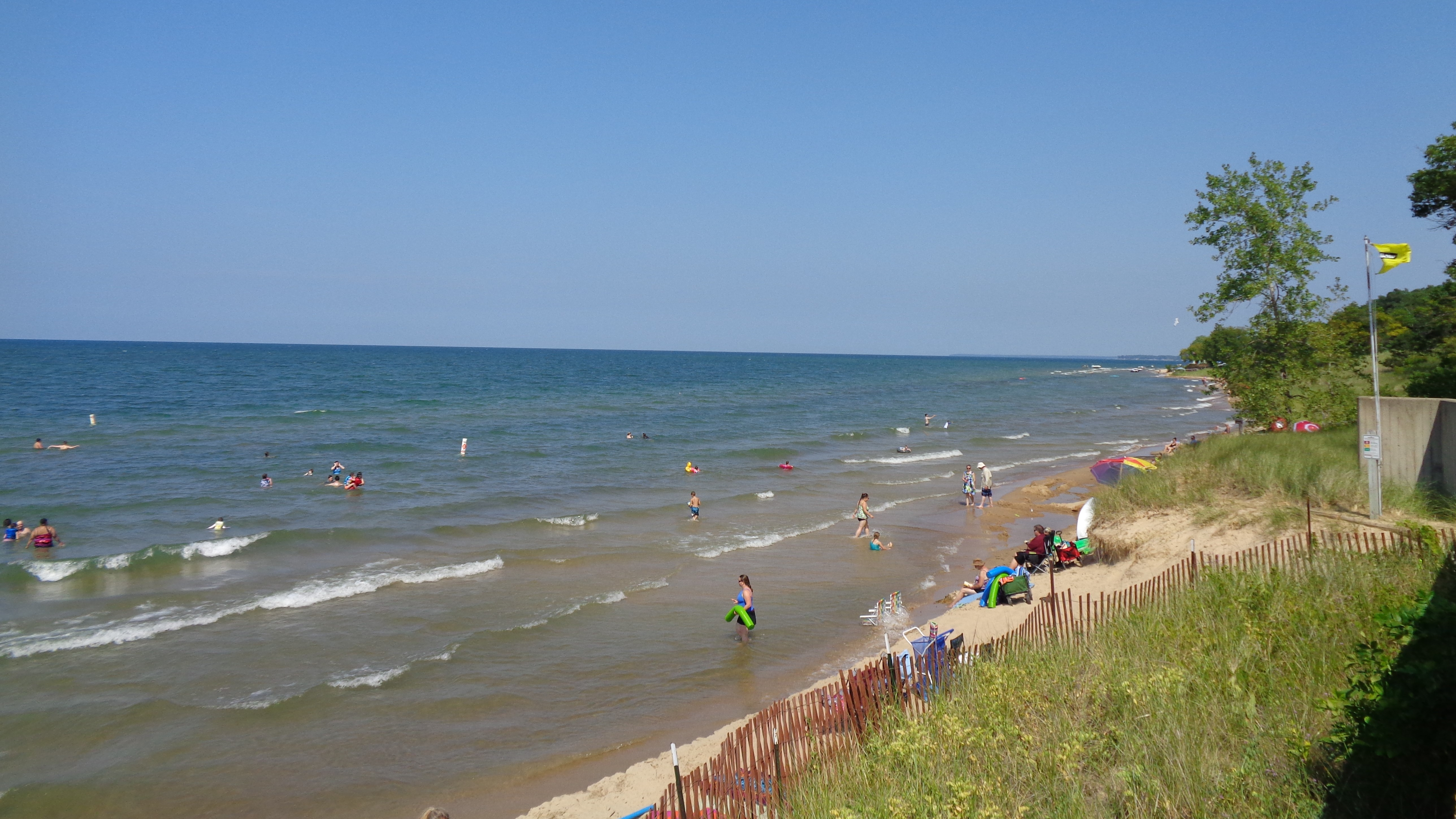
- Beachfront along Lake Huron

- Location within Michigan Location within the United States
- Location: Huron County, Michigan, United States
- Nearest city: Caseville, Michigan
- Coordinates: 43°58′24″N 83°12′16″W
- Area: 723 acres (293 ha)
- Elevation: 600 feet (180 m)
- Established: 1925 County Park; 1927 Huron State Park; 1944 Albert E. Sleeper State Park
- Administrator: Michigan Department of Natural Resources
- Designation: Michigan state park
- Website: Official website

Albert E. Sleeper State Park is a public recreation area on Lake Huron in Lake Township, Huron County, Michigan. The state park encompasses 723 acres (293 ha) four miles northeast of Caseville, close to the tip of The Thumb of Michigan.

== History ==
The park was created in 1925 by Huron County; it became a state park in 1927. The Civilian Conservation Corps was active in the park in the 1940s, building the park's Outdoor Center. In 1944, the park was renamed to honor former Michigan Governor Albert E. Sleeper, who signed the legislation authorizing the state park system.

Economic analysis

According to a 2008 economic impact analysis, Albert E. Sleeper State Park has a significant effect on the economy of the surrounding county, accounting for $5.476 million in direct spending, 144 direct jobs, and $2.881 million in value added. There is additional economic effect from secondary effects, totaling $7.905 million (44.9 percent over direct spending), 181 jobs (25.7 percent over direct job impacts), and $4.396 million (52.6 percent over direct value added).

== Activities and amenities ==
The park's recreational features include a half-mile beach on Saginaw Bay, four miles of trails for hiking, biking and cross-country skiing, picnicking areas, cabins, and campground.
