= Chandler Township, Huron County, Michigan =

Chandler Township, Michigan
- Civil township
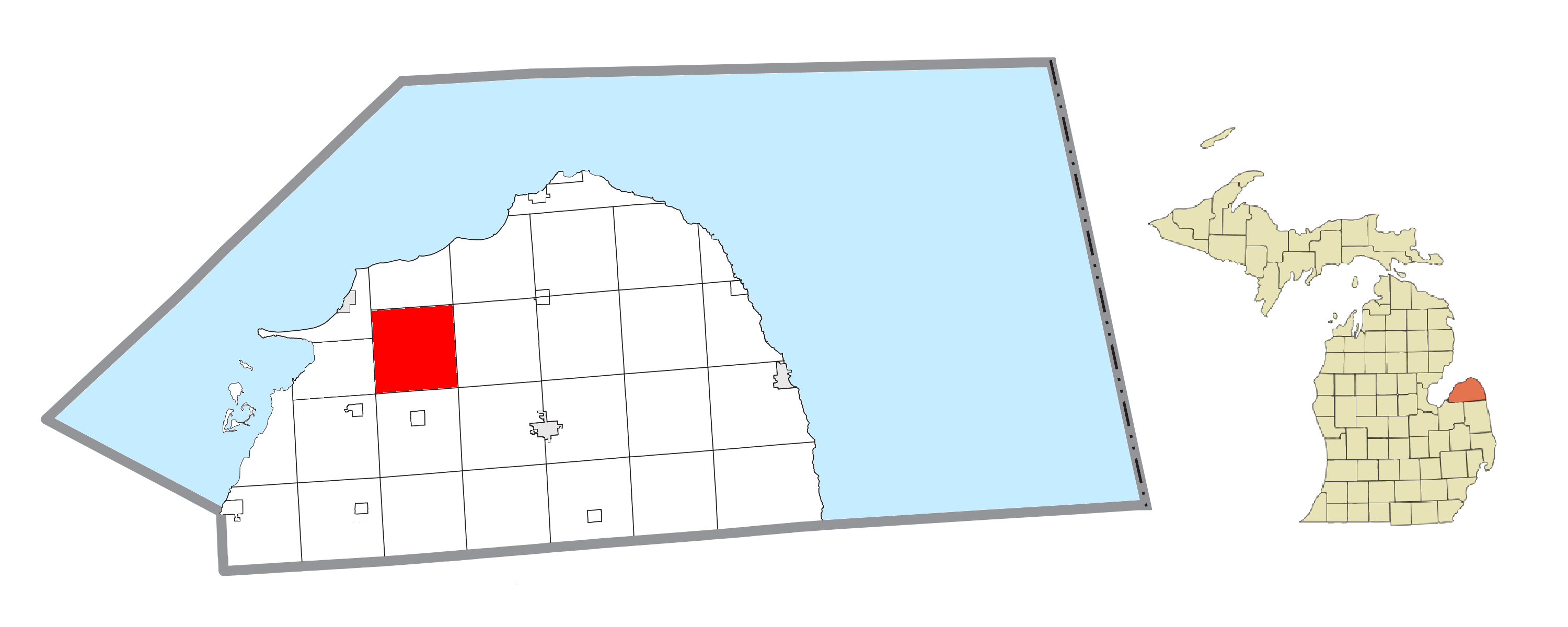
- Location within Huron County

- Location within the state of Michigan Chandler Township (the United States)
- Coordinates: 43°53′18″N 83°10′20″W
- Country: United States
- State: Michigan
- County: Huron
- Organized: 1879

Area
  - Total: 35.3 sq mi (91.5 km^{2})
  - Land: 35.3 sq mi (91.5 km^{2})
  - Water: 0 sq mi (0.0 km^{2})
- Elevation: 630 ft (192 m)

Population (2020)
  - Total: 454
  - Density: 12.9/sq mi (4.96/km^{2})
- Time zone: UTC-5 (Eastern (EST))
  - Summer (DST): UTC-4 (EDT)
- ZIP code(s): 48445, 48725, 48731, 48755
- Area code: 989
- FIPS code: 26-14600
- GNIS feature ID: 1626057

Chandler Township is a civil township of Huron County in the U.S. state of Michigan. The population was 454 at the 2020 census. The township was organized in 1879.

== Geography ==
According to the United States Census Bureau, the township has a total area of 35.3 square miles (91 km^{2}), all land.

== Demographics ==
As of the census of 2000, there were 501 people, 176 households, and 146 families residing in the township. The population density was 14.2 inhabitants per square mile (5.5/km^{2}). There were 199 housing units at an average density of 5.6 per square mile (2.2/km^{2}). The racial makeup of the township was 95.61% White, 0.80% African American, 0.40% Native American, 1.40% Asian, 1.40% from other races, and 0.40% from two or more races. Hispanic or Latino of any race were 1.80% of the population.

There were 176 households, out of which 39.2% had children under the age of 18 living with them, 71.6% were married couples living together, 9.1% had a female householder with no husband present, and 17.0% were non-families. 14.2% of all households were made up of individuals, and 5.7% had someone living alone who was 65 years of age or older. The average household size was 2.84 and the average family size was 3.15.

In the township the population was spread out, with 27.7% under the age of 18, 6.2% from 18 to 24, 29.7% from 25 to 44, 21.0% from 45 to 64, and 15.4% who were 65 years of age or older. The median age was 38 years. For every 100 females, there were 107.0 males. For every 100 females age 18 and over, there were 106.9 males.

The median income for a household in the township was $40,938, and the median income for a family was $43,571. Males had a median income of $32,250 versus $20,625 for females. The per capita income for the township was $16,540. About 5.1% of families and 6.6% of the population were below the poverty line, including 7.8% of those under age 18 and none of those age 65 or over.
