= Lake Township, Huron County, Michigan =

Lake Township, Michigan
- Civil township
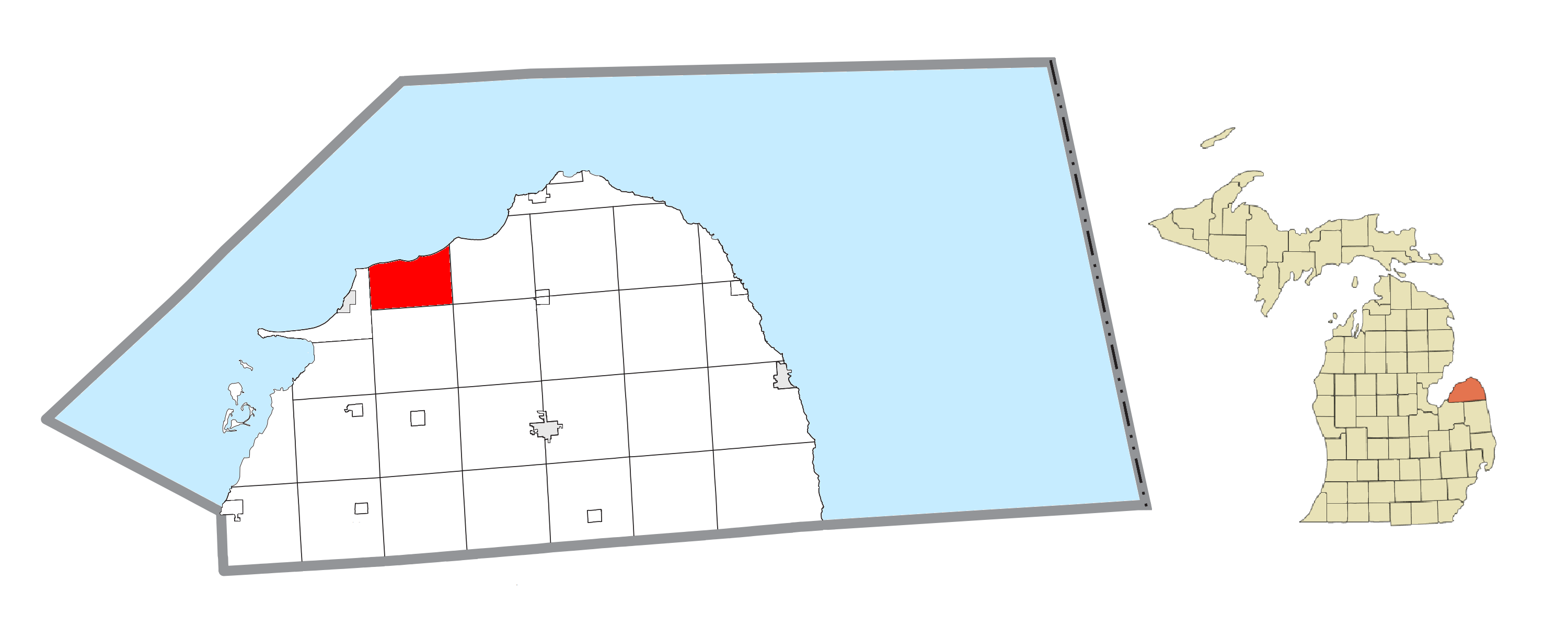
- Location within Huron County

- Location within the state of Michigan Lake Township (the United States)
- Coordinates: 43°57′31″N 83°11′34″W
- Country: United States
- State: Michigan
- County: Huron
- Organized: 1867

Area
  - Total: 20.7 sq mi (53.7 km^{2})
  - Land: 19.2 sq mi (49.7 km^{2})
  - Water: 1.5 sq mi (4.0 km^{2})
- Elevation: 597 ft (182 m)

Population (2020)
  - Total: 657
  - Density: 34.2/sq mi (13.2/km^{2})
- Time zone: UTC-5 (Eastern (EST))
  - Summer (DST): UTC-4 (EDT)
- ZIP code(s): 48445, 48467, 48725
- Area code: 989
- FIPS code: 26-44300
- GNIS feature ID: 1626573
- Website: Official website

Lake Township is a civil township of Huron County in the U.S. state of Michigan. The population was 657 at the 2020 census.

Albert E. Sleeper State Park and Rush Lake State Game Area are both within the township.

== Geography ==
According to the United States Census Bureau, the township has a total area of 20.7 square miles (54 km^{2}), of which 19.2 square miles (50 km^{2}) is land and 1.5 square miles (3.9 km^{2}) (7.47%) is water.

== Communities ==
- Gotts Corners was a settlement here founded by Robert Gotts. It had a post office from 1895 until 1905.

== Demographics ==
As of the census of 2000, there were 996 people, 483 households, and 320 families residing in the township. The population density was 51.9 inhabitants per square mile (20.0/km^{2}). There were 1,393 housing units at an average density of 72.6 per square mile (28.0/km^{2}). The racial makeup of the township was 99.00% White, 0.70% Native American, 0.10% from other races, and 0.20% from two or more races. Hispanic or Latino of any race were 1.00% of the population.

There were 483 households, out of which 14.5% had children under the age of 18 living with them, 60.9% were married couples living together, 2.9% had a female householder with no husband present, and 33.7% were non-families. 31.1% of all households were made up of individuals, and 19.9% had someone living alone who was 65 years of age or older. The average household size was 2.06 and the average family size was 2.53.

In the township the population was spread out, with 13.3% under the age of 18, 4.8% from 18 to 24, 16.4% from 25 to 44, 29.7% from 45 to 64, and 35.8% who were 65 years of age or older. The median age was 56 years. For every 100 females, there were 96.4 males. For every 100 females age 18 and over, there were 92.9 males.

The median income for a household in the township was $32,708, and the median income for a family was $38,125. Males had a median income of $38,056 versus $23,750 for females. The per capita income for the township was $20,364. About 5.8% of families and 10.0% of the population were below the poverty line, including 21.5% of those under age 18 and 9.6% of those age 65 or over.
