= Verona Township, Michigan =

- Civil township
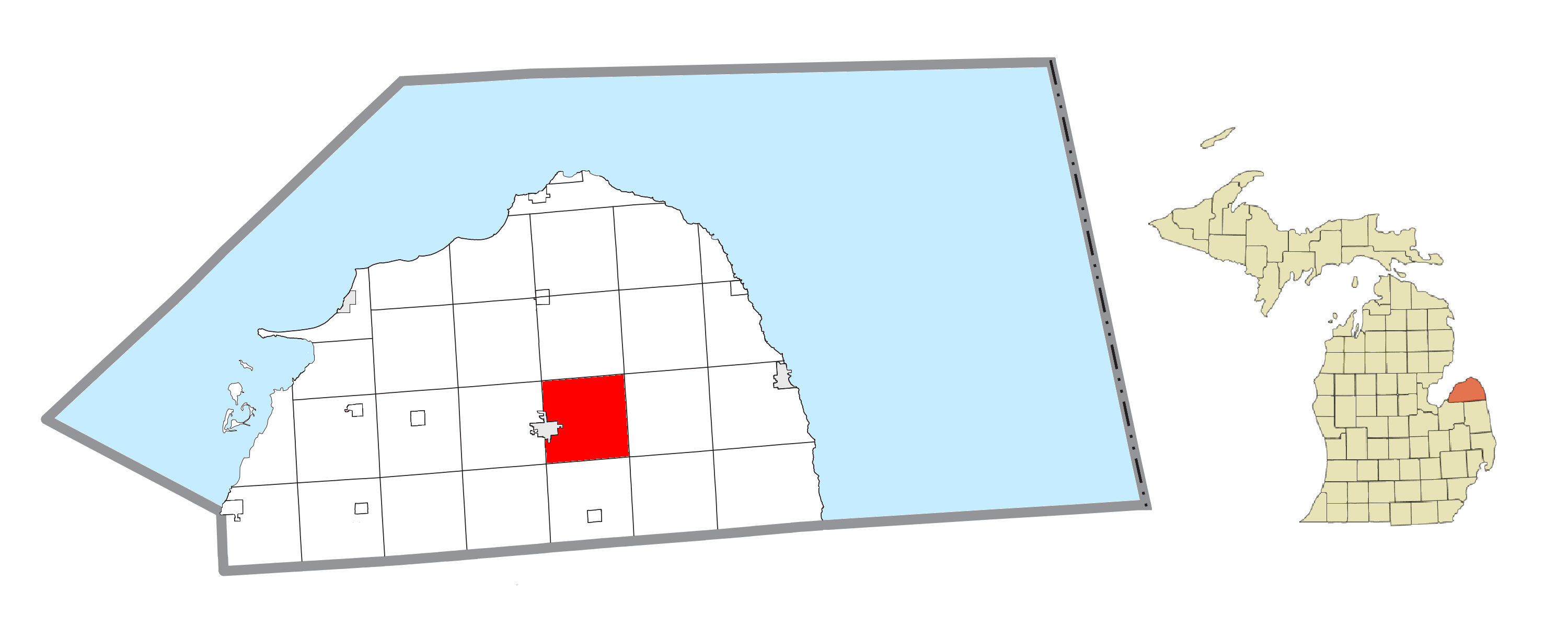
- Location within Huron County

- Location within the state of Michigan Verona Township (the United States)
- Coordinates: 43°48′40″N 82°57′05″W
- Country: United States
- State: Michigan
- County: Huron

Area
  - Total: 34.2 sq mi (88.5 km^{2})
  - Land: 34.1 sq mi (88.4 km^{2})
  - Water: 0.039 sq mi (0.1 km^{2})
- Elevation: 761 ft (232 m)

Population (2020)
  - Total: 1,210
  - Density: 35.5/sq mi (13.7/km^{2})
- Time zone: UTC-5 (Eastern (EST))
  - Summer (DST): UTC-4 (EDT)
- ZIP code(s): 48413
- Area code: 989
- FIPS code: 26-82140
- GNIS feature ID: 1627197
- Website: https://veronatownship.com/

Verona Township is a civil township of Huron County in the U.S. state of Michigan. The population was 1,210 at the 2020 census.

The city of Bad Axe is on the western boundary of the township but is politically autonomous.

== Communities ==
- Verona, Verona Hills or Verona Mills is an unincorporated community on the border with Sigel Township at Verona Road and M-142/Sand Beach Road. 43°48′21″N 83°52′52″W It was founded in 1858. A neighboring area called Bloomington or Bloomington Heights had a post office in the 1880s but later came to be considered part of Verona.
- Rapson is an unincorporated community on the northeast corner of the Township.

== Geography ==
According to the United States Census Bureau, the township has a total area of 34.2 square miles (89 km^{2}), of which 34.1 square miles (88 km^{2}) is land and 0.1 square miles (0.26 km^{2}) (0.15%) is water.

== Demographics ==
As of the census of 2000, there were 1,349 people, 483 households, and 374 families residing in the township. The population density was 39.5 inhabitants per square mile (15.3/km^{2}). There were 506 housing units at an average density of 14.8 per square mile (5.7/km^{2}). The racial makeup of the township was 98.37% White, 0.74% Native American, 0.44% Asian, 0.15% from other races, and 0.30% from two or more races. Hispanic or Latino of any race were 1.48% of the population.

There were 483 households, out of which 36.2% had children under the age of 18 living with them, 66.5% were married couples living together, 8.3% had a female householder with no husband present, and 22.4% were non-families. 17.8% of all households were made up of individuals, and 7.2% had someone living alone who was 65 years of age or older. The average household size was 2.76 and the average family size was 3.16.

In the township the population was spread out, with 27.7% under the age of 18, 6.0% from 18 to 24, 28.6% from 25 to 44, 24.0% from 45 to 64, and 13.6% who were 65 years of age or older. The median age was 38 years. For every 100 females, there were 94.9 males. For every 100 females age 18 and over, there were 97.8 males.

The median income for a household in the township was $44,028, and the median income for a family was $50,341. Males had a median income of $34,650 versus $23,125 for females. The per capita income for the township was $20,854. About 7.2% of families and 7.8% of the population were below the poverty line, including 7.0% of those under age 18 and 4.7% of those age 65 or over.
