= Bloomfield Township, Huron County, Michigan =

Bloomfield Township, Michigan
- Civil township
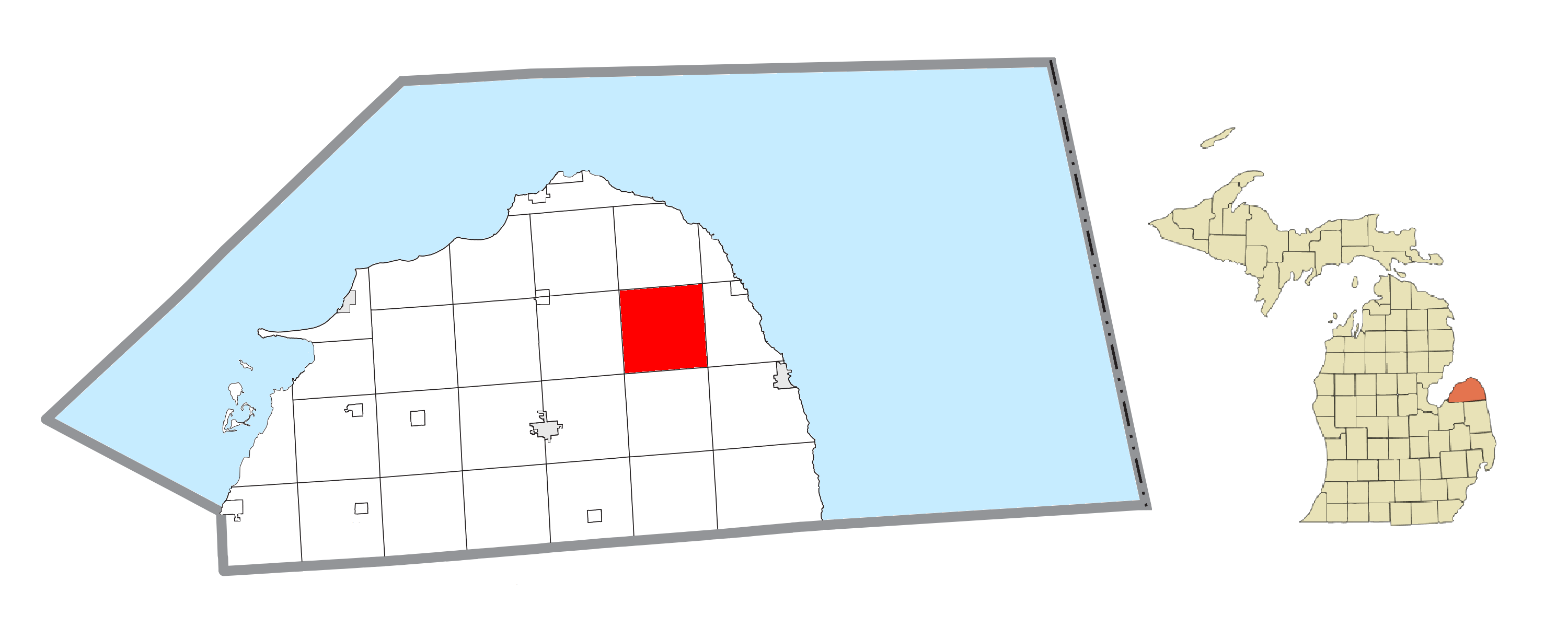
- Location within Huron County

- Location within the state of Michigan Bloomfield Township (the United States)
- Coordinates: 43°53′45″N 82°49′50″W
- Country: United States
- State: Michigan
- County: Huron

Area
  - Total: 36.0 sq mi (93.2 km^{2})
  - Land: 35.9 sq mi (93.1 km^{2})
  - Water: 0.039 sq mi (0.1 km^{2})
- Elevation: 715 ft (218 m)

Population (2020)
  - Total: 404
  - Density: 11.2/sq mi (4.34/km^{2})
- Time zone: UTC-5 (Eastern (EST))
  - Summer (DST): UTC-4 (EDT)
- ZIP code(s): 48303
- Area code: 989
- FIPS code: 26-09060
- GNIS feature ID: 1625950
- Website: https://www.bloomfieldtwp.org/

Bloomfield Township is a civil township of Huron County in the U.S. state of Michigan. As of the 2020 census, the township population was 404.

== Communities ==
- Lewisville is an unincorporated community in the township on the Boundary with Huron Township at the junction of Kinde and Huron City Roads 43°56′40″N 82°50′06″W .
- Rapson is an unincorporated community on the southwest corner of the Township.
- Redman is an unincorporated community in the Township at Redman and Huron City Roads 43°55′45″N 82°50′03″W (elevation: 712 ft./217 m.).

== Geography ==
According to the United States Census Bureau, the township has a total area of 36.0 square miles (93 km^{2}), of which 36.0 square miles (93 km^{2}) is land and 0.1 square miles (0.26 km^{2}) (0.14%) is water.

== Demographics ==
As of the census of 2000, there were 535 people, 191 households, and 151 families residing in the township. The population density was 14.9 inhabitants per square mile (5.8/km^{2}). There were 220 housing units at an average density of 6.1 per square mile (2.4/km^{2}). The racial makeup of the township was 97.38% White, 0.56% Native American, and 2.06% from two or more races. Hispanic or Latino of any race were 0.56% of the population.

There were 191 households, out of which 31.9% had children under the age of 18 living with them, 70.2% were married couples living together, 6.8% had a female householder with no husband present, and 20.9% were non-families. 17.3% of all households were made up of individuals, and 10.5% had someone living alone who was 65 years of age or older. The average household size was 2.80 and the average family size was 3.16.

In the township the population was spread out, with 26.7% under the age of 18, 6.5% from 18 to 24, 26.2% from 25 to 44, 25.4% from 45 to 64, and 15.1% who were 65 years of age or older. The median age was 38 years. For every 100 females, there were 106.6 males. For every 100 females age 18 and over, there were 105.2 males.

The median income for a household in the township was $40,000, and the median income for a family was $41,250. Males had a median income of $30,435 versus $18,438 for females. The per capita income for the township was $16,996. About 6.2% of families and 6.7% of the population were below the poverty line, including 6.1% of those under age 18 and 9.7% of those age 65 or over.
