= Gore Township, Michigan =

- Civil township
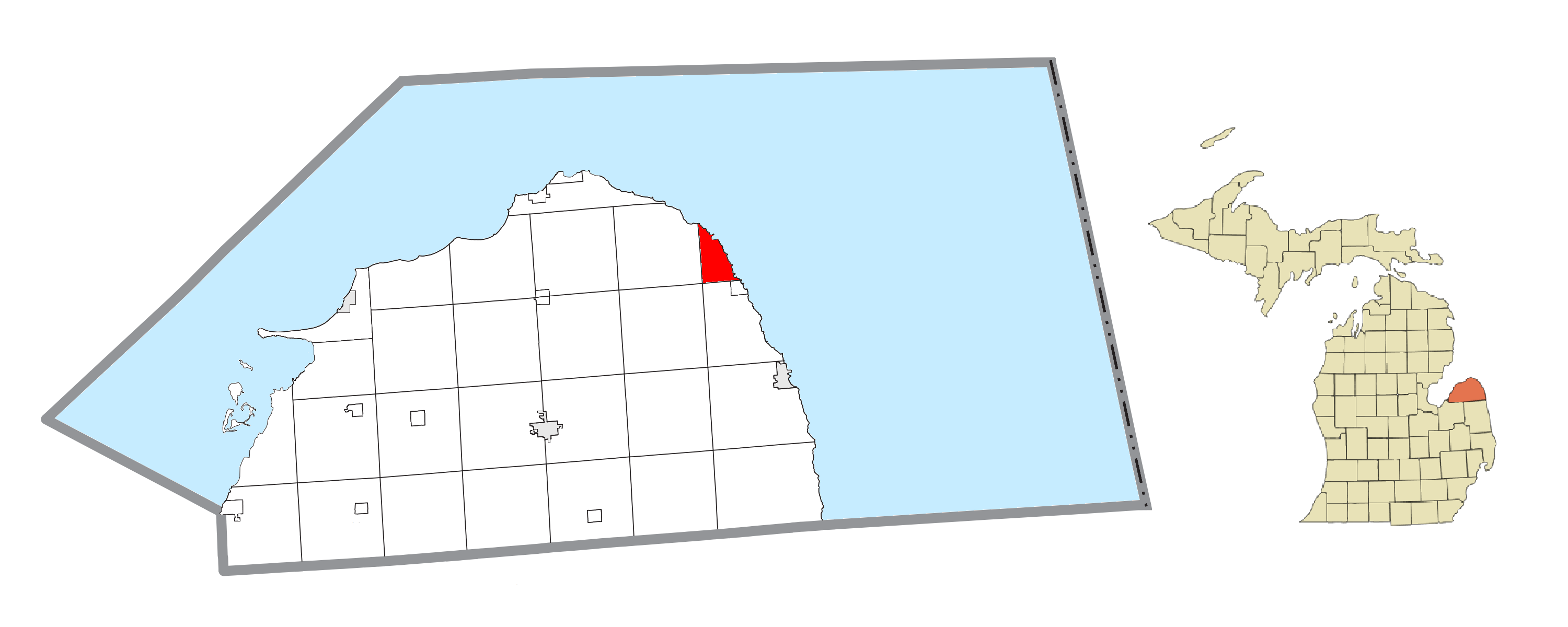
- Location within Huron County

- Location within the state of Michigan Gore Township (the United States)
- Coordinates: 43°58′09″N 82°45′23″W
- Country: United States
- State: Michigan
- County: Huron
- Established: 1862

Area
  - Total: 6.8 sq mi (17.7 km^{2})
  - Land: 6.8 sq mi (17.5 km^{2})
  - Water: 0.077 sq mi (0.2 km^{2})
- Elevation: 614 ft (187 m)

Population (2020)
  - Total: 152
  - Density: 22.5/sq mi (8.69/km^{2})
- Time zone: UTC-5 (Eastern (EST))
  - Summer (DST): UTC-4 (EDT)
- ZIP code(s): 48468
- Area code: 989
- FIPS code: 26-33080
- GNIS feature ID: 1626365

Gore Township is a civil township of Huron County in the U.S. state of Michigan. The population was 152 at the 2020 census.

Gore is a small, wedge-shaped township, consisting of only four full sections and six partial sections on the shore of Lake Huron just north of the village of Port Hope.

Gore Township was established in 1862.

== Geography ==
According to the United States Census Bureau, the township has a total area of 6.8 square miles (18 km^{2}), of which 6.8 square miles (18 km^{2}) is land and 0.1 square miles (0.26 km^{2}) (1.17%) is water.

== Demographics ==
As of the census of 2000, there were 139 people, 62 households, and 40 families residing in the township. The population density was 20.5 inhabitants per square mile (7.9/km^{2}). There were 176 housing units at an average density of 26.0 per square mile (10.0/km^{2}). The racial makeup of the township was 98.56% White, and 1.44% from two or more races. Hispanic or Latino of any race were 2.88% of the population.

There were 62 households, out of which 21.0% had children under the age of 18 living with them, 59.7% were married couples living together, 6.5% had a female householder with no husband present, and 33.9% were non-families. 30.6% of all households were made up of individuals, and 21.0% had someone living alone who was 65 years of age or older. The average household size was 2.21 and the average family size was 2.78.

In the township the population was spread out, with 20.9% under the age of 18, 0.7% from 18 to 24, 17.3% from 25 to 44, 38.8% from 45 to 64, and 22.3% who were 65 years of age or older. The median age was 49 years. For every 100 females, there were 93.1 males. For every 100 females age 18 and over, there were 96.4 males.

The median income for a household in the township was $25,625, and the median income for a family was $45,417. Males had a median income of $36,875 versus $13,750 for females. The per capita income for the township was $19,401. There were 22.0% of families and 16.5% of the population living below the poverty line, including 9.7% of under eighteens and 50.0% of those over 64.
