= Sigel Township, Michigan =

- Civil township
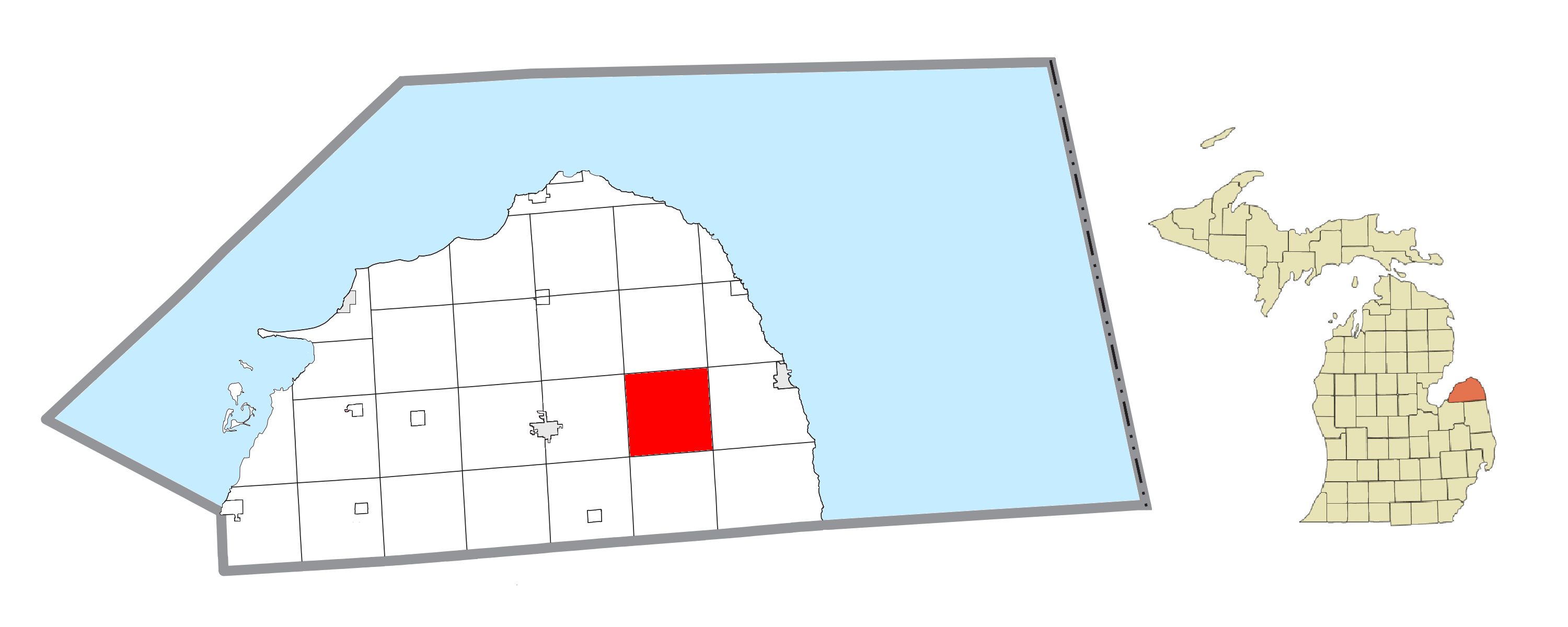
- Location within Huron County

- Location within the state of Michigan Sigel Township (the United States)
- Coordinates: 43°49′00″N 82°48′24″W
- Country: United States
- State: Michigan
- County: Huron

Area
  - Total: 35.8 sq mi (92.7 km^{2})
  - Land: 35.8 sq mi (92.7 km^{2})
  - Water: 0 sq mi (0.0 km^{2})
- Elevation: 751 ft (229 m)

Population (2020)
  - Total: 437
  - Density: 12.2/sq mi (4.71/km^{2})
- Time zone: UTC-5 (Eastern (EST))
  - Summer (DST): UTC-4 (EDT)
- ZIP code(s): 48413, 48441, 48470
- Area code: 989
- FIPS code: 26-73880
- GNIS feature ID: 1627082
- Website: https://www.sigeltownshipmi.gov/

Sigel Township is a civil township of Huron County in the U.S. state of Michigan. The population was 437 at the 2020 census.

== Communities ==
- Engle was a post office in this township from 1879 until 1887.
- Rapson is an unincorporated community on the northwest corner of the Township.
- Verona or Verona Mills is an unincorporated community on the border with Verona Township at Verona Road and M-142/Sand Beach Road. 43°48′21″N 83°52′52″W

== Geography ==
According to the United States Census Bureau, the township has a total area of 35.8 square miles (93 km^{2}), of which 35.8 square miles (93 km^{2}) is land and 0.03% is water.

== Demographics ==
As of the census of 2000, there were 576 people, 184 households, and 154 families residing in the township. The population density was 16.1 per square mile (6.2/km^{2}). There were 202 housing units at an average density of 5.6 per square mile (2.2/km^{2}). The racial makeup of the township was 97.57% White, 0.17% African American, 0.69% Native American, 0.35% Asian, and 1.22% from two or more races. Hispanic or Latino of any race were 0.17% of the population.

There were 184 households, out of which 42.9% had children under the age of 18 living with them, 74.5% were married couples living together, 6.0% had a female householder with no husband present, and 15.8% were non-families. 15.2% of all households were made up of individuals, and 5.4% had someone living alone who was 65 years of age or older. The average household size was 3.13 and the average family size was 3.47.

In the township the population was spread out, with 33.9% under the age of 18, 7.3% from 18 to 24, 27.3% from 25 to 44, 20.8% from 45 to 64, and 10.8% who were 65 years of age or older. The median age was 34 years. For every 100 females, there were 107.9 males. For every 100 females age 18 and over, there were 105.9 males.

The median income for a household in the township was $41,442, and the median income for a family was $44,583. Males had a median income of $32,059 versus $23,125 for females. The per capita income for the township was $16,264. About 5.8% of families and 7.8% of the population were below the poverty line, including 8.0% of those under age 18 and 3.2% of those age 65 or over.

== History ==
Directly west of Sand Beach township lies that of Sigel. It was organized some time prior to 1864 with Watson Robinson as the first supervisor on the records. He took up 80 acres (320,000 m^{2}) of land under the homestead act that same year. In the fire of '81 all of his buildings and crops were destroyed. He found himself the morning after the fire without a hat or shoes and practically destitute of clothing of any kind. With his accustomed energy and enterprise he began at once to rebuild and repair as far as possible the damage done by the fire.

The first settlers in this township were Fred Jurgess, Joseph Lakowski and Waterhouse Whitelam, who came in 1859. Samuel Williams was another pioneer in this section of the county. In the early lumbering days he had worked for Pack, Woods & Co., at Harbor Beach and later at Port Crescent. He moved on to his farm in Sigel soon after the fire of '71 and by diligence and hard labor transformed this piece of land from the wilderness that it was in 1874 to the modern country home of the present day.

Florence McKinnon Gwinn, Pioneer History of Huron County Michigan (Huron County Pioneer and Historical Society, 1922), pgs. 75-76
