= White Rock, Michigan =

- Unincorporated community
- Location within the state of Michigan White Rock (the United States)
- Coordinates: 43°42′35″N 82°36′31″W
- Country: United States
- State: Michigan
- County: Huron
- Township: Sherman
- Elevation: 720 ft (220 m)
- Time zone: UTC-5 (Eastern (EST))
  - Summer (DST): UTC-4 (EDT)
- ZIP code(s): 48441 (Harbor Beach)
- Area code: 989
- FIPS code: 26-73160
- GNIS feature ID: 1616331

White Rock is an unincorporated community in Huron County in the U.S. state of Michigan. The community is located within Sherman Township. As an unincorporated community, White Rock has no legal autonomy, defined boundaries, or population statistics of its own. It is located at 43°42′35″N 82°36′31″W, about three miles north of Forestville and about nine miles south of Harbor Beach on M-25 at the junction with White Rock Road.

The community is named for a large white boulder offshore in Lake Huron at 43°43′09″N 82°36′16″W that was used as a boundary marker to define the territory ceded by Ottawa, Chippewa, Wyandot, and Potawatomi with the Treaty of Detroit in 1807. The boundary definition in the treaty began with the "mouth of the Miami river of the lakes" or what is now known as the Maumee River at Toledo, Ohio. From there the boundary ran up the middle of the river to the mouth of the Auglaize River at what is now Defiance, Ohio, then due north until it intersected a parallel of latitude at the outlet of Lake Huron into the St. Clair River. This north–south line would become the Michigan Meridian used in surveying of Michigan lands. The intersecting parallel of latitude crossed the meridian at the northeast corner of what is now Sciota Township in Shiawassee County in the middle of the border with Clinton County. From this point the treaty boundary ran northeast to White Rock in Lake Huron, then due east to the international boundary with what was then Upper Canada, and then along the international boundary through the St. Clair River, Lake St. Clair, the Detroit River and then into Lake Erie to a point due east of the mouth of the Maumee River, and finally west back to the point of beginning.

Edward Petit, the first white settler in Huron County, opened a trading post on nearby Shebeon Creek and later moved the post to White Rock. It is labelled as "White Rock City" on some early maps. By the mid-1830s, it was a thriving village and gained its own post office in 1859. The community was destroyed in the Great Fire of 1871 (also known as the Port Huron Fire of 1871, which destroyed huge swaths in several portions of the Lower Peninsula of Michigan, but was overshadowed by the Great Chicago Fire and Peshtigo Fire in Wisconsin which occurred on the same day). The town soon rebuilt, but never grew beyond a small community.

The Michigan Department of Transportation began construction of White Rock Roadside Park along M-25 in 2000. Completed in 2003, the small park has a parking lot, outhouses, a historical marker, picnic tables, scenic overlook and public access to the beach of Lake Huron. As of 8/12/2018 the scenic overlook stairs are closed permanently, as they have been removed for public safety.
