= Sheridan Township, Huron County, Michigan =

Sheridan Township, Michigan
- Civil township
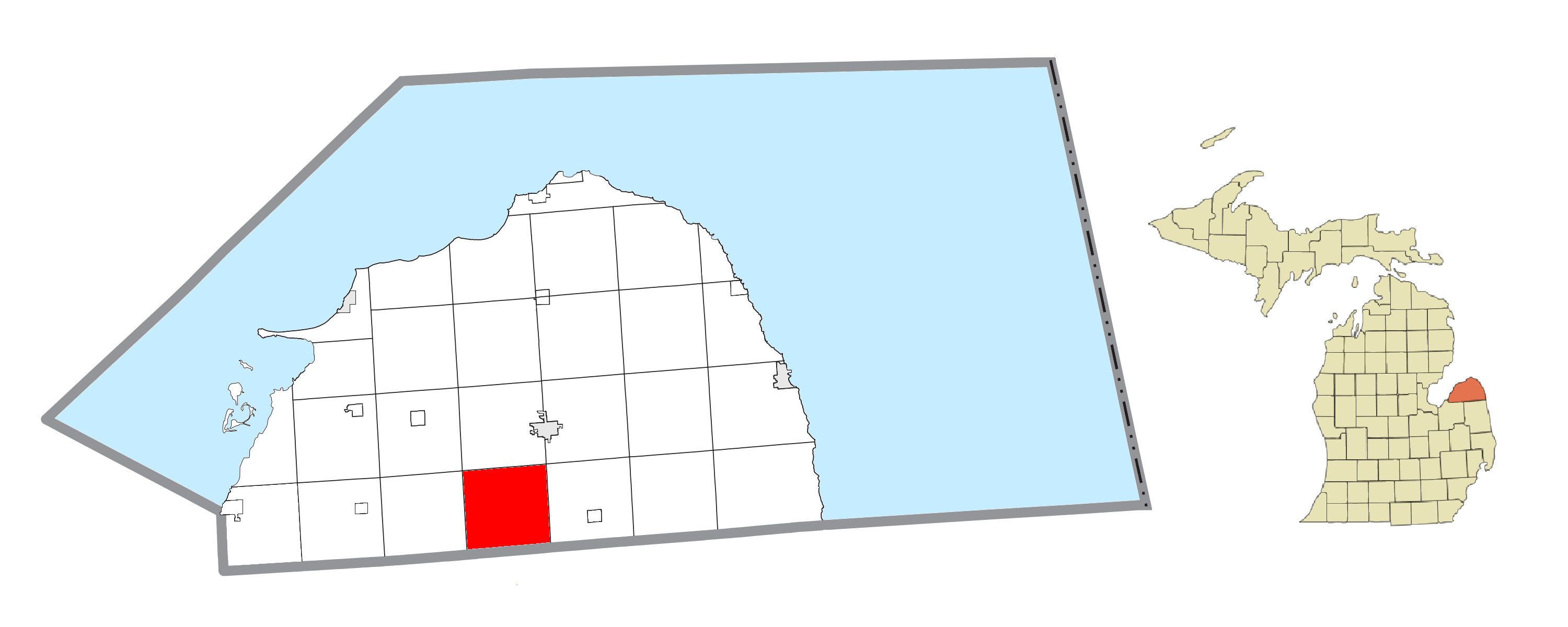
- Location within Huron County

- Location within the state of Michigan Sheridan Township (the United States)
- Coordinates: 43°42′54″N 83°04′10″W
- Country: United States
- State: Michigan
- County: Huron

Area
  - Total: 36.2 sq mi (93.7 km^{2})
  - Land: 36.2 sq mi (93.7 km^{2})
  - Water: 0 sq mi (0.0 km^{2})
- Elevation: 758 ft (231 m)

Population (2020)
  - Total: 627
  - Density: 17.3/sq mi (6.69/km^{2})
- Time zone: UTC-5 (Eastern (EST))
  - Summer (DST): UTC-4 (EDT)
- ZIP code(s): 48413, 48475
- Area code: 989
- FIPS code: 26-73040
- GNIS feature ID: 1627066

Sheridan Township is a civil township of Huron County in the U.S. state of Michigan. The population was 627 at the 2020 census.

== Communities ==
- Appin was a settlement founded by people from Scotland. It had a post office from 1894 until 1904.
- Ivanhoe is an unincorporated community in the Township on W. Atwater Road and M-53/S. Van Dyke Road 43°42′20″N 83°5′38″W with an elevation of 748 feet. President Nixon stopped in Ivanhoe during his trip up to Bad Axe in 1973.

== Geography ==
According to the United States Census Bureau, the township has a total area of 36.2 square miles (93.7 km^{2}), all land.

== Demographics ==
As of the census of 2000, there were 736 people, 257 households, and 200 families residing in the township. The population density was 20.3 per square mile (7.9/km^{2}). There were 279 housing units at an average density of 7.7 per square mile (3.0/km^{2}). The racial makeup of the township was 98.51% White, 0.41% Native American, 0.14% from other races, and 0.95% from two or more races. Hispanic or Latino of any race were 0.27% of the population.

There were 257 households, out of which 37.0% had children under the age of 18 living with them, 65.4% were married couples living together, 6.2% had a female householder with no husband present, and 21.8% were non-families. 19.1% of all households were made up of individuals, and 7.0% had someone living alone who was 65 years of age or older. The average household size was 2.82 and the average family size was 3.22.

In the township the population was spread out, with 28.7% under the age of 18, 7.1% from 18 to 24, 28.7% from 25 to 44, 23.4% from 45 to 64, and 12.2% who were 65 years of age or older. The median age was 36 years. For every 100 females, there were 98.9 males. For every 100 females age 18 and over, there were 104.3 males.

The median income for a household in the township was $39,850, and the median income for a family was $45,583. Males had a median income of $31,875 versus $22,054 for females. The per capita income for the township was $19,065. About 3.9% of families and 6.5% of the population were below the poverty line, including 7.1% of those under age 18 and none of those age 65 or over.
