= Huron County, Michigan =

County in Michigan, United States

- County
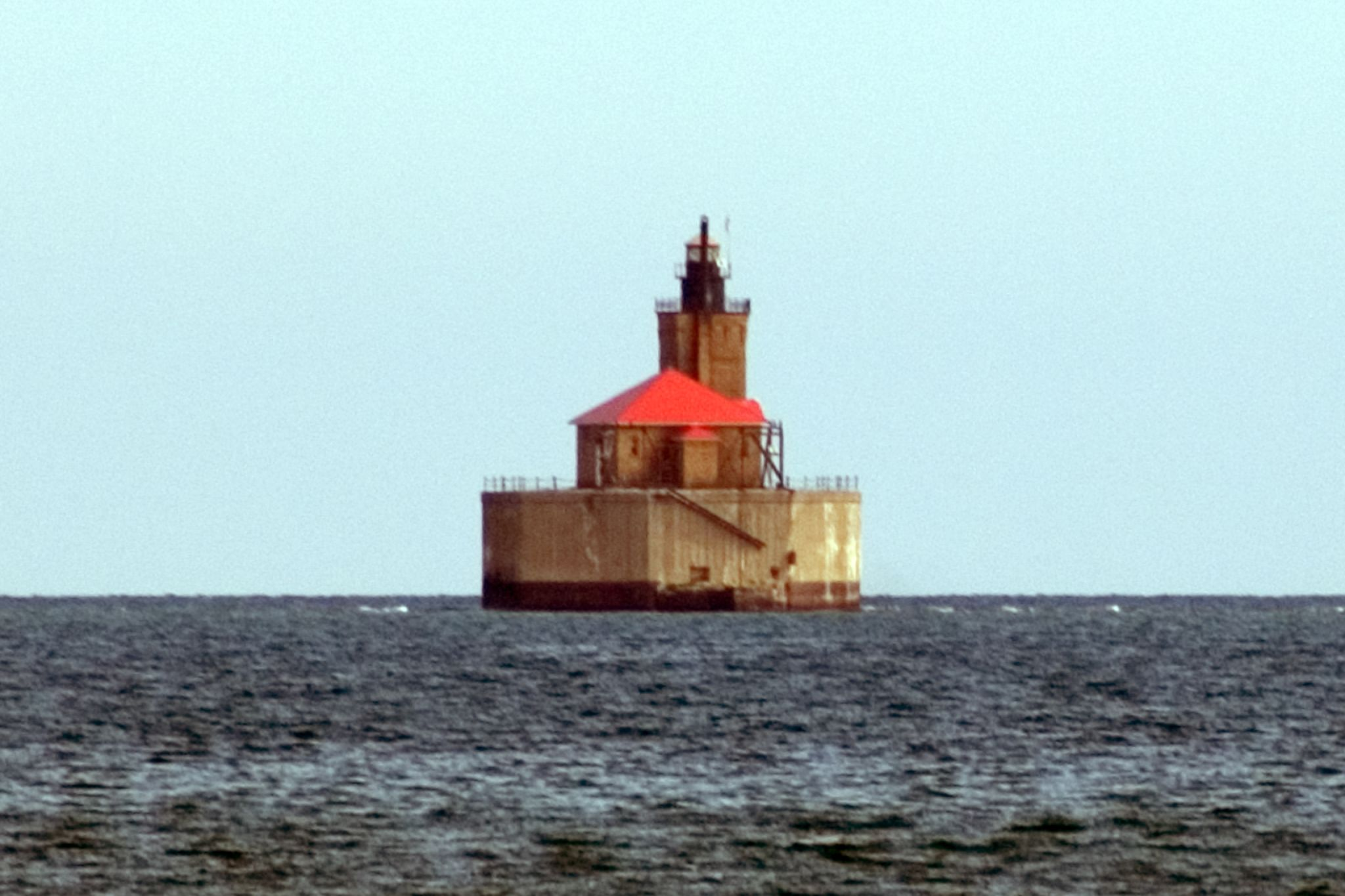
- Port Austin Light

- Location within the U.S. state of Michigan
- Coordinates: 43°52′N 83°02′W
- Country: United States
- State: Michigan
- Founded: April 1, 1840 (created); January 25, 1859 (organized)
- Named for: Lake Huron
- Seat: Bad Axe
- Largest city: Bad Axe

Area
  - Total: 2,137 sq mi (5,530 km^{2})
  - Land: 836 sq mi (2,170 km^{2})
  - Water: 1,301 sq mi (3,370 km^{2}) 61%

Population (2020)
  - Total: 31,407
  - Estimate (2025): 30,530 ▼
  - Density: 37.6/sq mi (14.5/km^{2})
- Time zone: UTC−5 (Eastern)
  - Summer (DST): UTC−4 (EDT)
- Congressional district: 9th
- Website: co.huron.mi.us

Huron County (/ˈhjʊərɒn, -ən/ HURE-on, -ən) is a county in the U.S. state of Michigan. As of the 2020 Census, the population was 31,407. The county seat is Bad Axe. Huron County is at the northern tip of the Thumb, which is a sub region of Mid Michigan. It is a peninsula, bordered by Saginaw Bay to the west and Lake Huron to the north and east, and has over 90 miles (140 km) of shoreline, from White Rock on Lake Huron to Sebewaing on the Saginaw Bay. Huron County's most prominent industry is agriculture, as with most of the other Thumb counties. Huron County enjoys seasonal tourism from large cities such as Detroit, Flint, and Saginaw. Much of the tourism is in the Port Austin and Caseville area.

== History ==
Huron County was originally attached to neighboring Sanilac and Tuscola counties. It was created by Michigan law on April 1, 1840, and was fully organized by an Act of Legislature on January 25, 1859. Sand Beach (now Harbor Beach) was the county seat until 1865, when the court house burned, destroying most of its records. The county seat was moved to Port Austin and remained there until 1873, when the county's Board of Supervisors designated Bad Axe as the county seat.

The name Huron was derived from the word "hures" as used in the phrase "În elles hures" (what heads) as applied by an astonished French traveler to the Wendat (Huron) Indians on beholding their mode of dressing the hair. During 1649 and the Beaver Wars of the mid-17th century, the Iroquois from the areas of New York and Pennsylvania drove out the Wendat, in order to control the fur trade.

In the 17th and early 18th century in this region, the Thumb of Michigan, the Wyandot suffix "onti" or "ondi" was used in place names such as Skenchioetontius and E. Kandechiondius. "Onti" means to "jut out". The name Wyandotte, Huron descendants, was said to mean "dwellers of the peninsula". A headland or peninsula in Onondaga, an Iroquoian language, is "onoentoto".

In the early 18th century, the Thumb of Michigan was said to have the best beaver hunting in America. The Detroit region was called Tio-sahr-ondion, "where it is beaver dams athwart many". This was near Skenchioe [now Huron and Sanilac counties].

About 1700, French maps indicated the region of Saginaw and the Thumb of Michigan as "Chasse des caster des amis de François", "the beaver hunting grounds of the friends of Francis."

== Geography ==
According to the U.S. Census Bureau, the county has a total area of 2,137 square miles (5,530 km^{2}), of which 836 square miles (2,170 km^{2}) is land and 1,301 square miles (3,370 km^{2}) (61%) is water.

Huron county is heavily agricultural. The county is generally flat, with some rolling hills.

=== Adjacent counties ===
By land

- Sanilac County (southeast)
- Tuscola County (southwest)

By water

- Arenac County (northwest)
- Iosco County (northwest)

=== Highways ===
- M-19 - runs north and south through the southern half of the county
- M-25 - runs along the outer edge of the county, along the shore of Lake Huron and Saginaw Bay
- M-53 - runs north and south through the central part of the county
- M-142 - runs east and west through the central part of the county

== Demographics ==
Historical population
Census	Pop.	Note	%±
1850	210		—
1860	3,165		1,407.1%
1870	9,049		185.9%
1880	20,089		122.0%
1890	28,545		42.1%
1900	34,162		19.7%
1910	34,758		1.7%
1920	32,768		−5.7%
1930	31,132		−5.0%
1940	32,584		4.7%
1950	33,149		1.7%
1960	34,006		2.6%
1970	34,083		0.2%
1980	36,459		7.0%
1990	34,951		−4.1%
2000	36,079		3.2%
2010	33,118		−8.2%
2020	31,407		−5.2%
2025 (est.)	30,530	▼	−2.8%
US Decennial Census; 1790-1960 1900-1990; 1990-2000 2010-2018

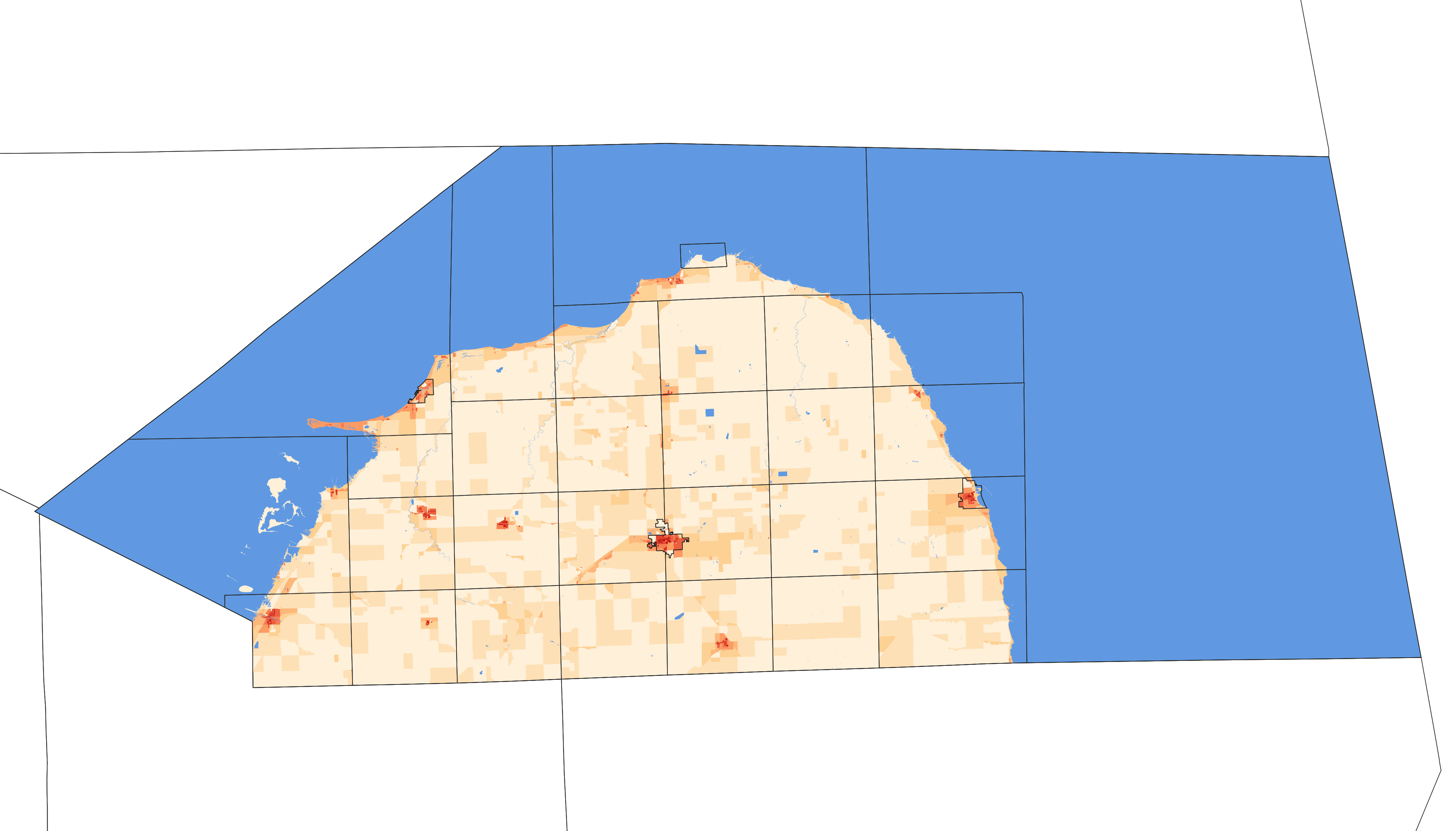
2020 population density of Huron County MI by census block

=== Racial and ethnic composition ===
Huron County, Michigan – Racial and ethnic composition Note: the US Census treats Hispanic/Latino as an ethnic category. This table excludes Latinos from the racial categories and assigns them to a separate category. Hispanics/Latinos may be of any race.
Race / Ethnicity (NH = Non-Hispanic)	Pop 1980	Pop 1990	Pop 2000	Pop 2010	Pop 2020	% 1980	% 1990	% 2000	% 2010	% 2020
White alone (NH)	35,873	34,405	34,923	31,830	29,508	98.39%	98.44%	96.80%	96.11%	93.95%
Black or African American alone (NH)	25	20	69	121	77	0.07%	0.06%	0.19%	0.37%	0.25%
Native American or Alaska Native alone (NH)	78	88	95	100	77	0.21%	0.25%	0.26%	0.30%	0.25%
Asian alone (NH)	56	58	126	148	150	0.15%	0.17%	0.35%	0.45%	0.48%
Native Hawaiian or Pacific Islander alone (NH)	x	x	3	4	5	x	x	0.01%	0.01%	0.02%
Other race alone (NH)	31	8	9	5	42	0.09%	0.02%	0.02%	0.02%	0.13%
Mixed race or Multiracial (NH)	x	x	263	253	708	x	x	0.73%	0.76%	2.25%
Hispanic or Latino (any race)	396	372	591	657	840	1.09%	1.06%	1.64%	1.98%	2.67%
Total	36,459	34,951	36,079	33,118	31,407	100.00%	100.00%	100.00%	100.00%	100.00%

=== 2020 census ===
As of the 2020 census, the county had a population of 31,407 and a median age of 49.6 years. 19.0% of residents were under the age of 18 and 26.2% of residents were 65 years of age or older. For every 100 females there were 99.0 males, and for every 100 females age 18 and over there were 98.9 males.

The racial makeup of the county was 94.9% White, 0.3% Black or African American, 0.3% American Indian and Alaska Native, 0.5% Asian, <0.1% Native Hawaiian and Pacific Islander, 0.9% from some other race, and 3.1% from two or more races. Hispanic or Latino residents of any race comprised 2.7% of the population.

<0.1% of residents lived in urban areas, while 100.0% lived in rural areas.

There were 14,048 households in the county, of which 22.0% had children under the age of 18 living in them. Of all households, 48.5% were married-couple households, 20.5% were households with a male householder and no spouse or partner present, and 24.6% were households with a female householder and no spouse or partner present. About 33.0% of all households were made up of individuals and 17.2% had someone living alone who was 65 years of age or older.

There were 20,319 housing units, of which 30.9% were vacant. Among occupied housing units, 80.9% were owner-occupied and 19.1% were renter-occupied. The homeowner vacancy rate was 1.6% and the rental vacancy rate was 9.2%.

=== 2010 census ===
The 2010 United States census indicates Huron County had a 2010 population of 33,118. This decrease of -2,961 people from the 2000 United States census represents an 8.2% decrease. In 2010 there were 14,348 households and 9,328 families in the county. The population density was 39.6 per square mile (15.3/km^{2}). There were 21,199 housing units at an average density of 25.4 per square mile (9.8/km^{2}). 97.5% of the population were White, 0.4% Asian, 0.4% Black or African American, 0.3% Native American, 0.4% of some other race and 0.9% of two or more races. 2.0% were Hispanic or Latino (of any race). 41.1% were of German, 15.9% Polish, 6.8% Irish, 6.1% English and 6.0% American ancestry.

There were 14,348 households, out of which 24.7% had children under the age of 18 living with them, 52.7% were husband and wife families, 8.1% had a female householder with no husband present, 35.0% were non-families, and 30.7% were made up of individuals. The average household size was 2.27 and the average family size was 2.81.

In the county, the population was spread out, with 20.7% under age of 18, 6.4% from 18 to 24, 20.4% from 25 to 44, 30.8% from 45 to 64, and 21.7% who were 65 years of age or older. The median age was 47 years. For every 100 females there were 98.5 males. For every 100 females age 18 and over, there were 97.3 males.

The 2010 American Community Survey 3-year estimate indicates the median income for a household in the county was $38,789 and the median income for a family was $46,533. Males had a median income of $26,688 versus $15,198 for females. The per capita income for the county was $21,342. About 1.4% of families and 14.4% of the population were below the poverty line, including 19.7% of those under the age 18 and 10.4% of those age 65 or over.

=== Religion ===
- The United Methodist Church was historically strong in the Thumb region but has declined in recent decades with closure of several congregations and withdrawal of others to the Global Methodist Church. The Free Methodist, Nazarene, Wesleyan and Missionary Church denominations are also represented and have a Methodist heritage and belief system.
- The Roman Catholic Diocese of Saginaw is the controlling regional body for the Catholic Church.
- All Episcopal parishes are members of the Episcopal Diocese of Eastern Michigan
- The Church of Jesus Christ of Latter-day Saints has one meetinghouse in Huron County.

== Government ==
The county government operates the jail, maintains rural roads, operates the major local courts, records deeds, mortgages, and vital records, administers public health regulations, and participates with the state in the provision of social services. The county board of commissioners controls the budget and has limited authority to make laws or ordinances. In Michigan, most local government functions — police and fire, building and zoning, tax assessment, street maintenance, etc. — are the responsibility of individual cities and townships.

=== Elected officials ===
- Prosecuting Attorney: Timothy J. Rutkowski
- Sheriff: Kelly J. Hanson
- County Clerk: Lori S. Neal
- County Treasurer: Deb McCollum
- Register of Deeds: Sarah Durr
- Circuit Court Judge: Hon. M. Gerald M. Prill
- Probate Court Judge: Hon. David L. Clabuesch
- District Court Judge: Hon. David B. Herrington
- Commissioner Dist 1: Sami Khoury (R)
- Commissioner Dist 2: Michael Meissner (R)
- Commissioner Dist 3: Todd Talaski (R)
- Commissioner Dist 4: Steve Vaughan (R)
- Commissioner Dist 5: John L. Bodis (R)
- Commissioner Dist 6: Joe Murphy (R)
- Commissioner Dist 7: Mary Ellen Babcock (R)

as of 2018

== Politics ==
Huron County voters have generally supported Republican Party candidates. Since 1884, they have selected the Republican Party nominee in 81% of national elections (29 of 36).

United States presidential election results for Huron County, Michigan
Year	Republican		Democratic		Third party(ies)	
Year	No.	%	No.	%	No.	%
1884	1,355	39.48%	1,898	55.30%	179	5.22%
1888	1,608	34.51%	1,988	42.67%	1,063	22.82%
1892	1,692	35.35%	2,222	46.42%	873	18.24%
1896	3,396	53.64%	2,808	44.35%	127	2.01%
1900	3,632	60.57%	2,120	35.36%	244	4.07%
1904	4,191	71.09%	1,486	25.21%	218	3.70%
1908	3,565	67.66%	1,477	28.03%	227	4.31%
1912	1,813	28.61%	1,236	19.50%	3,288	51.89%
1916	4,743	70.85%	1,816	27.13%	135	2.02%
1920	8,354	82.57%	1,581	15.63%	182	1.80%
1924	8,843	81.14%	988	9.07%	1,067	9.79%
1928	7,046	64.79%	3,797	34.91%	32	0.29%
1932	5,707	48.82%	5,770	49.36%	213	1.82%
1936	5,240	46.76%	3,949	35.24%	2,018	18.01%
1940	10,570	79.73%	2,654	20.02%	34	0.26%
1944	9,538	80.16%	2,301	19.34%	59	0.50%
1948	7,978	74.92%	2,562	24.06%	108	1.01%
1952	10,639	81.28%	2,421	18.50%	29	0.22%
1956	10,493	76.57%	3,192	23.29%	19	0.14%
1960	9,592	62.34%	5,775	37.53%	19	0.12%
1964	6,263	45.96%	7,349	53.93%	14	0.10%
1968	8,743	64.51%	3,607	26.62%	1,202	8.87%
1972	9,832	67.36%	4,456	30.53%	308	2.11%
1976	9,297	61.26%	5,721	37.70%	158	1.04%
1980	10,553	65.27%	4,434	27.43%	1,180	7.30%
1984	11,073	73.37%	3,966	26.28%	52	0.34%
1988	9,419	61.91%	5,714	37.56%	81	0.53%
1992	6,491	39.03%	6,023	36.21%	4,118	24.76%
1996	6,126	41.24%	6,827	45.96%	1,902	12.80%
2000	8,911	55.37%	6,899	42.86%	285	1.77%
2004	9,671	55.37%	7,629	43.68%	166	0.95%
2008	8,434	49.22%	8,367	48.83%	334	1.95%
2012	8,806	56.87%	6,518	42.10%	160	1.03%
2016	10,692	67.06%	4,579	28.72%	673	4.22%
2020	12,731	69.03%	5,490	29.77%	221	1.20%
2024	13,224	69.71%	5,522	29.11%	223	1.18%

United States Senate election results for Huron County, Michigan1
Year	Republican		Democratic		Third party(ies)	
Year	No.	%	No.	%	No.	%
2024	12,509	67.43%	5,541	29.87%	500	2.70%

Michigan Gubernatorial election results for Huron County
Year	Republican		Democratic		Third party(ies)	
Year	No.	%	No.	%	No.	%
2022	9,395	62.52%	5,310	35.34%	322	2.14%

== Parks and recreation ==
Tourism is important to Huron County with bay front and lakefront towns such as Sebewaing, Caseville, Port Austin, Port Hope, and Harbor Beach, attracting tourists from all over. Huron County borders the Saginaw Bay and Lake Huron. There are two state parks – Sleeper State Park and Port Crescent State Park – and three roadside parks – Jenks Park, Brown Park, and White Rock Park. Huron County also maintains eight county parks along the shoreline – Caseville Park, Lighthouse Park, Stafford Park, McGraw Park, Philp Park, Wagener Park, Oak Beach Park, and Sebewaing Park.

== Communities ==
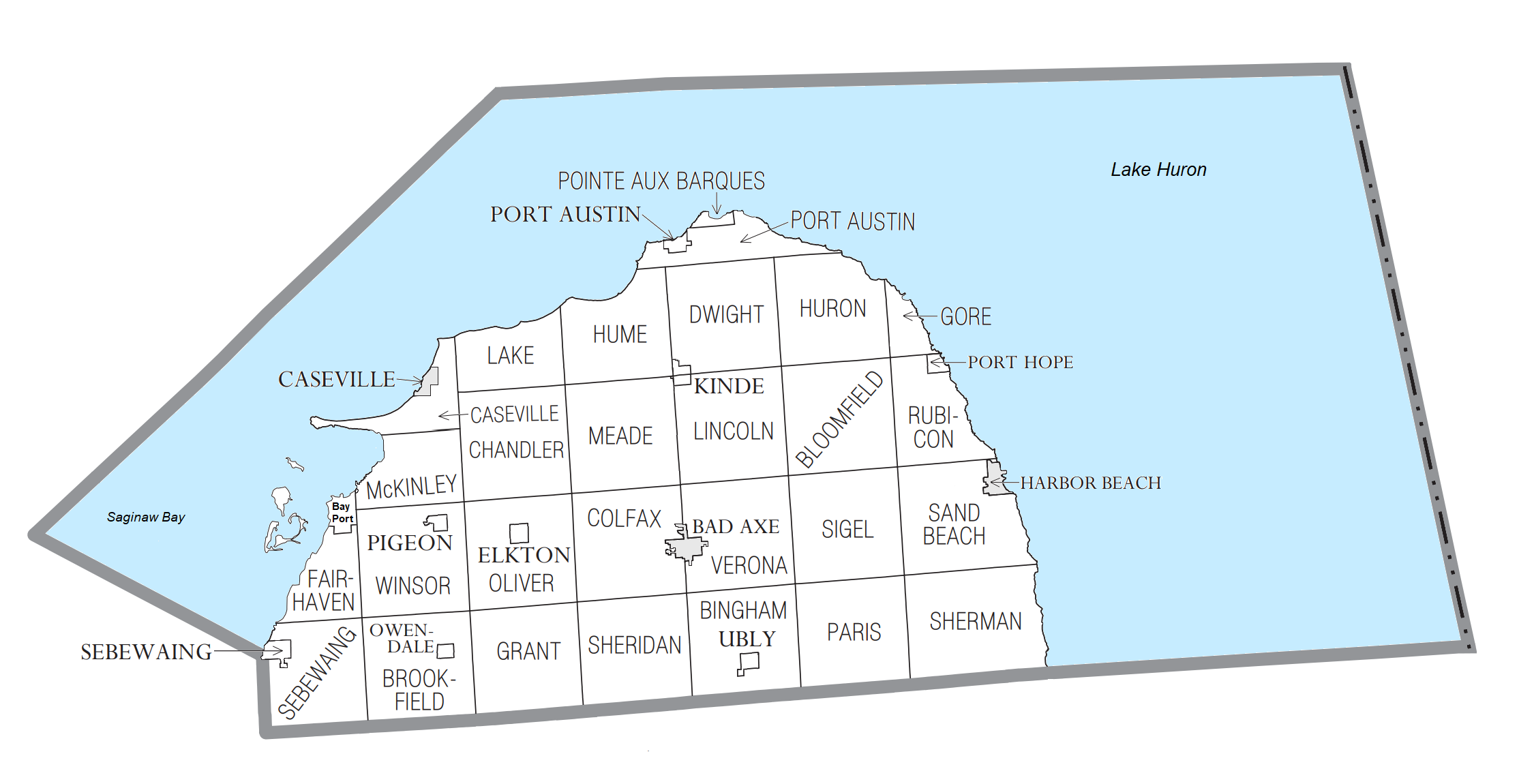
U.S. Census data map showing local municipal boundaries within Huron County, as well as the CDP of Bay Port. Shaded areas represent incorporated cities.

=== Cities ===
- Bad Axe (county seat)
- Caseville
- Harbor Beach

=== Villages ===
- Elkton
- Kinde
- Owendale
- Pigeon
- Port Austin
- Port Hope
- Sebewaing
- Ubly

=== Civil townships ===
- Bingham Township
- Bloomfield Township
- Brookfield Township
- Caseville Township
- Chandler Township
- Colfax Township
- Dwight Township
- Fairhaven Township
- Gore Township
- Grant Township
- Hume Township
- Huron Township
- Lake Township
- Lincoln Township
- McKinley Township
- Meade Township
- Oliver Township
- Paris Township
- Pointe Aux Barques Township
- Port Austin Township
- Rubicon Township
- Sand Beach Township
- Sebewaing Township
- Sheridan Township
- Sherman Township
- Sigel Township
- Verona Township
- Winsor Township

=== Census-designated place ===
- Bay Port

=== Other unincorporated communities ===
- Bach
- Berne
- Cracow
- Filion
- Glencoe
- Grindstone City
- Helena
- Huron City
- Ivanhoe
- Kilmanagh
- Lewisville
- Linkville
- Parisville
- Pawlowski
- Pinnebog
- Pointe aux Barques
- Popple
- Rapson
- Redman
- Rose Island
- Ruth
- Valley Island
- Verona
- Weale
- White Rock

== See also ==
- List of Michigan State Historic Sites in Huron County
- National Register of Historic Places listings in Huron County, Michigan
