= Rapson, Michigan =

- Unincorporated community
- Location within the state of Michigan Rapson (the United States)
- Coordinates: 43°51′22″N 82°52′57″W
- Country: United States
- State: Michigan
- County: Huron
- Townships: Bloomfield, Lincoln, Verona, and Sigel
- Elevation: 728 ft (222 m)
- Time zone: UTC-5 (Eastern (EST))
  - Summer (DST): UTC-4 (EDT)
- ZIP code(s): 48413
- Area code: 989
- GNIS feature ID: 635653

Rapson is an unincorporated community in Huron County in the U.S. state of Michigan, located in what is popularly called the Thumb portion of the Lower Peninsula. It is situated at the corners where four townships meet at Rapson and Verona Roads: Bloomfield on the northeast, Sigel on the southeast, Verona on the southwest, and Lincoln on the northwest.

== Education ==
Rapson was home to a one-room school house for 96 years. Officially known as Bloomfield Township District No. 7 Frl., students could attend from kindergarten through 8th grade. In its heyday, Rapson School had as many as 50 students. It closed in 2008 when enrollment dropped to just one student.

== Church ==
St. Joseph's Catholic Church is the only church located in Rapson. The priest in residence also served Mass at Most Holy Trinity Catholic Church located 7 miles to the south in Smith Corners. Most Holy Trinity Catholic Church merged with St Joseph's Catholic Church and Sacred Heart Catholic Church (located in Bad Axe, MI) Forming St. Hubert's Parish. Most Holy Trinity is no longer in operation as a Catholic church. St. Joseph's rectory was torn down in 2018, after nearly ten years of vacancy.

== Social ==
While Rapson was once home to 'The Grainery' bar, the building was then occupied by the Bad Axe Moose Lodge #2358. The Moose Lodge has since closed.

== Media ==
Rapson is served by a daily newspaper, the Huron Daily Tribune, and two commercial radio stations owned by Thumb Broadcasting, WLEW-AM/FM. WLEW-AM 1340 plays country music, and WLEW-FM, known as "Cruise 102.1," features an adult hits/classic hits format.
