= Treaty of Detroit =

1807 treaty between the United States and Native Americans

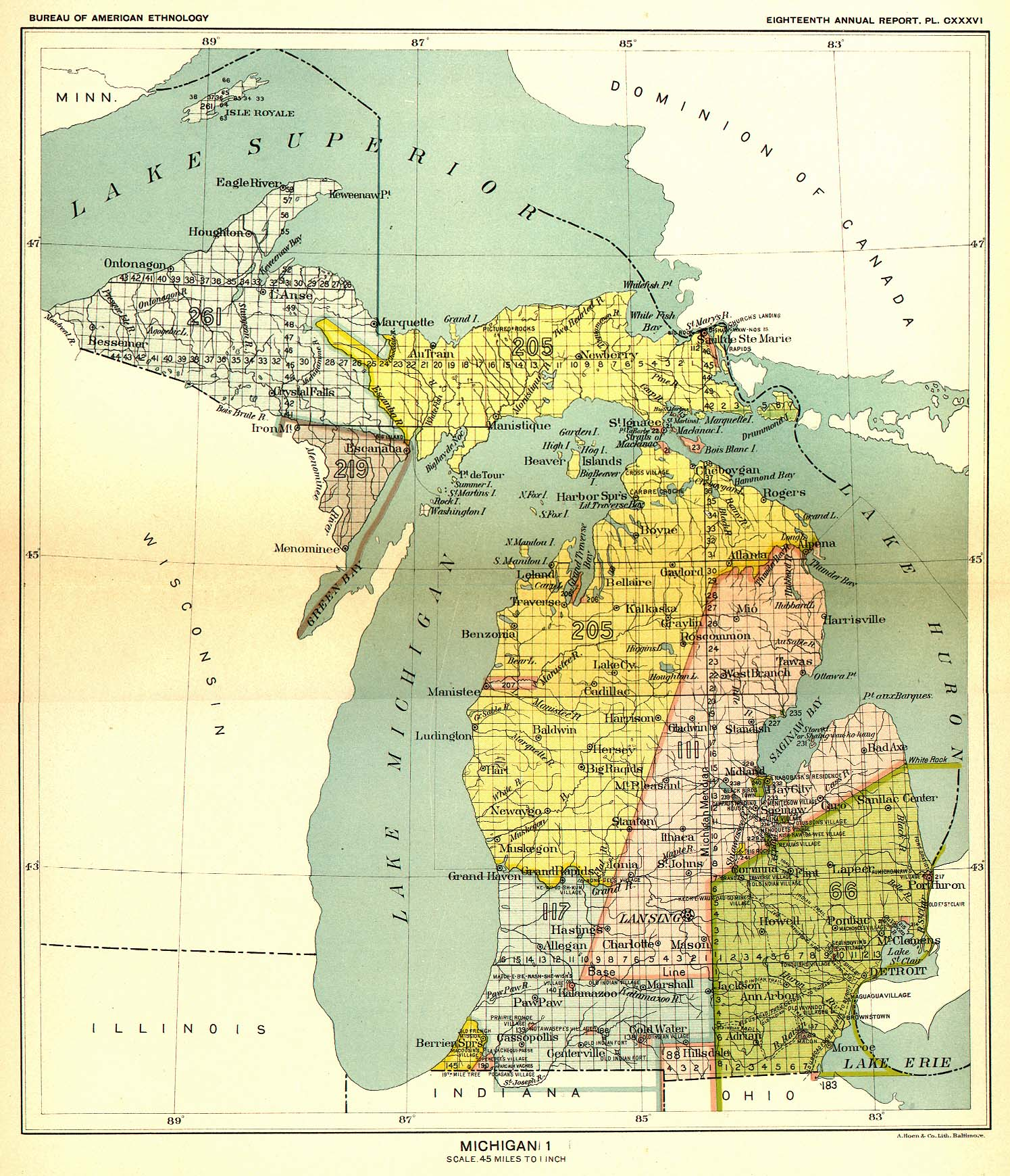
The 1807 Treaty of Detroit ceded the olive-colored area in southeast Michigan.

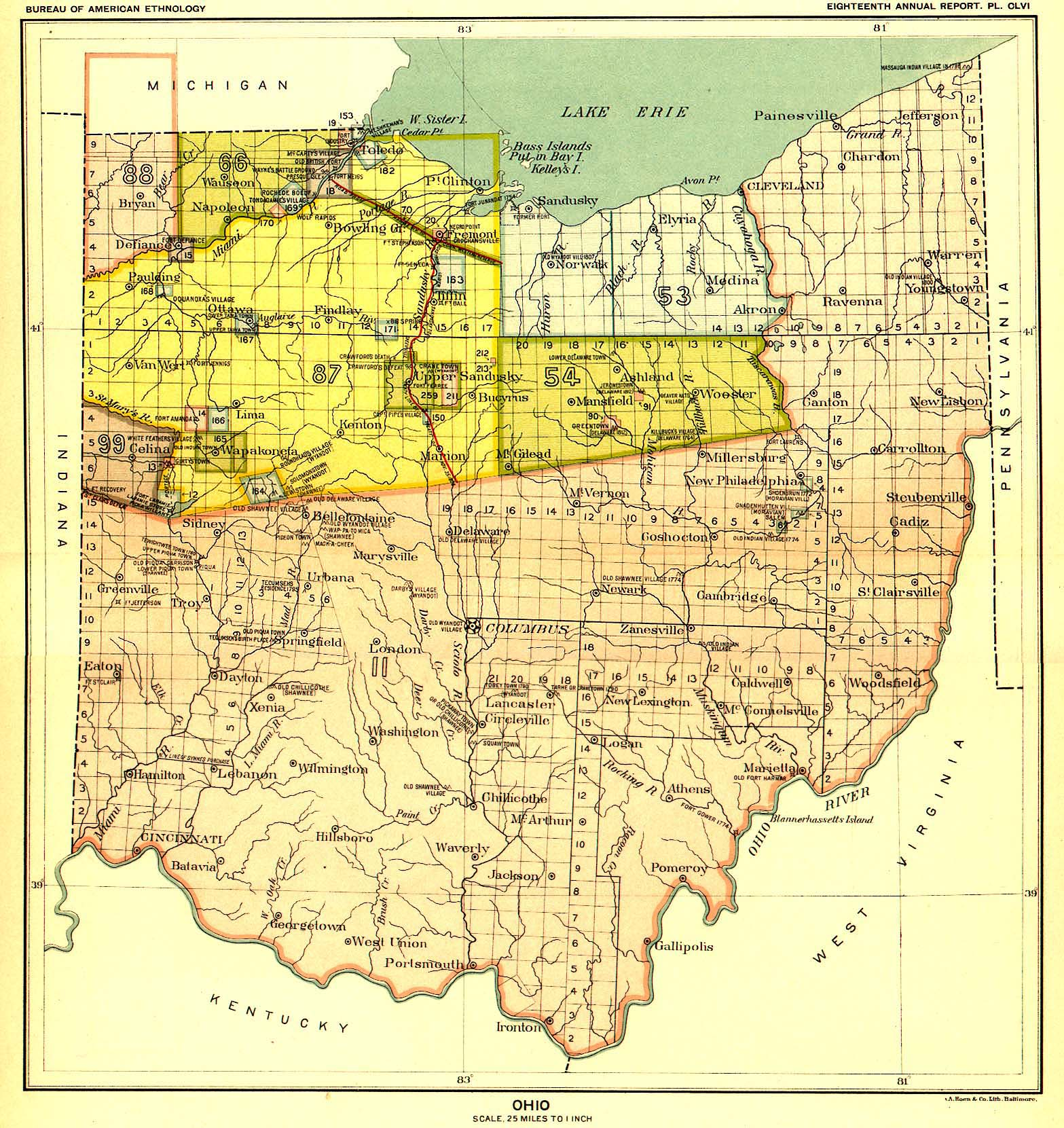
The treaty also ceded the dark yellow area north of the Maumee River in northwest Ohio.

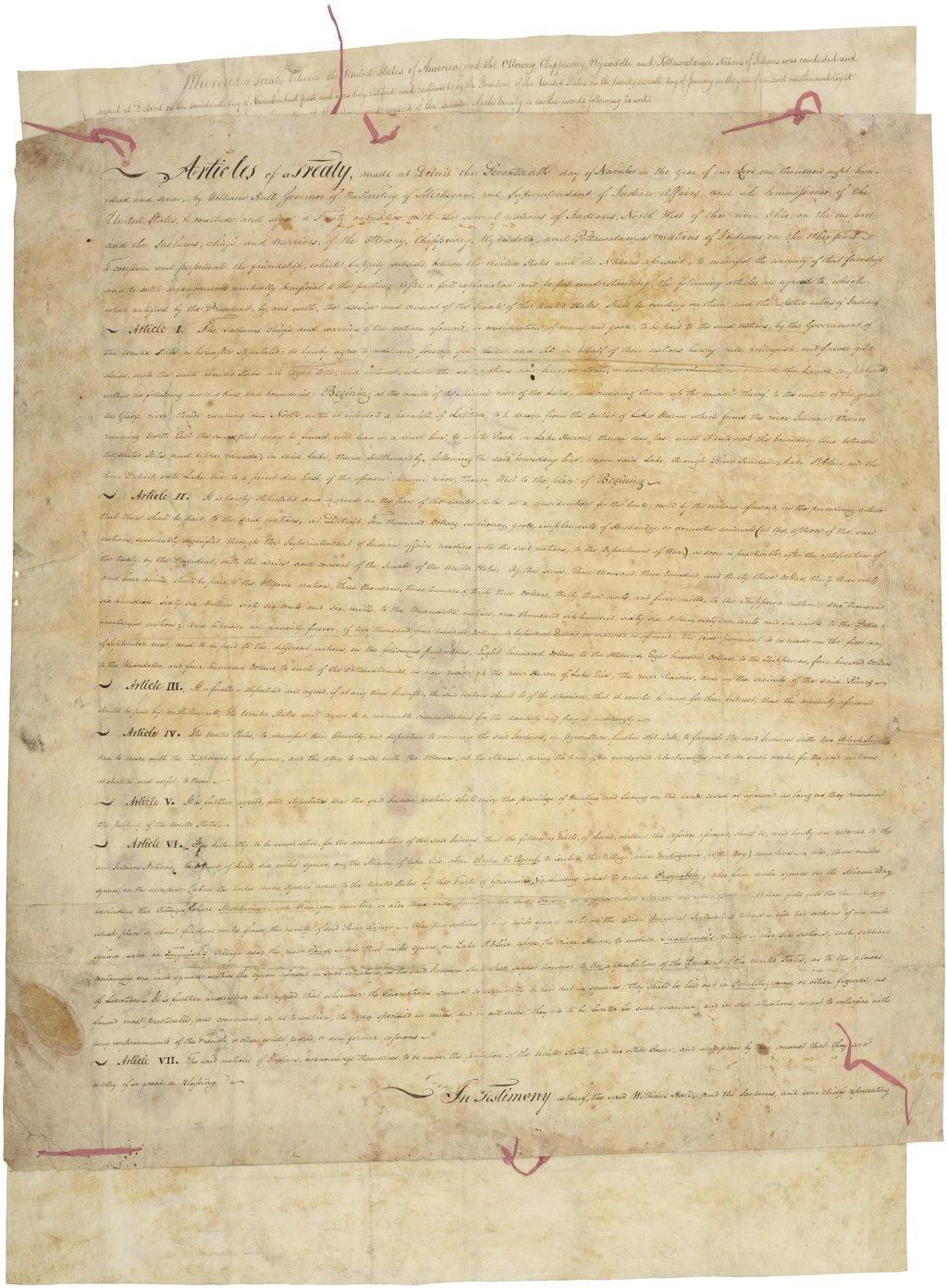
Treaty of Detroit (1807), National Archives and Records Administration.

The Treaty of Detroit was a treaty between the United States and the Ottawa, Chippewa, Wyandot, and Potawatomi Native American nations. The treaty was signed in Detroit, Michigan on November 17, 1807, with William Hull, governor of the Michigan Territory and superintendent of Indian affairs, the sole representative of the U.S.

With this treaty, these Native American tribes ceded claim to a large portion of land in what is now Southeast Michigan and northwest Ohio. The boundary definition in the treaty began with the "mouth of the Miami river of the lakes," or what is now known as the Maumee River at Toledo, Ohio. From there the boundary ran up the middle of the river to the mouth of its tributary Auglaize River at what is now Defiance, Ohio, then due north until it intersected a parallel of latitude at the outlet of Lake Huron into the St. Clair River.

This north-south line would become the Michigan Meridian used in the surveying of Michigan lands. The intersecting parallel of latitude crossed the meridian at the northwest corner of what is now Sciota Township in Shiawassee County in the middle of the border with Clinton County. From this point the treaty boundary ran northeast to White Rock in Lake Huron, then due east to the international boundary with what was then Upper Canada, and then along the international boundary through the St. Clair River, Lake St. Clair, the Detroit River and then into Lake Erie to a point due east of the mouth of the Maumee River, and finally west back to the point of beginning.

== See also ==
- Indian Removals in Ohio
- List of Indian Treaties
