= Shepherd, Michigan =

- Village
- Village of Shepherd
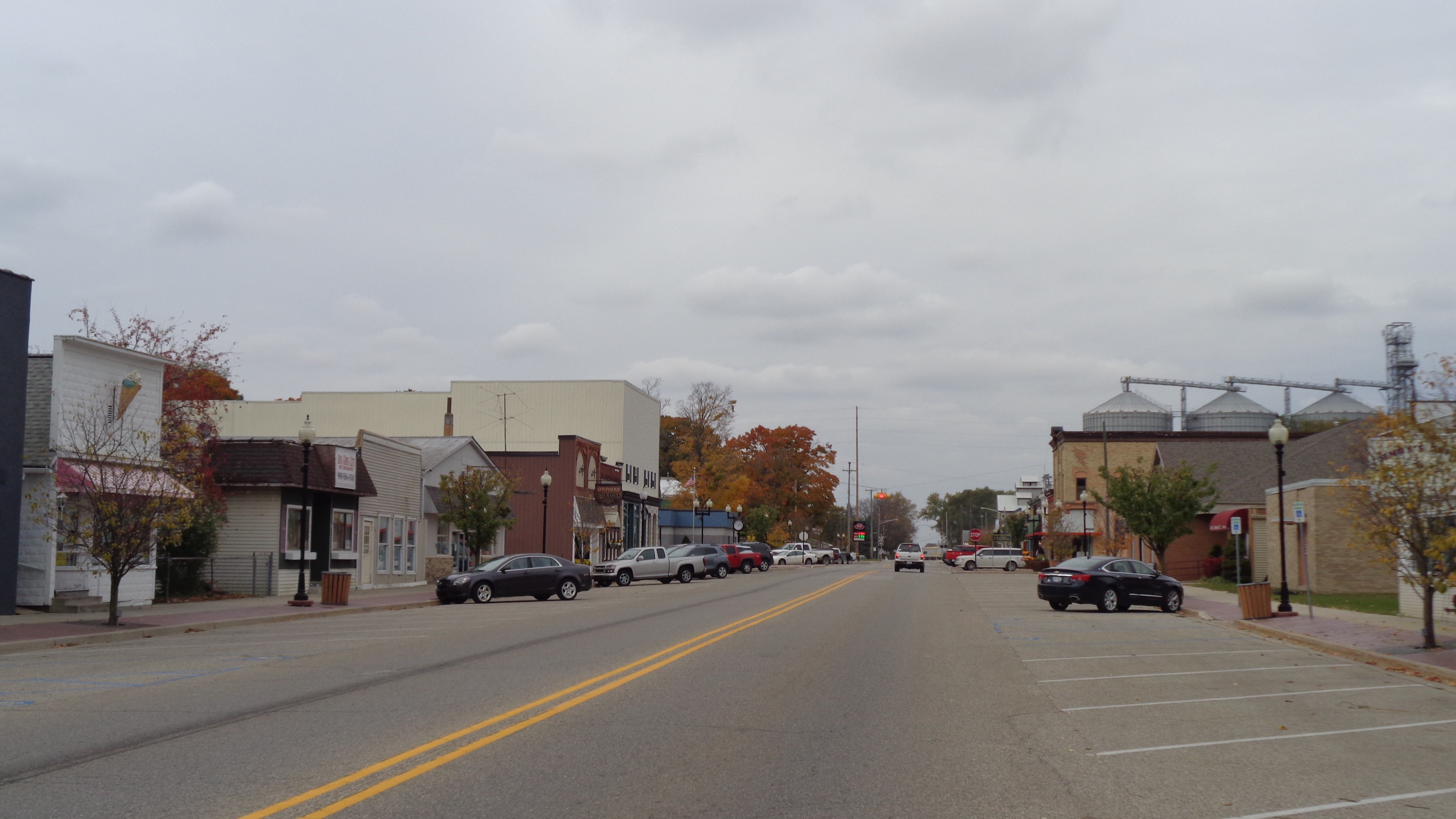
- Looking west along W. Wright Avenue

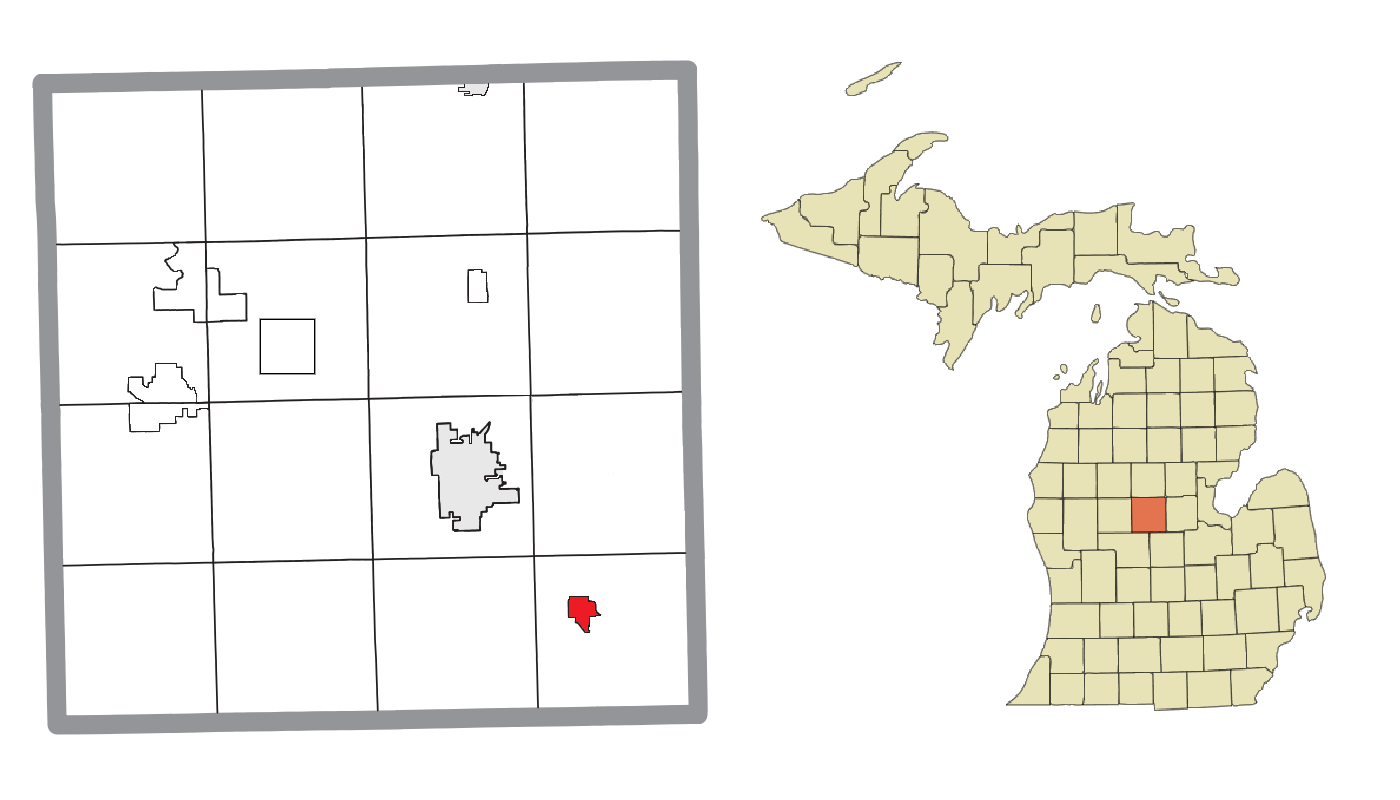
- Location within Isabella County

- Location within the state of Michigan Location within the United States
- Coordinates: 43°31′28″N 84°41′41″W
- Country: United States
- State: Michigan
- County: Isabella
- Township: Coe
- Established: 1857
- Platted: 1866
- Incorporated: 1889

Government
  - Type: Village council
  - President: Mike Degraw
  - Clerk: Gina Gross

Area
  - Total: 0.96 sq mi (2.49 km^{2})
  - Land: 0.96 sq mi (2.49 km^{2})
  - Water: 0 sq mi (0.00 km^{2})
- Elevation: 774 ft (236 m)

Population (2020)
  - Total: 1,469
  - Density: 1,534.7/sq mi (592.56/km^{2})
- Time zone: UTC-5 (Eastern (EST))
  - Summer (DST): UTC-4 (EDT)
- ZIP code(s): 48883
- Area code: 989
- FIPS code: 26-72960
- GNIS feature ID: 0637740
- Website: Official website

Shepherd is a village in Isabella County in the U.S. state of Michigan. The population was 1,469 at the 2020 census. The village is located within Coe Township.

== History ==
The community was first settled by lumberman Isaac Shepherd and others along the Salt River. It was given a post office named Salt River on August 8, 1857, and formally platted in 1866. By 1885, the railroads expanded into the area, and Salt River received a station named Shepherd, as it was located on Isaac Shepherd's estate. The name of the post office was changed to Shepherd on March 8, 1887. That same year, most of the community was destroyed by a fire but soon rebuilt and incorporated as a village in 1889.

In 1958, the village began hosting the annual Shepherd Maple Syrup Festival, which has grown to includes many exhibits, crafts, music, food, and a parade.

== Geography ==
According to the U.S. Census Bureau, the village has a total area of 0.96 square miles (2.49 km^{2}), all land.

=== Major highways ===
- US 127 runs south–north just east of the village boundaries and is accessible via exit 135 (Blanchard Road).

=== Climate ===
This climatic region is typified by large seasonal temperature differences, with warm to hot (and often humid) summers and cold (sometimes severely cold) winters. According to the Köppen Climate Classification system, Shepherd has a humid continental climate, abbreviated "Dfb" on climate maps.

== Demographics ==
Historical population
Census	Pop.	Note	%±
1890	469		—
1900	635		35.4%
1910	835		31.5%
1920	823		−1.4%
1930	839		1.9%
1940	852		1.5%
1950	899		5.5%
1960	1,293		43.8%
1970	1,416		9.5%
1980	1,534		8.3%
1990	1,413		−7.9%
2000	1,536		8.7%
2010	1,515		−1.4%
2020	1,469		−3.0%
U.S. Decennial Census

=== 2010 census ===
As of the census of 2010, there were 1,515 people, 640 households, and 412 families living in the village. The population density was 1,561.9 inhabitants per square mile (603.1/km^{2}). There were 699 housing units at an average density of 720.6 per square mile (278.2/km^{2}). The racial makeup of the village was 94.2% White, 0.5% African American, 1.3% Native American, 0.3% Asian, 0.9% from other races, and 2.8% from two or more races. Hispanic or Latino of any race were 3.2% of the population.

There were 640 households, of which 31.7% had children under the age of 18 living with them, 43.3% were married couples living together, 14.7% had a female householder with no husband present, 6.4% had a male householder with no wife present, and 35.6% were non-families. 30.8% of all households were made up of individuals, and 11.4% had someone living alone who was 65 years of age or older. The average household size was 2.36 and the average family size was 2.92.

The median age in the village was 37.5 years. 24.5% of residents were under the age of 18; 9% were between the ages of 18 and 24; 25.7% were from 25 to 44; 27.8% were from 45 to 64; and 13% were 65 years of age or older. The gender makeup of the village was 46.7% male and 53.3% female.

=== 2000 census ===
As of the census of 2000, there were 1,536 people, 619 households, and 417 families living in the village. The population density was 1,586.7 inhabitants per square mile (612.6/km^{2}). There were 641 housing units at an average density of 662.2 per square mile (255.7/km^{2}). The racial makeup of the village was 96.35% White, 0.46% African American, 0.52% Native American, 0.33% Asian, 0.65% from other races, and 1.69% from two or more races. Hispanic or Latino of any race were 2.34% of the population.

There were 619 households, out of which 36.0% had children under the age of 18 living with them, 49.9% were married couples living together, 13.1% had a female householder with no husband present, and 32.5% were non-families. 29.6% of all households were made up of individuals, and 9.7% had someone living alone who was 65 years of age or older. The average household size was 2.47 and the average family size was 3.07.

In the village, the population was spread out, with 27.5% under the age of 18, 10.9% from 18 to 24, 30.3% from 25 to 44, 19.5% from 45 to 64, and 11.7% who were 65 years of age or older. The median age was 34 years. For every 100 females, there were 89.6 males. For every 100 females age 18 and over, there were 82.5 males.

The median income for a household in the village was $40,804, and the median income for a family was $49,135. Males had a median income of $33,011 versus $21,950 for females. The per capita income for the village was $17,689. About 9.2% of families and 10.5% of the population were below the poverty line, including 14.7% of those under age 18 and 4.7% of those age 65 or over.

== Notable people ==
- Len Kasper, radio announcer for the Chicago White Sox, grew up in Shepherd

== Images ==
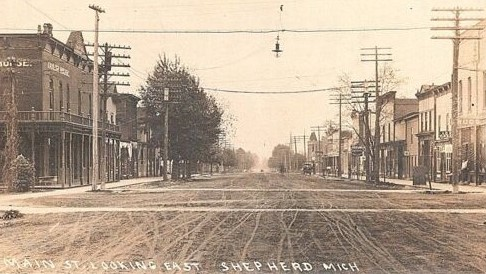
Historic image of Main Street (1911)

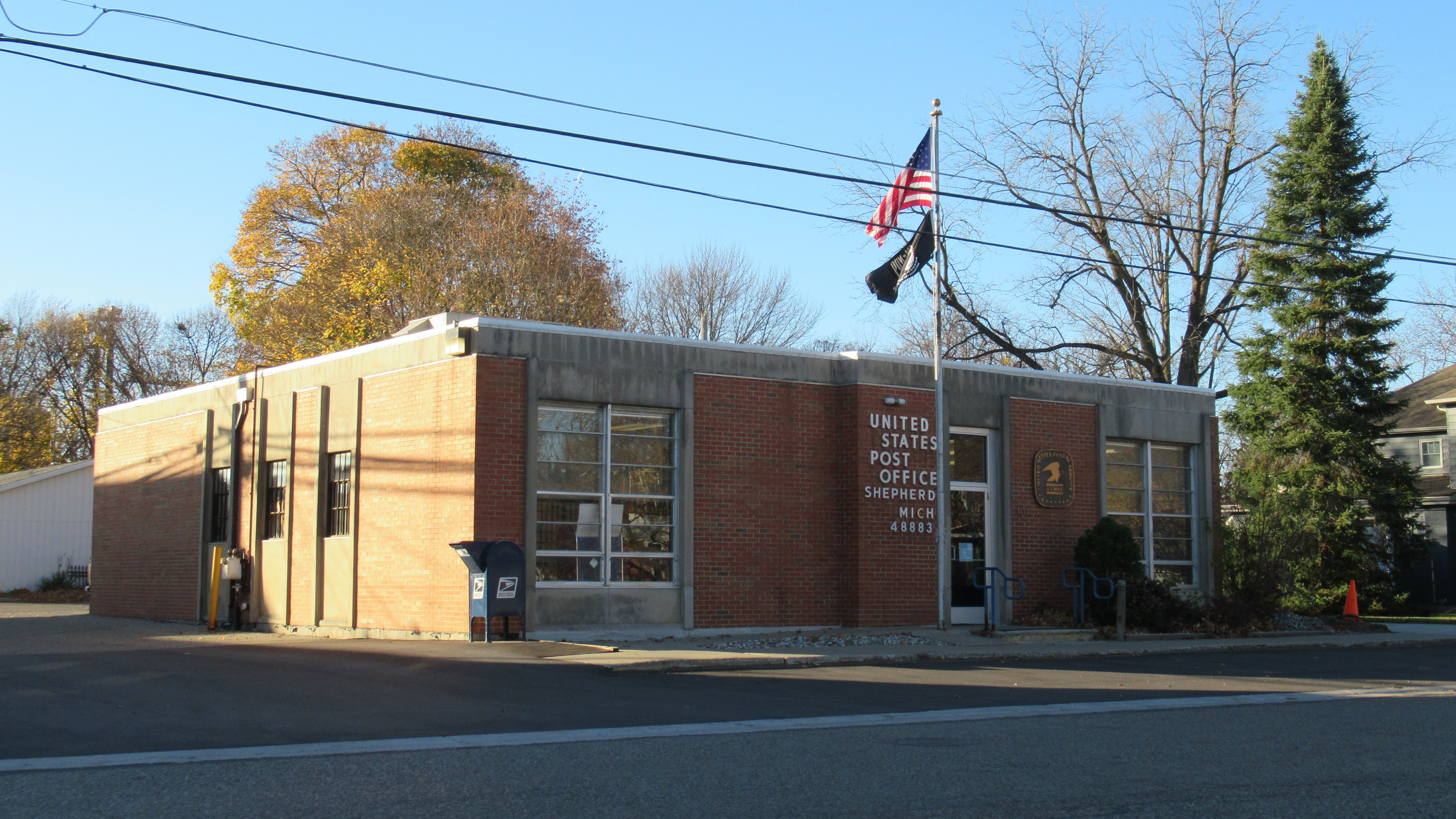
U.S. Post Office in Shepherd

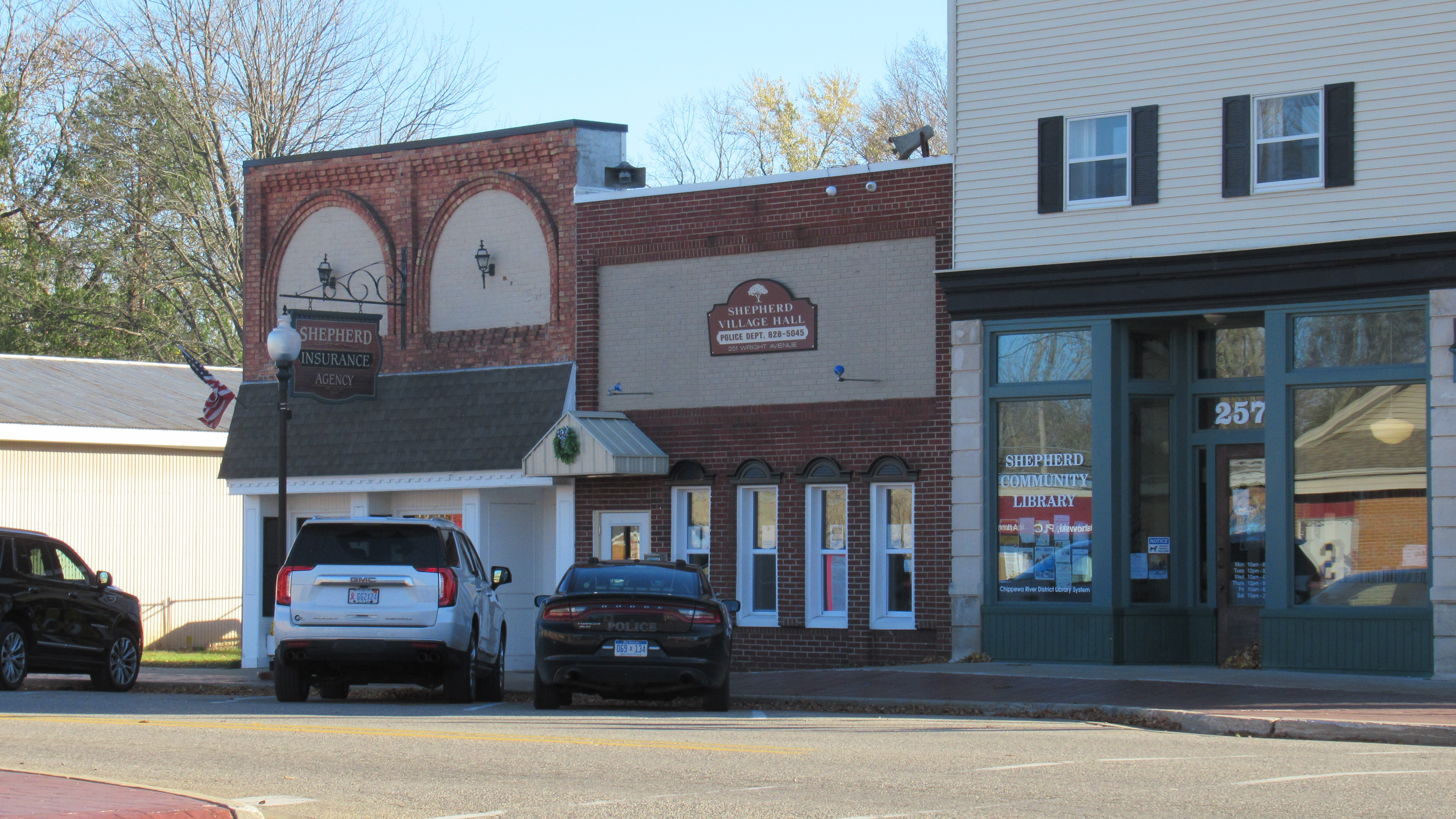
Village Hall / Police and Library
