= Paris Township, Michigan =

- Civil township
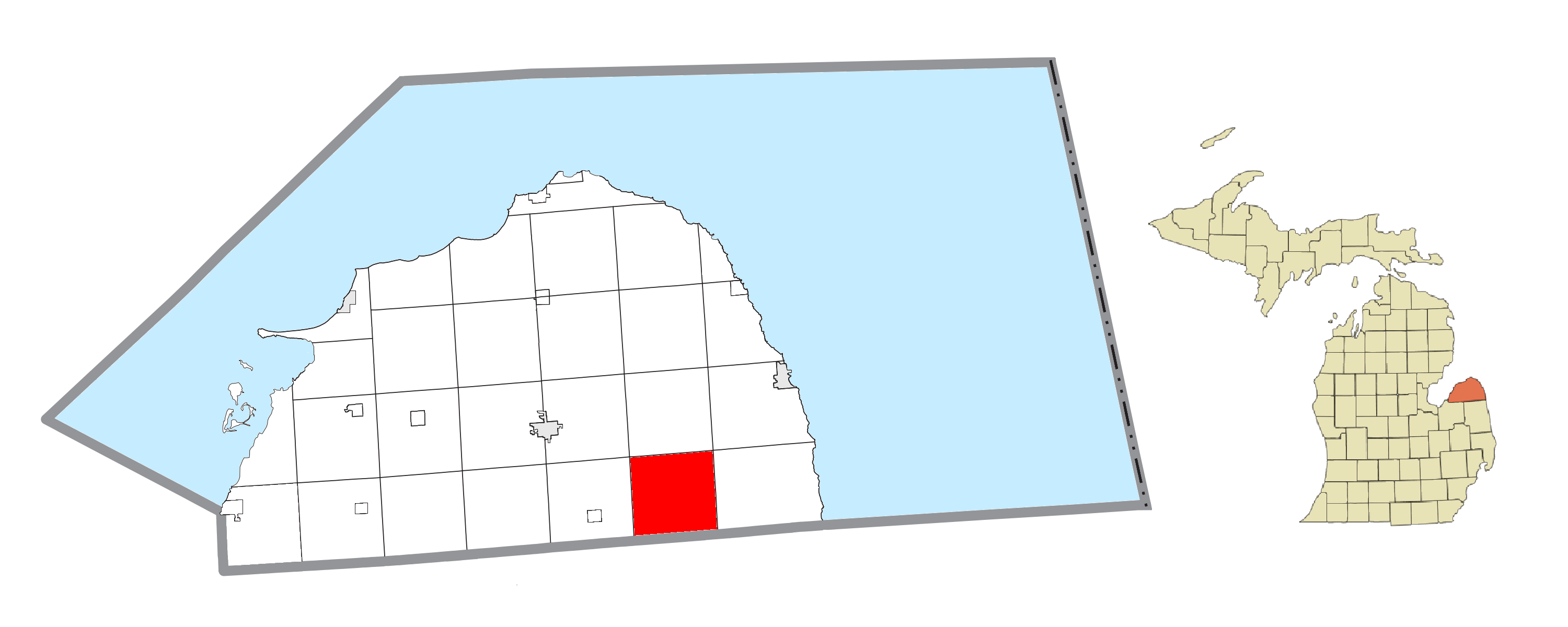
- Location within Huron County

- Location within the state of Michigan Paris Township (the United States)
- Coordinates: 43°44′07″N 82°48′26″W
- Country: United States
- State: Michigan
- County: Huron
- Established: 1839

Area
  - Total: 36.1 sq mi (93.6 km^{2})
  - Land: 36.1 sq mi (93.6 km^{2})
  - Water: 0 sq mi (0.0 km^{2})
- Elevation: 797 ft (243 m)

Population (2020)
  - Total: 491
  - Density: 13.6/sq mi (5.25/km^{2})
- Time zone: UTC-5 (Eastern (EST))
  - Summer (DST): UTC-4 (EDT)
- ZIP code(s): 48413, 48456, 48470, 48475
- Area code: 989
- FIPS code: 26-62360
- GNIS feature ID: 1626881
- Website: https://www.paristwpmi.gov/

Paris Township is a civil township of Huron County in the U.S. state of Michigan. The population was 491 at the 2020 census.

== History ==
Paris Township was established in 1839.

== Communities ==
- Cracow is an unincorporated community at Priemer and Polk roads in the township. Founded in 1862 by Polish settlers who named it after the Polish city. On June 8, 1869, a post office was opened with Frank Buchkowski as its first postmaster. The post office was closed on April 10, 1987.
- Crosby is an unincorporated community in the township. It had a post office starting in 1870 and was first named Bowen Station.
- Parisville, an unincorporated community formed in 1856, is one of the oldest Polish American settlements in the United States. It, and its township, Paris Township, are named after Paris, Ontario where many of the Poles lived, before moving to the "thumb" of Michigan.
- Pawlowski is an unincorporated community at Priemer and Parisville roads in the township.

== Geography ==
According to the United States Census Bureau, the township has a total area of 36.1 square miles (93 km^{2}), all land.

== Demographics ==
As of the census of 2000, there were 557 people, 204 households, and 138 families residing in the township. The population density was 15.4 per square mile (6.0/km^{2}). There were 230 housing units at an average density of 6.4 per square mile (2.5/km^{2}). The racial makeup of the township was 98.03% White, 0.18% Native American, and 1.80% from two or more races. Hispanic or Latino of any race were 1.26% of the population.

There were 204 households, out of which 35.3% had children under the age of 18 living with them, 59.8% were married couples living together, 3.9% had a female householder with no husband present, and 31.9% were non-families. 29.9% of all households were made up of individuals, and 15.7% had someone living alone who was 65 years of age or older. The average household size was 2.73 and the average family size was 3.45.

In the township the population was spread out, with 33.2% under the age of 18, 4.7% from 18 to 24, 27.3% from 25 to 44, 19.9% from 45 to 64, and 14.9% who were 65 years of age or older. The median age was 36 years. For every 100 females, there were 98.2 males. For every 100 females age 18 and over, there were 106.7 males.

The median income for a household in the township was $32,321, and the median income for a family was $41,364. Males had a median income of $29,500 versus $19,643 for females. The per capita income for the township was $14,714. About 9.9% of families and 13.8% of the population were below the poverty line, including 18.3% of those under age 18 and 18.3% of those age 65 or over.
