= Sand Beach Township, Michigan =

- Civil township
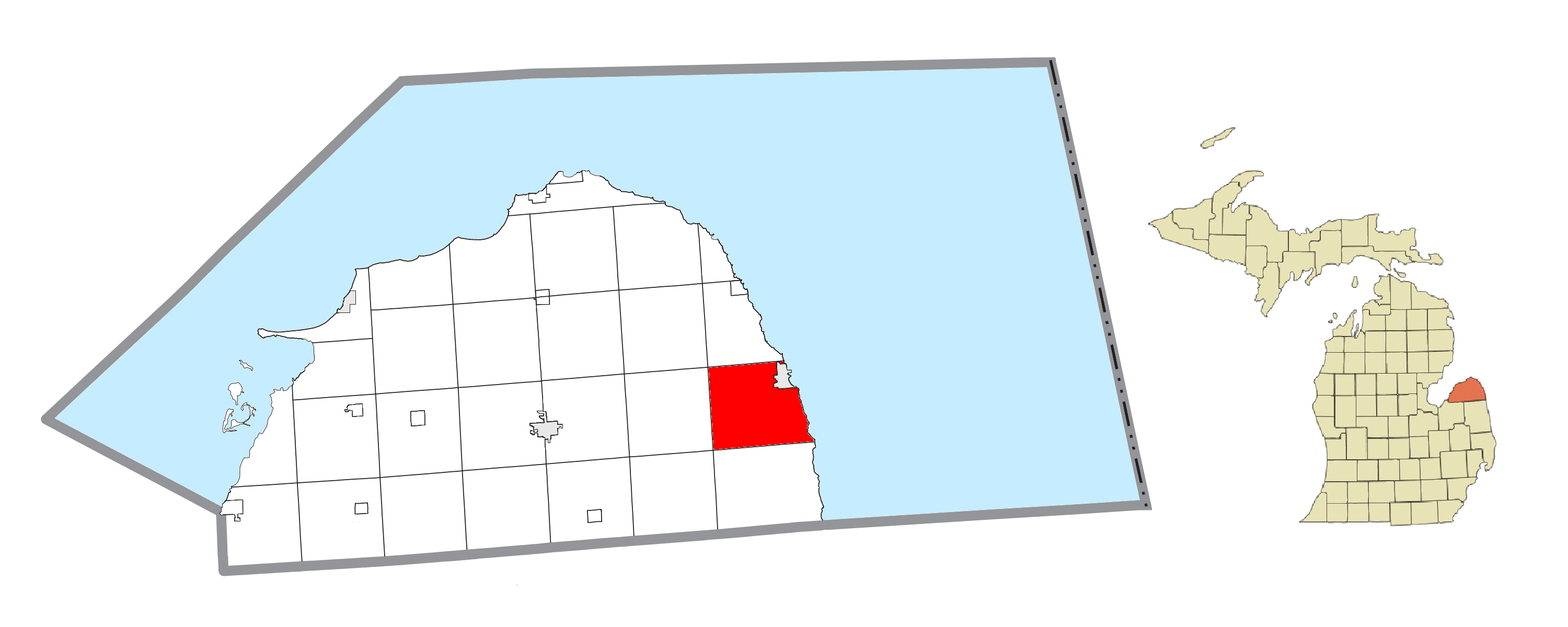
- Location within Huron County

- Location within the state of Michigan Sand Beach Township (the United States)
- Coordinates: 43°49′20″N 82°40′24″W
- Country: United States
- State: Michigan
- County: Huron

Area
  - Total: 36.6 sq mi (94.9 km^{2})
  - Land: 36.4 sq mi (94.3 km^{2})
  - Water: 0.23 sq mi (0.6 km^{2})
- Elevation: 699 ft (213 m)

Population (2020)
  - Total: 1,155
  - Density: 31.7/sq mi (12.2/km^{2})
- Time zone: UTC-5 (Eastern (EST))
  - Summer (DST): UTC-4 (EDT)
- ZIP code(s): 48441
- Area code: 989
- FIPS code: 26-71260
- GNIS feature ID: 1627039

Sand Beach Township is a civil township of Huron County in the U.S. state of Michigan. The population was 1,155 at the 2020 census.

The city of Harbor Beach is mostly surrounded by the township but is administered autonomously.

== Communities ==
- Helena is an unincorporated community on the border with Sherman Township on Helena Road between Buhl and Klug roads at 43°46′29″N 82°41′27″W.

== Geography ==
According to the United States Census Bureau, the township has a total area of 36.6 square miles (95 km^{2}), of which 36.4 square miles (94 km^{2}) is land and 0.2 square miles (0.52 km^{2}) (0.63%) is water.

== Demographics ==
As of the census of 2000, there were 1,470 people, 562 households, and 405 families residing in the township. The population density was 40.4 inhabitants per square mile (15.6/km^{2}). There were 750 housing units at an average density of 20.6 per square mile (8.0/km^{2}). The racial makeup of the township was 97.76% White, 0.34% Native American, 0.61% Asian, 0.61% from other races, and 0.68% from two or more races. Hispanic or Latino of any race were 1.29% of the population.

There were 562 households, out of which 32.2% had children under the age of 18 living with them, 65.3% were married couples living together, 4.4% had a female householder with no husband present, and 27.9% were non-families. 26.5% of all households were made up of individuals, and 16.9% had someone living alone who was 65 years of age or older. The average household size was 2.61 and the average family size was 3.18.

In the township the population was spread out, with 28.0% under the age of 18, 6.3% from 18 to 24, 23.4% from 25 to 44, 22.3% from 45 to 64, and 20.0% who were 65 years of age or older. The median age was 40 years. For every 100 females, there were 105.0 males. For every 100 females age 18 and over, there were 96.7 males.

The median income for a household in the township was $38,250, and the median income for a family was $43,750. Males had a median income of $35,625 versus $20,083 for females. The per capita income for the township was $17,476. About 3.7% of families and 6.2% of the population were below the poverty line, including 5.6% of those under age 18 and 9.8% of those age 65 or over.

== See also ==
- List of townships in Michigan
