= Parisville, Michigan =

- Unincorporated community
- Location within the state of Michigan Parisville (the United States)
- Coordinates: 43°42′50″N 82°47′59″W
- Country: United States
- State: Michigan
- County: Huron
- Township: Paris
- Settled: 1856
- Elevation: 794 ft (242 m)
- Time zone: UTC-5 (Eastern (EST))
  - Summer (DST): UTC-4 (EDT)
- ZIP code(s): 48456
- Area code: 989
- GNIS feature ID: 1617770

Parisville is an unincorporated community in Paris Township of Huron County in the U.S. state of Michigan. It is located about seven miles east of Ubly at 43°42′50.05″N 82°47′58.8″W.

Parisville is notable as one of the first Polish American settlements in the United States, having arrived around 1848. Parisville was named after Paris, Ontario by early settlers who lived in the Canadian town for a short period before moving on to the United States. Once a thriving community with numerous businesses, Parisville is now a quiet community of around 2 dozen homes and St. Mary's Catholic Church.
