= Pinnebog River =

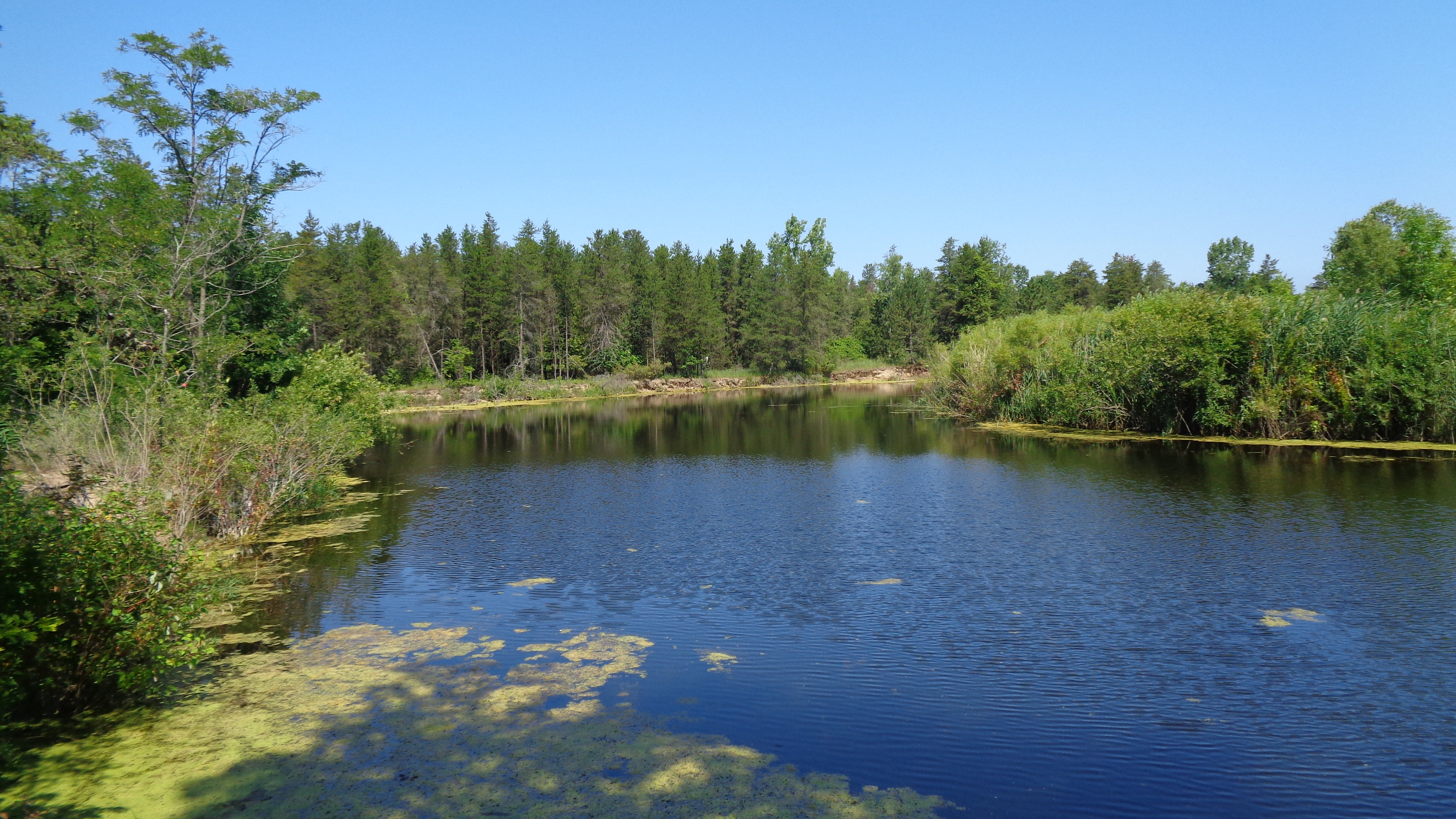
- The river within Port Crescent State Park

- Location within the state of Michigan

Physical characteristics
- Source
  - location: Colfax Township, Michigan
  - coordinates: 43°50′22″N 83°05′58″W
- Mouth: Lake Huron
  - location: Hume Township, Michigan
  - coordinates: 44°00′21″N 83°03′39″W
  - elevation: 577 ft (176 m)
- Length: 39.4 mi (63.4 km)

The Pinnebog River is a 39.4-mile-long (63.4 km) river in the Thumb region of the U.S. state of Michigan. The river flows into Lake Huron on the west side of the "tip" of the "thumb".

The entire length of the Pinnebog lies within Huron County and is fed by various agricultural ditches and drains. It is formed by the confluence of the Colona and Colfax drains near the southern boundary of section 28 in Colfax Township, on the south side of M-53 (Van Dyke Rd.) about 4 miles (6 km) south-southwest of Bad Axe. It flows southwest for about 2 miles (3 km) around the unincorporated community of Popple where it is fed by the Cameron and McLean drains. It then bends northward around Popple and flows northwest for about 5 miles (8 km) past the east side of the village of Elkton. North of Elkton, the river flows mostly northward to its mouth in Lake Huron in Port Crescent State Park at 44°00′23″N 83°03′39″W, about 4 miles (6 km) southwest of Port Austin. Other tributaries include the Elkton Drain, Nettle Run, Hill Drain, Southworth Drain, McMullen Drain, Oliver Drain, Bad Axe Creek, Musselman Drain (which empties Rush Lake in the Rush Lake State Game Area. Before reaching Lake Huron, it turns to flow east-northeast for about 3 miles (5 km) to its mouth. Just before its mouth, it is joined by the Taft and Schram drains.

The river's watershed drains all or portions of the following townships: Bingham, Chandler, Colfax, Dwight, Hume, Lake, Lincoln, Meade, Oliver, Sheridan, and Verona.

The unincorporated community of Pinnebog is situated on the Taft Drain. The Pinnebog River passes about 1 mile (1.6 km) to the west. Pinnebog Road runs from 2 miles (3 km) north of Pinnebog due south about 13 miles (21 km) to Van Dyke Road just north of Popple.

== See also ==
- List of rivers of Michigan
