= Bad Axe, Michigan =

- City
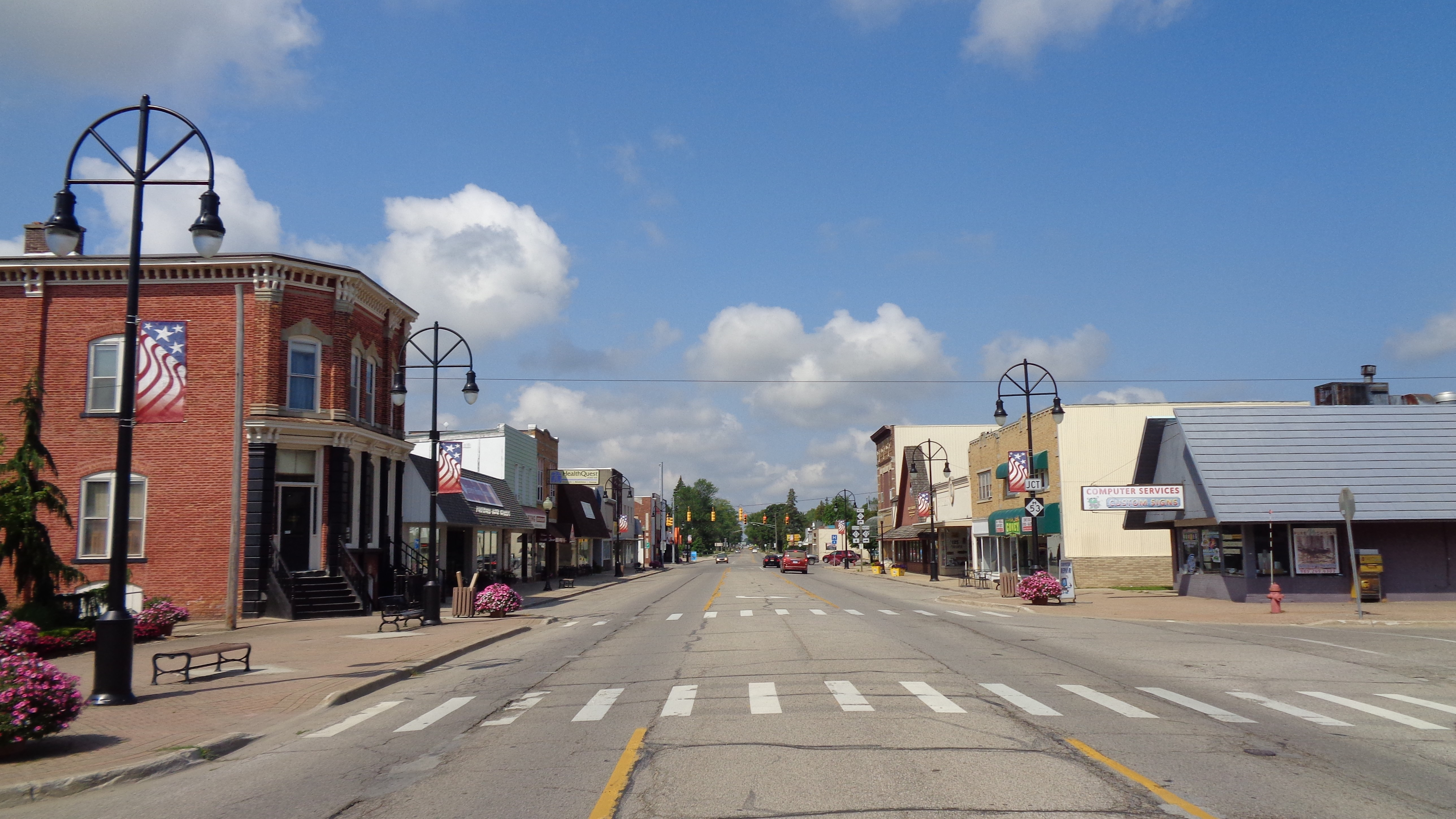
- Looking west along M-142 toward M-53

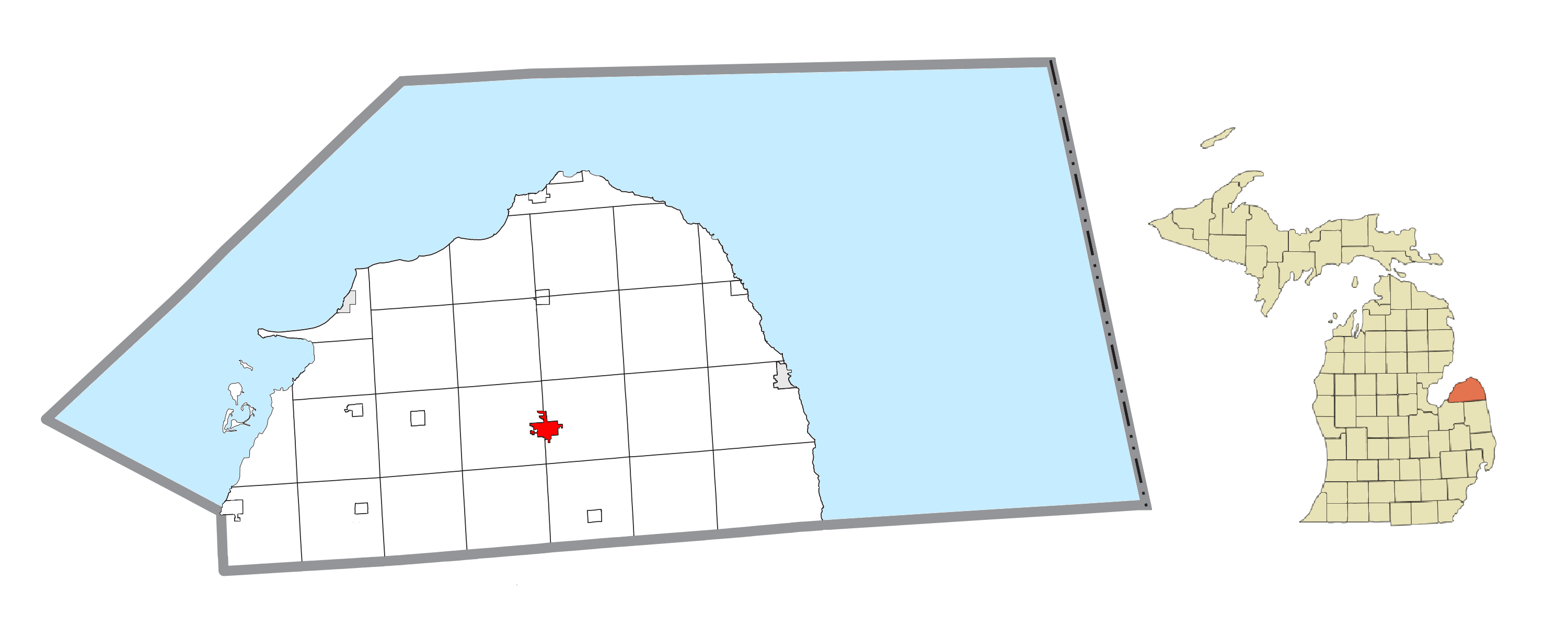
- Location within Huron County

- Location within the state of Michigan
- Coordinates: 43°48′10″N 82°59′59″W
- Country: United States
- State: Michigan
- County: Huron
- Incorporated: 1905 (city)

Government
  - Mayor: Mark Wesley Rolfe

Area
  - Total: 2.33 sq mi (6.03 km^{2})
  - Land: 2.33 sq mi (6.03 km^{2})
  - Water: 0 sq mi (0.00 km^{2})
- Elevation: 758 ft (231 m)

Population (2020)
  - Total: 3,021
  - Density: 1,297.8/sq mi (501.09/km^{2})
- Time zone: UTC-5 (Eastern (EST))
  - Summer (DST): UTC-4 (EDT)
- ZIP code(s): 48413
- Area code: 989
- FIPS code: 26-04740
- GNIS feature ID: 0620421
- Website: cityofbadaxe.com

Bad Axe is a city in the U.S. state of Michigan and the county seat of Huron County in the Thumb region of the Lower Peninsula. The population was 3,021 at the 2020 census, making it the largest community in Huron County and second largest in the Upper Thumb, after Caro.

== History ==
The city was established in 1905. The city's unusual name dates to the time of its settlement. While surveying the first state road through the Huron County wilderness in 1861, Rudolph Papst and George Willis Pack made camp at the future site of the city and found a much-used and badly damaged axe. At Pack's suggestion, Papst used the name “Bad Axe Camp” in the minutes of the survey and on a sign he placed along the main trail. The first post office in Bad Axe was established in 1870.

== Geography ==
According to the United States Census Bureau, the city has an area of 2.26 square miles (5.85 km^{2}), all land.

=== Climate ===
This climatic region has large seasonal temperature differences, with warm to hot (and often humid) summers and cold (sometimes severely cold) winters. According to the Köppen Climate Classification system, Bad Axe has a humid continental climate, abbreviated "Dfb" on climate maps.

Climate data for Bad Axe, Michigan (1991–2020 normals, extremes 1925–present)
Month	Jan	Feb	Mar	Apr	May	Jun	Jul	Aug	Sep	Oct	Nov	Dec	Year
Record high °F (°C)	64 (18)	66 (19)	85 (29)	89 (32)	92 (33)	100 (38)	103 (39)	101 (38)	97 (36)	91 (33)	80 (27)	69 (21)	103 (39)
Mean daily maximum °F (°C)	28.3 (−2.1)	30.2 (−1.0)	40.0 (4.4)	53.3 (11.8)	66.1 (18.9)	76.0 (24.4)	80.3 (26.8)	78.5 (25.8)	72.0 (22.2)	58.7 (14.8)	45.3 (7.4)	34.0 (1.1)	55.2 (12.9)
Daily mean °F (°C)	21.9 (−5.6)	22.9 (−5.1)	31.6 (−0.2)	43.2 (6.2)	55.3 (12.9)	65.4 (18.6)	69.9 (21.1)	68.5 (20.3)	61.5 (16.4)	50.0 (10.0)	38.4 (3.6)	28.5 (−1.9)	46.4 (8.0)
Mean daily minimum °F (°C)	15.6 (−9.1)	15.6 (−9.1)	23.3 (−4.8)	33.1 (0.6)	44.6 (7.0)	54.8 (12.7)	59.5 (15.3)	58.5 (14.7)	51.0 (10.6)	41.3 (5.2)	31.4 (−0.3)	22.9 (−5.1)	37.6 (3.1)
Record low °F (°C)	−23 (−31)	−22 (−30)	−15 (−26)	8 (−13)	22 (−6)	28 (−2)	35 (2)	34 (1)	26 (−3)	15 (−9)	−7 (−22)	−8 (−22)	−23 (−31)
Average precipitation inches (mm)	1.96 (50)	1.88 (48)	1.83 (46)	3.19 (81)	3.34 (85)	3.17 (81)	3.67 (93)	3.36 (85)	3.16 (80)	2.90 (74)	2.36 (60)	2.07 (53)	32.89 (835)
Average precipitation days (≥ 0.01 in)	14.7	11.2	10.2	11.6	12.2	10.4	9.7	10.0	10.7	13.3	12.4	13.5	139.9
Source: NOAA

== Demographics ==
Historical population
Census	Pop.	Note	%±
1880	190		—
1890	842		343.2%
1900	1,241		47.4%
1910	1,559		25.6%
1920	2,140		37.3%
1930	2,332		9.0%
1940	2,624		12.5%
1950	2,973		13.3%
1960	2,998		0.8%
1970	2,999		0.0%
1980	3,184		6.2%
1990	3,484		9.4%
2000	3,462		−0.6%
2010	3,129		−9.6%
2020	3,021		−3.5%
U.S. Decennial Census

=== 2020 census ===
As of the 2020 census, Bad Axe had a population of 3,021. The median age was 43.2 years. 20.6% of residents were under the age of 18 and 23.0% of residents were 65 years of age or older. For every 100 females there were 89.4 males, and for every 100 females age 18 and over there were 85.6 males age 18 and over.

0.0% of residents lived in urban areas, while 100.0% lived in rural areas.

There were 1,362 households in Bad Axe, of which 23.9% had children under the age of 18 living in them. Of all households, 32.3% were married-couple households, 22.9% were households with a male householder and no spouse or partner present, and 37.0% were households with a female householder and no spouse or partner present. About 40.3% of all households were made up of individuals and 17.4% had someone living alone who was 65 years of age or older.

There were 1,522 housing units, of which 10.5% were vacant. The homeowner vacancy rate was 3.6% and the rental vacancy rate was 9.0%.

Racial composition as of the 2020 census
Race	Number	Percent
White	2,823	93.4%
Black or African American	28	0.9%
American Indian and Alaska Native	14	0.5%
Asian	38	1.3%
Native Hawaiian and Other Pacific Islander	0	0.0%
Some other race	24	0.8%
Two or more races	94	3.1%
Hispanic or Latino (of any race)	98	3.2%

=== 2010 census ===
As of the census of 2010, there were 3,129 people, 1,358 households, and 760 families residing in the city. The population density was 1,384.5 inhabitants per square mile (534.6/km^{2}). There were 1,546 housing units at an average density of 684.1 per square mile (264.1/km^{2}). The city's racial makeup was 95.1% White, 0.8% African American, 0.9% Native American, 1.5% Asian, 0.4% from other races, and 1.2% from two or more races. Hispanic or Latino of any race were 2.4% of the population.

There were 1,358 households, of which 27.5% had children under the age of 18 living with them, 36.8% were married couples living together, 14.7% had a female householder with no husband present, 4.4% had a male householder with no wife present, and 44.0% were non-families. 38.7% of all households were made up of individuals, and 17% had someone living alone who was 65 years of age or older. The average household size was 2.16 and the average family size was 2.81.

The median age in the city was 42.9 years. 21.3% of residents were under the age of 18; 8.3% were between the ages of 18 and 24; 23.2% were from 25 to 44; 26.6% were from 45 to 64; and 20.5% were 65 years of age or older. The city's gender makeup was 46.5% male and 53.5% female.

=== 2000 census ===
As of the census of 2000, there were 3,462 people, 1,418 households, and 877 families residing in the city. The population density was 1,617.3 inhabitants per square mile (624.4/km^{2}). There were 1,545 housing units at an average density of 721.8 per square mile (278.7/km^{2}). The city's racial makeup was 97.57% White, 0.26% African American, 0.26% Native American, 0.58% Asian, 0.38% from other races, and 0.95% from two or more races. Hispanic or Latino of any race were 1.53% of the population.

There were 1,418 households, of which 31.7% had children under the age of 18 living with them, 45.3% were married couples living together, 12.9% had a female householder with no husband present, and 38.1% were non-families. 33.5% of all households were made up of individuals, and 15.1% had someone living alone who was 65 years of age or older. The average household size was 2.31 and the average family size was 2.95.

In the city, the population was spread out, with 24.2% under the age of 18, 8.5% from 18 to 24, 27.5% from 25 to 44, 21.6% from 45 to 64, and 18.3% who were 65 years of age or older. The median age was 39 years. For every 100 females, there were 87.5 males. For every 100 females age 18 and over, there were 85.1 males.

The city's median household income was $32,125, and the median family income was $42,650. Males had a median income of $34,758 versus $20,288 for females. The city's per capita income was $17,465. About 9.3% of families and 14.1% of the population were below the poverty line, including 16.1% of those under age 18 and 14.3% of those age 65 or over.

== Education ==
Bad Axe is served by Bad Axe Public Schools, which consist of:

- Bad Axe Elementary.
- Bad Axe Middle School
- Bad Axe High School

The district's George E. Greene Elementary School was shut down in 2011; Ascent High School, an alternative high school, is in its former building. The Bad Axe Elementary School is currently in the building which the district's Intermediate School occupied.

== Media ==
=== Radio ===
Local radio stations licensed to serve Bad Axe are commercial broadcasters WLEW-AM and WLEW-FM.

==== FM ====
- WCTP 88.5 FM, Gagetown, Christian Contemporary, Smile FM
- WSMB 89.3 FM, Harbor Beach, Christian Contemporary, Smile FM
- WIDL 92.1 FM, Cass City, Classic Rock The Thumb's Only Road for Pure Classic Rock
- WBGV 92.5 FM, Marlette, Country, The Thumb's Best Country
- WHNN 96.1 FM, Bay City, Adult Contemporary, The Best Variety of Yesterday and Today
- WTGV 97.7 FM, Sandusky, Classic Hits, The Thumb's Greatest Hits
- WKCQ 98.1 FM, Saginaw, Country, The Most Country
- WLEW 102.1 FM, Bad Axe, Classic Hits, Your Classic Hits Station
- WIOG 102.5 FM, Bay City, CHR/Top 40, The Hit Music Channel
- WQLB 103.3 FM, Tawas City, Classic Hits, Hits FM
- WCZE 103.7 FM, Harbor Beach, Christian Country, Positive Country
- WKJC 104.7 FM, Tawas City, Country Your Favorite Country Hits
- WTZM 106.1 FM, Tawas City, Hot Adult Contemporary, The Point

==== AM ====
- WMIC 660 AM, Sandusky (Daytime Only), Full Service/Country, The Thumb's Information Station
- WSGW 790 AM, Saginaw, News/Talk, Your Connection to the Saginaw Valley and the World
- CHOK 1070 AM, Sarnia, Full Service/AC, First in Local Information
- WJMK 1250 AM, Bridgeport, Oldies, MeTV FM
- WLEW 1340 AM, Bad Axe, Country, The Thumb's Hottest Country
- WKYO 1360 AM, Caro, Oldies, Your Greatest Hits
- WPHM 1380 AM, Port Huron, News/Talk/Sports, Where the Blue Water Area Comes to Talk
- WMAX 1440 AM, Bay City, Religious Talk, Ave Marie Radio
- WIOS 1480 AM, East Tawas, News/Talk, Where Northeast Michigan Comes to Talk

=== Newspapers ===
- Bad Axe and the northern thumb area are served by a daily newspaper, the Huron Daily Tribune and the Huron County View.
- Daily editions of the Detroit Free Press and The Detroit News, as well as thrice-weekly editions of the Bay City Times and Saginaw News, are also available.

=== Broadcast television ===
Huron County lies inside the Flint/Tri-Cities Television Market. Only stations available on Comcast in the Bad Axe area are listed below.

- WNEM 5 (CBS/MyNetworkTV)
- WJRT 12 (ABC)
- WDCQ 19 (PBS)
- WEYI 25 (NBC)
- WBSF 46 (The CW)
- WAQP 49 (Religious)
- WSMH 66 (Fox)

== Infrastructure ==
=== Transportation ===
- M-19
- M-53
- M-142

== Notable people ==
- Allen James Babcock, Roman Catholic bishop; born in Bad Axe
- Lilian Jackson Braun, mystery writer; lived in Bad Axe
- David Clark, Florida state judge and legislator; born in Bad Axe
- George M. Clark, chief justice of the Michigan Supreme Court, lived in Bad Axe
- Helen Beulah Thompson Gaige, herpetologist; born in Bad Axe
- Brad Guigar, cartoonist; grew up in Bad Axe
- Bob Murawski, 2009 Academy Award-winning film editor (The Hurt Locker); high school valedictorian from Bad Axe
- William Potts, who added the yellow light to create the modern, three-lens traffic light; born in Bad Axe
