= Bad Axe Public Schools =

School district in Michigan

Address
- 200 N. Barrie Road Bad Axe, Huron County, Michigan, 48413; United States

District information
- Grades: Kindergarten–12
- Superintendent: Gregory Newland
- Schools: 4
- Budget: $14,253,000 2022-2023 expenditures
- NCES District ID: 2600017

Students and staff
- Students: 791 (2024-2025)
- Teachers: 55.04 (on an FTE basis) (2024-2025)
- Staff: 112.11 FTE (2024-2025)
- Student–teacher ratio: 14.37 (2024-2025)
- District mascot: Hatchets

Other information
- Website: www.badaxeps.org

Bad Axe Public Schools is a public school district in Huron County, in The Thumb region of Michigan. It serves Bad Axe and parts of the townships of Bingham, Colfax, Grant, Lincoln, Meade, Sheridan, and Verona.

== History ==
Bad Axe's first public school was built in 1877. It was destroyed in the Thumb Fire of 1881, and a new permanent school replaced it in 1884. A high school building was built in 1890. The first class graduated in 1892, consisting of one student. The high school also housed Huron County Normal School, a post-secondary program for training teachers.

In the early 1920s, buildings in the district consisted of a high school and a grade school annex, built in 1912. As of 1922, school lunches were served by the "hot lunch club" and sold to students for 15 cents. Thirty to thirty-five lunches were made daily in the cooking classroom of the high school.

In 1924, Bad Axe High School was built at 407 East Woodworth Street, and the previous high school became a dedicated grade school. It was dedicated on January 23, 1925. Michigan Supreme Court justice George M. Clark delivered the dedication address. The school originally housed 700 students and featured a well-equipped gymnasium/auditorium and a basement kitchen that used a dumbwaiter to deliver meals upstairs. The high school attracted students from throughout the county. The 1884 school burned down in 1927. Although the building itself was then used only for storage, the bell in its tall tower was still rung to signal class changes at nearby schools until it was destroyed in the fire.

A new high school opened in fall 1951, designed by Louis C. Kingscott and Associates of Kalamazoo. George E. Green Elementary was built in 1965, named after the elementary school's principal. In fall 1973, the current elementary school opened. It was originally an intermediate school that housed grades four through six. There was initially not enough money to operate the school, as a millage vote failed in April 1973. Another vote was taken in June and the millage was approved.

The current Bad Axe High School opened in January 1996. The former high school became the district's junior high school. The 1925 school, used as a junior high school at the time, was then demolished.

== Schools ==
Schools in Bad Axe Public Schools district
School	Address	Notes
Bad Axe High School	200 N. Barrie Road, Bad Axe	Grades 7–12; built 1996
Bad Axe Middle School	750 S. Van Dyke, Bad Axe	Grades 3–6; built 1951
Bad Axe Elementary	404 Hatchet Drive, Bad Axe	Grades K-2; built 1973
Ascent High School	200 N. Barrie Road, Bad Axe	Alternative high school
