= Hume Township, Michigan =

- Civil township
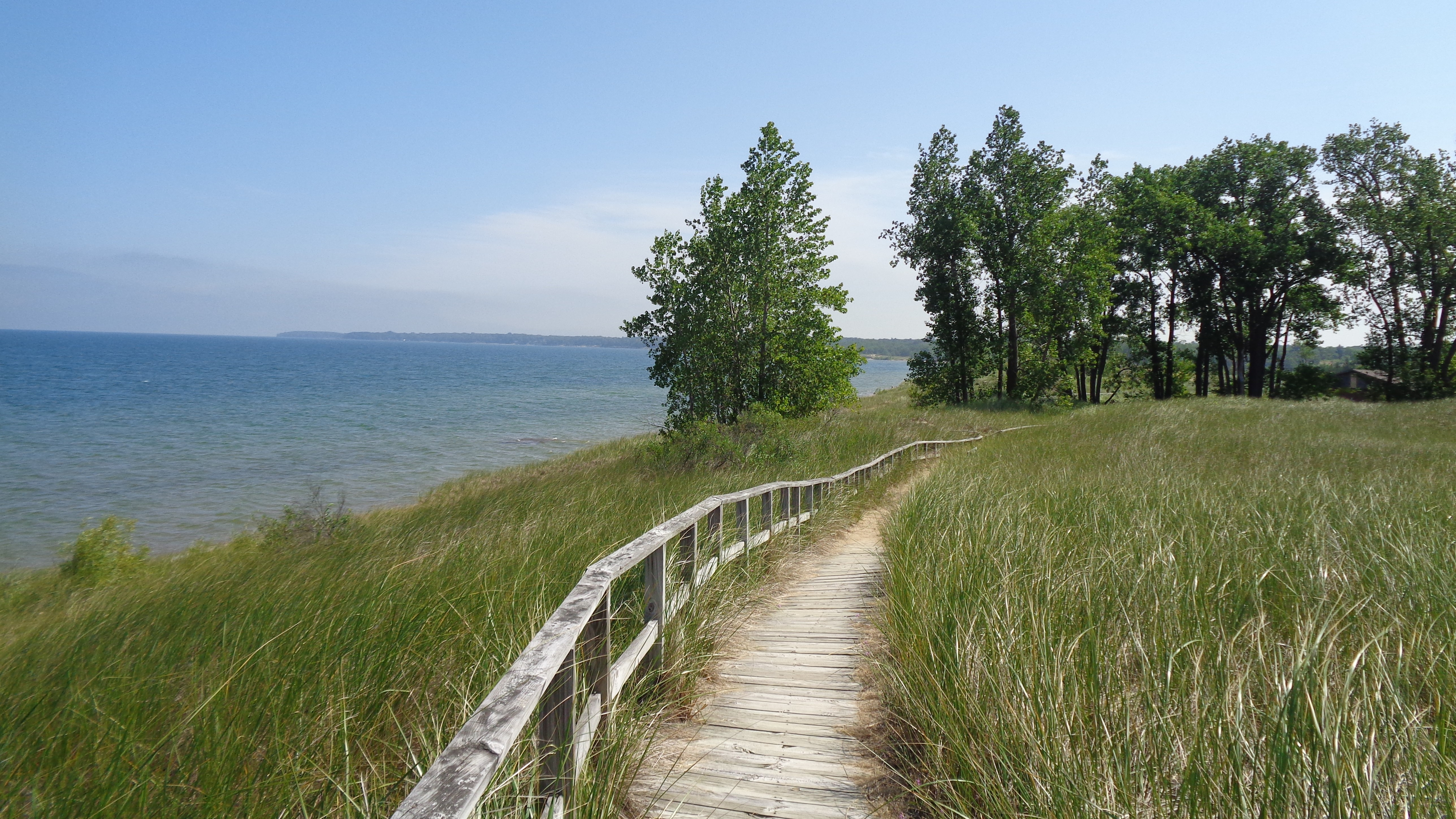
- Lakefront along Port Crescent State Park

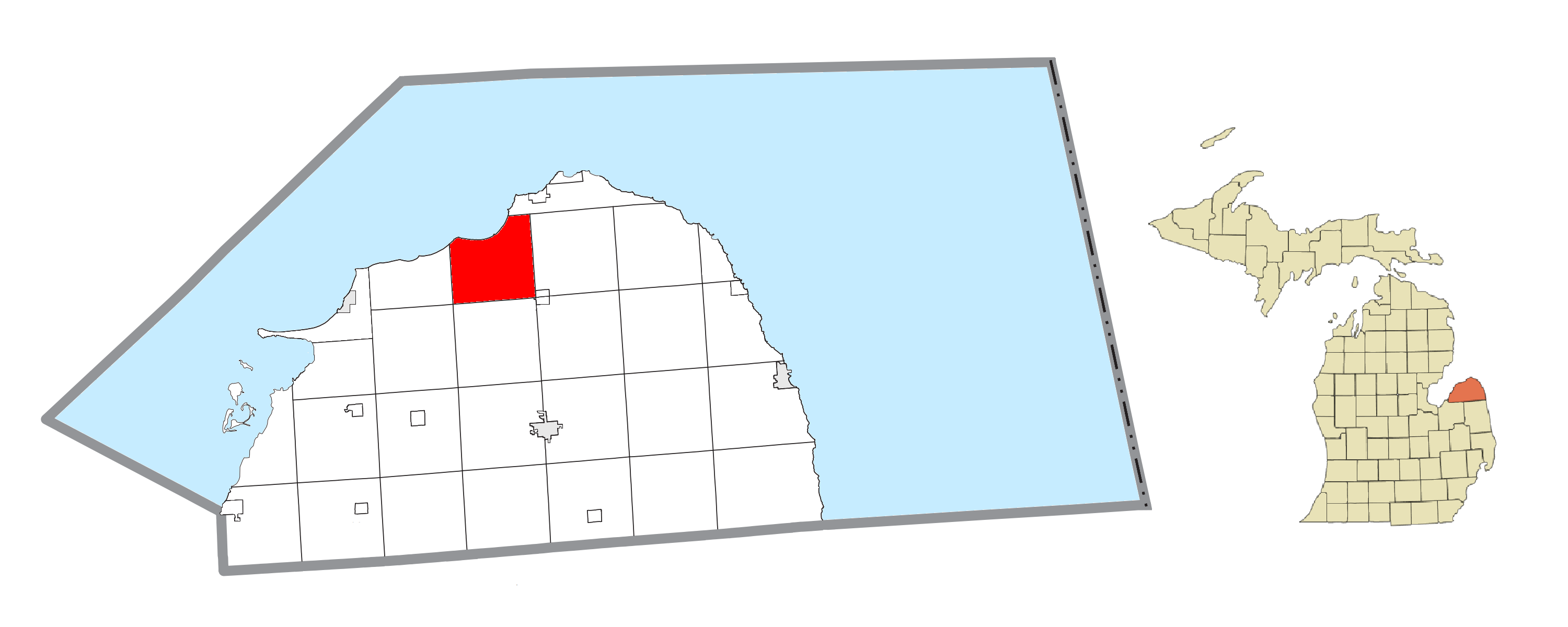
- Location within Huron County

- Location within the state of Michigan Hume Township (the United States)
- Coordinates: 43°58′23″N 83°04′34″W
- Country: United States
- State: Michigan
- County: Huron
- Organized: 1859

Government
  - Supervisor: Jim Roland

Area
  - Total: 30.0 sq mi (77.8 km^{2})
  - Land: 30.0 sq mi (77.7 km^{2})
  - Water: 0.039 sq mi (0.1 km^{2})
- Elevation: 607 ft (185 m)

Population (2020)
  - Total: 739
  - Density: 24.6/sq mi (9.51/km^{2})
- Time zone: UTC-5 (Eastern (EST))
  - Summer (DST): UTC-4 (EDT)
- ZIP code(s): 48445, 48467
- Area code: 989
- FIPS code: 26-39960
- GNIS feature ID: 1626504
- Website: Official website

Hume Township is a civil township of Huron County in the U.S. state of Michigan. As of the 2020 census, the township population was 739.

== Communities ==
- The village of Kinde is at the southeast corner of the township, though none of it is within the township.
- Port Crescent is a ghost town at the mouth of the Pinnebog River on Lake Huron and is now part of Port Crescent State Park.
- Pinnebog is a tiny unincorporated community in the southwest of the township, on the boundary with Meade Township at Kinde and Pinnebog roads 43°56′07″N 83°06′14″W.

== History ==
The township is named after the first white settler in the area, Walter Hume, who arrived and built the first house in the 1850s. He also opened a hotel at the mouth of the Pinnebog River, which was probably the first such structure in this part of the county. Township government was organized in 1860, with the election being held at Hume's store and with Hume being elected the first supervisor. The land was once covered by stands of pine trees, which were long ago cleared and sent to saw mills at Port Crescent on the mouth of the Pinnebog River. The Port Huron Fire of 1871 and Thumb Fire of 1881 also destroyed much remaining timber land.

== Geography ==
According to the United States Census Bureau, the township has a total area of 30.0 square miles (78 km^{2}), of which 30.0 square miles (78 km^{2}) is land and 0.04 square miles (0.10 km^{2}) (0.10%) is water.

== Demographics ==
As of the census of 2000, there were 801 people, 369 households, and 232 families residing in the township. The population density was 26.7 inhabitants per square mile (10.3/km^{2}). There were 853 housing units at an average density of 28.4 per square mile (11.0/km^{2}). The racial makeup of the township was 99.50% White, 0.12% Native American, 0.25% Asian, and 0.12% from two or more races. Hispanic or Latino of any race were 0.62% of the population.

There were 369 households, out of which 22.5% had children under the age of 18 living with them, 56.1% were married couples living together, 4.1% had a female householder with no husband present, and 36.9% were non-families. 32.2% of all households were made up of individuals, and 17.3% had someone living alone who was 65 years of age or older. The average household size was 2.17 and the average family size was 2.76.

In the township the population was spread out, with 18.4% under the age of 18, 5.9% from 18 to 24, 22.2% from 25 to 44, 30.0% from 45 to 64, and 23.6% who were 65 years of age or older. The median age was 47 years. For every 100 females, there were 109.1 males. For every 100 females age 18 and over, there were 101.2 males.

The median income for a household in the township was $33,047, and the median income for a family was $42,361. Males had a median income of $31,029 versus $19,886 for females. The per capita income for the township was $18,810. About 6.2% of families and 9.2% of the population were below the poverty line, including 12.1% of those under age 18 and 6.0% of those age 65 or over.
