= WLEW =

WLEW can refer to:

- WLEW (AM), a radio station (1340 AM) licensed to Bad Axe, Michigan, United States
- WLEW-FM, a radio station (102.1 FM) licensed to Bad Axe, Michigan, United States
