= WHST =

WHST may refer to:

- WHST (FM), a radio station (94.1 FM) licensed to serve Pigeon, Michigan, United States
- WTZM, a radio station (106.1 FM) licensed to serve Tawas City, Michigan, which held the call sign WHST from 1993 to 2017
