= WCZE =

Coordinates: 43.6861°N 82.9944°W

- Harbor Beach, Michigan; United States
- Frequency: 103.7 MHz
- Branding: Positive Country 103+7 FM

Programming
- Format: Country music

Ownership
- Owner: Edward Czelada Revocable Trust

History
- First air date: April 2005
- Call sign meaning: Czelada

Technical information
- Licensing authority: FCC
- Facility ID: 30944
- Class: C2
- ERP: 43,000 watts
- HAAT: 161 meters (528 ft)

Links
- Public license information: Public file; LMS
- Website: c1037.com

WCZE (103.7 FM) is a Commercial broadcasting, country music FM radio station, with an FCC community of license of Harbor Beach, Michigan, however the Ubly, Michigan transmitter site is located centrally to the Thumb's three main counties of Huron, Tuscola and Sanilac.

WCZE is licensed by the FCC to the Edward Czelada Revocable Trust. Jennifer and Edward Czelada are the founders of non-commercial Superior Communications, Michigan Community Radio, Northland Community Broadcasters, and Smile FM.

WCZE began broadcasting in April 2005 from a 450-foot tower near Ubly, Michigan, which is one of the highest land areas in the thumb. The combined tower height and land elevation gives WCZE a total antenna height of 1289 feet above sea level. The station has a signal that covers the thumb area of Michigan and can be heard out to Bay City, Imlay City, Tawas City and often as far as London, Ontario. Oddly, the station broadcast without a license to cover for nearly 7 years due to a complaint filed by Thumb Broadcasting, Inc. (owners of WLEW and WLEW-FM in Bad Axe, Huron County's only other commercial radio stations) with the FCC stating the station wasn't providing a strong enough signal to Harbor Beach. The station disputed the claim but also offered to slightly increase power to 47 kW. On March 26, 2012, the FCC found in WCZE's favor and granted a license of the original construction permit.

WCZE relayed Smile FM until the new Smile FM station at Harbor Beach, WSMB (89.3 FM), came on the air. On December 12, 2012, at 12:12 pm, WCZE began operating as a commercial station with a country music format.
