= M-105 (Michigan highway) =

Former state highway in Huron County, Michigan, United States

M-105
- M-105 highlighted in red on a modern map

Route information
- Maintained by MDOT
- Length: 4.953 mi (7.971 km)
- Existed: 1929–July 1939

Major junctions
- South end: M-53 in Popple
- North end: M-83 near Elkton

Location
- Country: United States
- State: Michigan
- Counties: Huron

Highway system
- Michigan State Trunkline Highway System; Interstate; US; State; Byways
← M-104	→ M-106

M-105 was the designation of a former state trunkline highway in the Thumb region of the US state of Michigan. It served as a connecting route between M-53 in Popple and M-83 (now M-142) near Elkton. The designation was in use in the 1920s and 1930s, and it has not been reused since.

== History ==
The state rejected bids on the construction of M-105 in 1928 on a roadway to run one mile (1.6 km) west of Popple and north of Grassmere to connect with M-83; the State Highway Department said that such a road would be redundant to an existing county road running north from Popple. The Huron County Commission asked the department to reconsider its decision in October 1928. In May of the next year, the MSHD was soliciting bids for the construction of a bridge two miles (3.2 km) south of Grassmere for M-105, and construction of the highway started that July. The July 25, 1929, edition of the state's highway map showed M-105 running due north on a gravel road from M-53 at Popple, but by January 1, 1930, the alignment was shifted on maps to run west of Popple before turning northward to M-83 along different gravel roads.

Between January 1, 1929, and December 31, 1932, the state highway department improved the highway with 16 feet (4.9 m) of gravel over 5.0 miles (8.0 km) and one bridge. Additional gravel was purchased for the highway in 1936, and the highway formed part of a detour in 1937 for a paving project on M-53. In 1936, the state's traffic surveys showed between 138 and 231 vehicles a day using the highway on average.

The designation was decommissioned in July 1939 when the roadway was transferred back to local control. As of 2025, the designation is not in use.

After the designation was removed, the Community Club of Huron County sent a resolution to State Highway Commissioner Murray D. Van Wagoner requesting that the state create a replacement state highway connecting M-53 and M-83 along a different roadway parallel to the former M-105.

== Major intersections ==
The entire highway was in Colfax Township, Huron County.

mi	km	Destinations	Notes
0.000	0.000	M-53 (Van Dyke Road)	
4.953	7.971	M-83 (Pigeon Road)	
1.000 mi = 1.609 km; 1.000 km = 0.621 mi
