= Elizabeth Barr Arthur =

American poet, author, journalist, librarian and suffragist

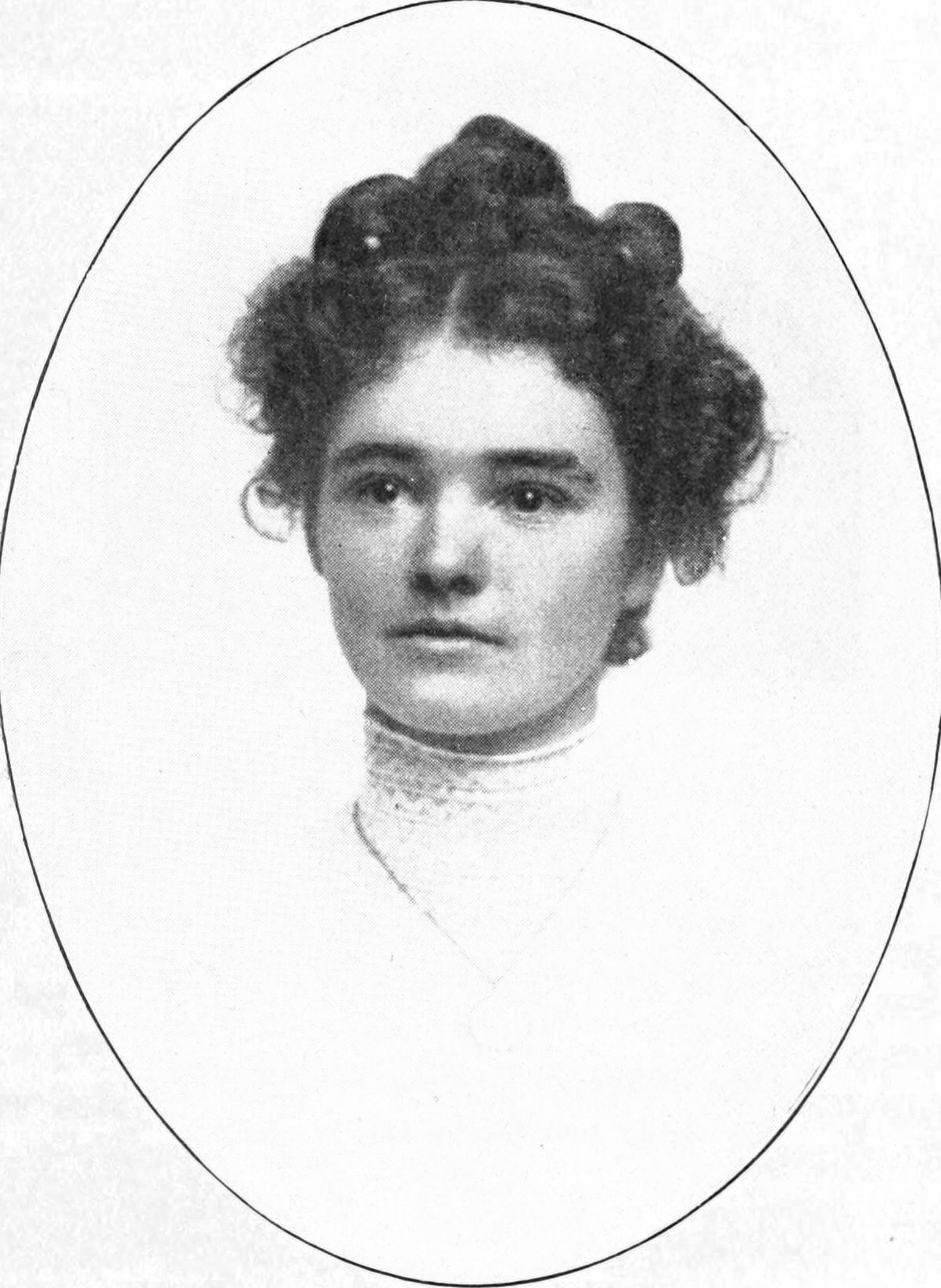
- (1908)
- Born: Elizabeth Barr; 1884; Lincoln County, Kansas, U.S.
- Died: May 8, 1971 (aged 86–87); Roeland Park, Kansas, U.S.
- Education: Washburn College
- Occupations: poet; author; journalist; librarian; police officer; suffragist
- Spouse: Chester Barnet Arthur
- Writing career
- Pen name: Elizabeth N. Barr
- Genres: poetry; history
- Movement: suffrage

Elizabeth Barr Arthur (née, Barr; after marriage, Arthur; pen name, Elizabeth N. Barr; 1884–1971) was an American poet, author, journalist, librarian, and suffragist. In 1913, she joined the police force in Topeka, Kansas, together with Eva Corning, the two of them becoming the first women in the U.S. to hold positions of regular patrolmen. She was the editor and publisher of the Club Member and Current Topics papers. She was a prolific author, writing editorial, historical and feature pieces, but she preferred to be remembered as a poet.

== Early life and education ==
Elizabeth Barr was born in a dugout in Lincoln County, Kansas, in 1884. William Lovejoy Barr (1845–1936) and Mary Jane (Cole) Barr (1857–1925). Her parents were siblings were Anna, John, Margaret, and Lawrence. When Elizabeth was two years of age, her parents removed to Huron County, Michigan.

After a district school course, she acquired a high school education in the Bad Axe High School, graduating in 1902, but through many hardships, such as daily covering 6 miles (9.7 km) of bad roads.

== Career ==
Arthur became a been a pioneer in reforms and welfare work for women and children. During a sojourn in Florida for two years, she traveled all over that state and Georgia as an organizer of the Temperance Educational Bureau.

In 1904, she went to Kansas City, Missouri, where she was for a time employed on the advertising force of the Kansas City Journal.

In 1905, she went to Topeka, Kansas with a total capital of US$11 and entered Washburn College. In 1906, her first book, a collection of college poems entitled Washburn Ballads, was published. She graduated from Washburn College in 1908, in the liberal arts course, having attained considerable local reputation as a poet and writer of short stories while in college.

After her graduation, Arthur became the assistant editor and later the editor of the Club Member, the organ of the Women's Clubs of the state. In this capacity, Arthur met all the leading women in Kansas and became known to thousands. Being an ardent suffragist, Barr made her paper an active suffrage organ and took an important part in the campaign before the legislature in 1911 which resulted in a favorable amendment. (Note: According to The Olathe Register (1924), Arthur did much to mould public sentiment for the women suffrage amendment to the Kansas constitution of 1913.)

For the next two years, Arthur did research work and was a co-writer on Blackmar's Encyclopedia History of Kansas published in 1912.

Arthur was the first entrant for examination for policewoman in Topeka. Early in 1913, Arthur became a member of the police force in Topeka with the title of patrolman-at-large. She and her colleague, Miss Eva Corning, were the first women in the U.S. to hold positions of regular patrolmen.

After leaving police work -she had married Chester B. Arthur in the meantime- she again did research work and was one of the writers on the Connelly History of Kansas. Her principal contribution to this work was a 45,000 word article on "The Populist Uprising", which was considered by some critics to be the best history on the subject.

When World War I broke out, Arthur went to Washington, D.C., as an editorial clerk for the Government. After leaving the Government Service, she became associated with the Federal Employees Union as assistant editor of its magazine, and later of the Reclassificationist, a weekly paper devoted to Civil Service reform.

For more than a year prior to coming to Olathe, Kansas in July 1922, Arthur was a graduate student at Research University in Washington, D.C. in pursuit of a master's degree from that institution.

Under her pen name, "Elizabeth N. Barr", she contributed poems and special articles to Munseys Magazine, Physical Culture, and other Eastern magazines. In 1923, also under her pen name, Arthur published a new book of poems, The High Winds of Home. Most of her early poems are found in her three published books. Arthur's poetry is widely varied in its moods and style, from the song type of the ballad to the deeply mystical, touched at times with the extreme classical and oriental. The reader can detect the influence of her early life of the northland, and amidst the flowering savannas of the South with hits everglades, while the prairie of her native Kansas home often shapes her themes. Barr was also the author of several short county histories of various counties in Kansas.

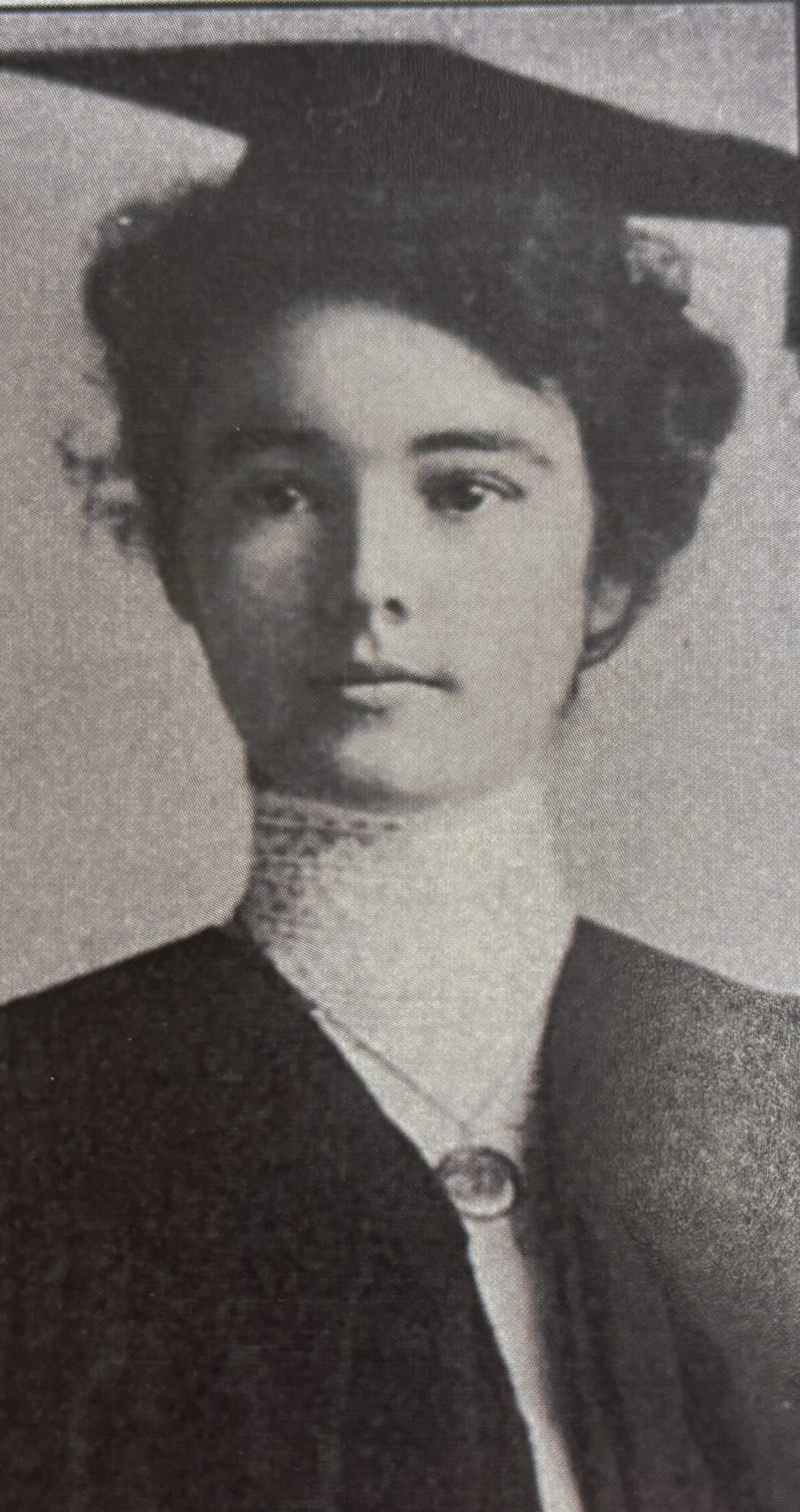
(1908)

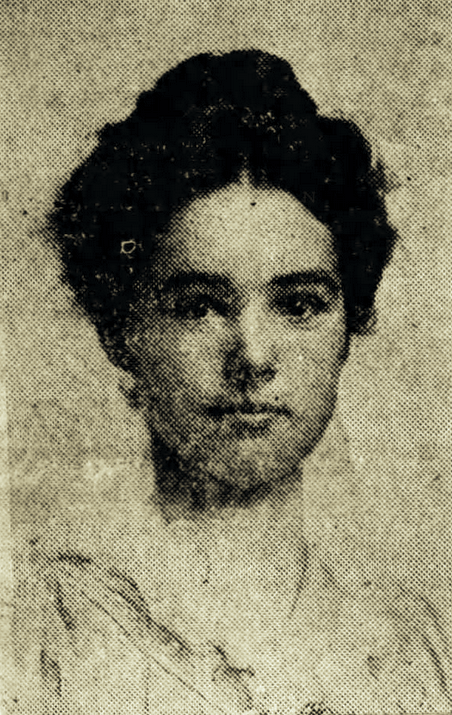
(1923)

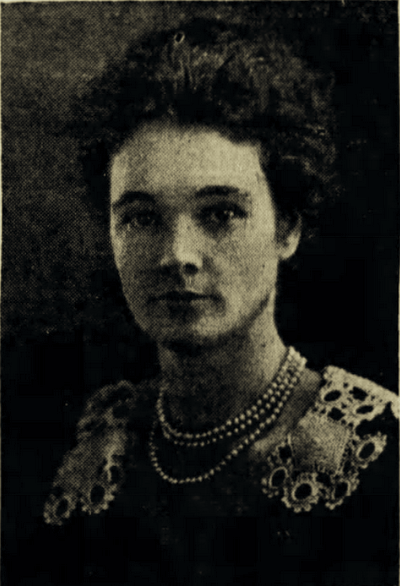
(1924)

In 1923, Arthur became Olathe's librarian.

As one of the charter members of the Kansas Author's Club, her freelance style of poetry and independence in argument always enlivened its meetings during the club's formative years, even if it often shocked those devoted to old school repertoire. In 1907, Arthur served as club secretary.

== Personal life ==
She married Chester Barnet Arthur (1885–1957).

Elizabeth Barr Arthur died at Roeland Park, Kansas, May 8, 1971.

== Selected works ==
- Business Directory and History of Jackson County, 1907 (text)
- A souvenir history of Lincoln County, Kansas, 1908 (text)

=== Contributor ===
- Blackmar, Frank W. (ed.), Kansas; a cyclopedia of state history, embracing events, institutions, industries, counties, cities, towns, prominent persons, etc. ... with a supplementary volume devoted to selected personal history and reminiscence (1912) (text)
- Connelley, William E. (ed.), History of Kansas (1917, 1918, and 1929) (text)

=== Poetry collections ===
- Washburn Ballads, 1906
- The High Winds of Home, 1923
