= Colfax Township, Huron County, Michigan =

Colfax Township, Michigan
- Civil township
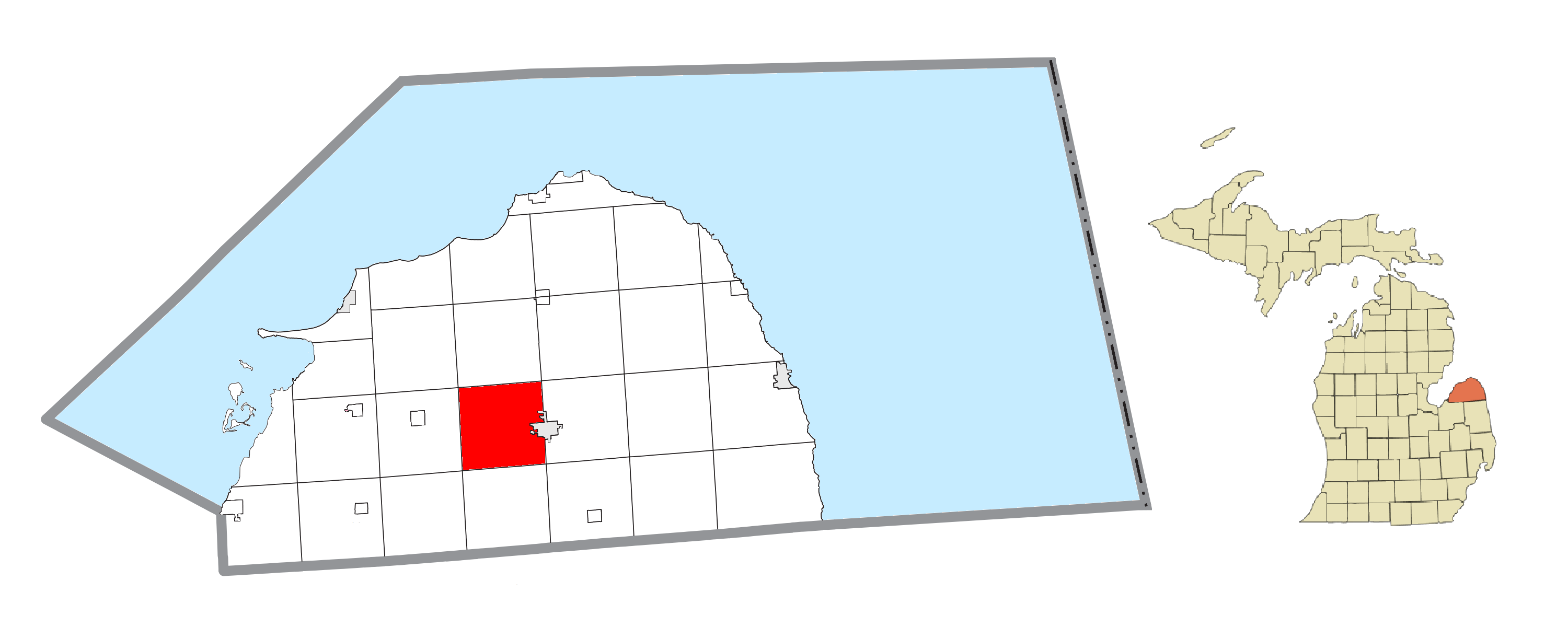
- Location within Huron County

- Location within the state of Michigan Colfax Township (the United States)
- Coordinates: 43°48′26″N 83°03′05″W
- Country: United States
- State: Michigan
- County: Huron
- Established: 1808

Government
  - Supervisor: Doug Gentner

Area
  - Total: 34.9 sq mi (90.5 km^{2})
  - Land: 34.9 sq mi (90.4 km^{2})
  - Water: 0.039 sq mi (0.1 km^{2})
- Elevation: 728 ft (222 m)

Population (2020)
  - Total: 1,753
  - Density: 50.2/sq mi (19.4/km^{2})
- Time zone: UTC-5 (Eastern (EST))
  - Summer (DST): UTC-4 (EDT)
- ZIP code(s): 48413, 48731
- Area code: 989
- FIPS code: 26-17140
- GNIS feature ID: 1626112
- Website: Official website

Colfax Township is a civil township of Huron County in the U.S. state of Michigan. The population was 1,753 at the 2020 census.

== Communities ==
- The city of Bad Axe is on the eastern boundary and has incorporated land that had formerly been in the township.
- Popple is a tiny unincorporated community in the southwest corner of the township along M-53/S. Van Dyke Road between Pinnebog and Kilmanagh/Popple Roads about five miles southwest of Bad Axe on the Pinnebog River at 43°46′16″N 83°05′46″W. From 1928 to 1939, Popple was the southern terminus of M-105, which connected M-53 with then M-83 (now M-142. The community was at first known as "Finger Board" when it was founded in 1870. When it was given a post office in January 1882, the name was changed to Popple after the popple tree (Populus tremuloides). The first postmaster was Samuel Hurd Wright. The post office closed in January 1883, but was restored from October 1883 until August 1905.
- Grassmere was a railroad station and post office on the border with Oliver Township. The station served the Saginaw, Tuscola & Huron Railroad. The post office operated from 1891 until 1909; M. A. Vogel was its first postmaster.

== Geography ==
According to the United States Census Bureau, the township has a total area of 35.0 square miles (91 km^{2}), of which 34.9 square miles (90 km^{2}) is land and 0.04 square miles (0.10 km^{2}) (0.09%) is water.

== Demographics ==
As of the census of 2000, there were 1,954 people, 702 households, and 513 families residing in the township. The population density was 56.0 inhabitants per square mile (21.6/km^{2}). There were 765 housing units at an average density of 21.9 per square mile (8.5/km^{2}). The racial makeup of the township was 97.85% White, 0.46% African American, 0.20% Native American, 0.15% Asian, 0.67% from other races, and 0.67% from two or more races. Hispanic or Latino of any race were 1.84% of the population.

There were 702 households, out of which 31.8% had children under the age of 18 living with them, 61.8% were married couples living together, 8.8% had a female householder with no husband present, and 26.9% were non-families. 22.6% of all households were made up of individuals, and 9.3% had someone living alone who was 65 years of age or older. The average household size was 2.59 and the average family size was 3.05.

In the township the population was spread out, with 24.5% under the age of 18, 7.1% from 18 to 24, 25.8% from 25 to 44, 23.8% from 45 to 64, and 18.8% who were 65 years of age or older. The median age was 41 years. For every 100 females, there were 94.6 males. For every 100 females age 18 and over, there were 88.3 males.

The median income for a household in the township was $42,727, and the median income for a family was $51,081. Males had a median income of $34,879 versus $21,767 for females. The per capita income for the township was $19,237. About 2.4% of families and 3.3% of the population were below the poverty line, including 2.6% of those under age 18 and 6.3% of those age 65 or over.
