= WTZM =

Radio station in Tawas City, Michigan

Coordinates: 44°16′25″N 83°39′48″W

- Tawas City, Michigan; United States
- Frequency: 106.1 MHz
- Branding: 106.1 The Point

Programming
- Format: Hot adult contemporary

Ownership
- Owner: Carroll Enterprises, Inc.
- Sister stations: WQLB, WKJC, WIOS

History
- First air date: November 1, 1973 (as WDBI-FM at 101.7)
- Former call signs: WDBI-FM (1972–1993); WHST (1993–2017)
- Former frequencies: 101.7 MHz (1973–1993); 107.3 MHz (1993–1997)
- Call sign meaning: Sounds like "Tawas, Michigan"

Technical information
- Licensing authority: FCC
- Facility ID: 29285
- Class: C3
- ERP: 25,000 watts
- HAAT: 93 meters (305 ft)

Links
- Public license information: Public file; LMS
- Webcast: Listen live
- Website: thepointfm.net

WTZM is a radio station licensed to Tawas City, Michigan. Owned by Carroll Enterprises, Inc., WTZM airs a hot adult contemporary format branded as "106.1 The Point".

== History ==
=== Beginnings as WDBI ===
WTZM initially signed on as WDBI on November 1, 1973, operating originally at 101.7 MHz. The station was founded by Lawrence Norman DeBeau the year before, when the construction permit was first granted. Studios and offices were located at 1175 South U.S. 23 in Tawas City. The station initially began with a beautiful music format. DeBeau served as president, general manager and news director. Mildred DeBeau was promotions director and music director, while Mark L. DeBeau served as program director and chief engineer.

On November 13, 1979, WDBI was sold to Pridinia Broadcasting Company, headed by John Pridinia, who also served as the new general manager. The format and call letters remained the same, until the station was sold again on May 11, 1983 to Tawas City Broadcasting Company, owned by Donald J. Backus. Upon this ownership change becoming final, the station dropped its longtime beautiful music format in favor of adult contemporary music. Backus also served as the station's general manager and chief engineer.

=== As WHST ===
In January 1993, the station became WHST, following its sale to Ives Broadcasting Company, based in Alpena, about 30 miles north of Tawas City. Under the ownership change, the station moved to 107.3 MHz, which allowed the station to more than double its power to six thousand watts. The station also moved its studios and offices to 130 Newman Street in East Tawas. With the move came a format change from adult contemporary to CHR/Hot AC, with WHST simulcasting its new co-owned sister, WHSB.

The simulcast also involved another station, WBMI in West Branch, about 30 miles west of Tawas City. The intention by Ives Broadcasting was to create a CHR powerhouse along Michigan's fabled "Sunrise Side" under the branding of the "Northern Radio Network". While WHSB dominated the ratings in its home market, WHST and WBMI did not prosper, and both ultimately reverted to separate programming.

Four years later, WHST moved from 107.3 to 106.1 and took the name "Mix 106," continuing to air ABC Radio's Best Hits, Best Variety format with some local shows. This continued until the station went dark in 2000, returning to the air the following year with Northern Christian Radio's programming as "The Promise FM."

=== As WTZM ===
In July 2017, the station was sold to Carroll Enterprises, Inc. In December 2017, the station returned to the air after a period of silence with a return to Hot AC (the original format heard on the 106.1 frequency two decades earlier) as 106.1 The Point, and changed its call letters to WTZM. Programming comes from Westwood One.
