= Port Crescent State Park =

Park in Michigan, USA

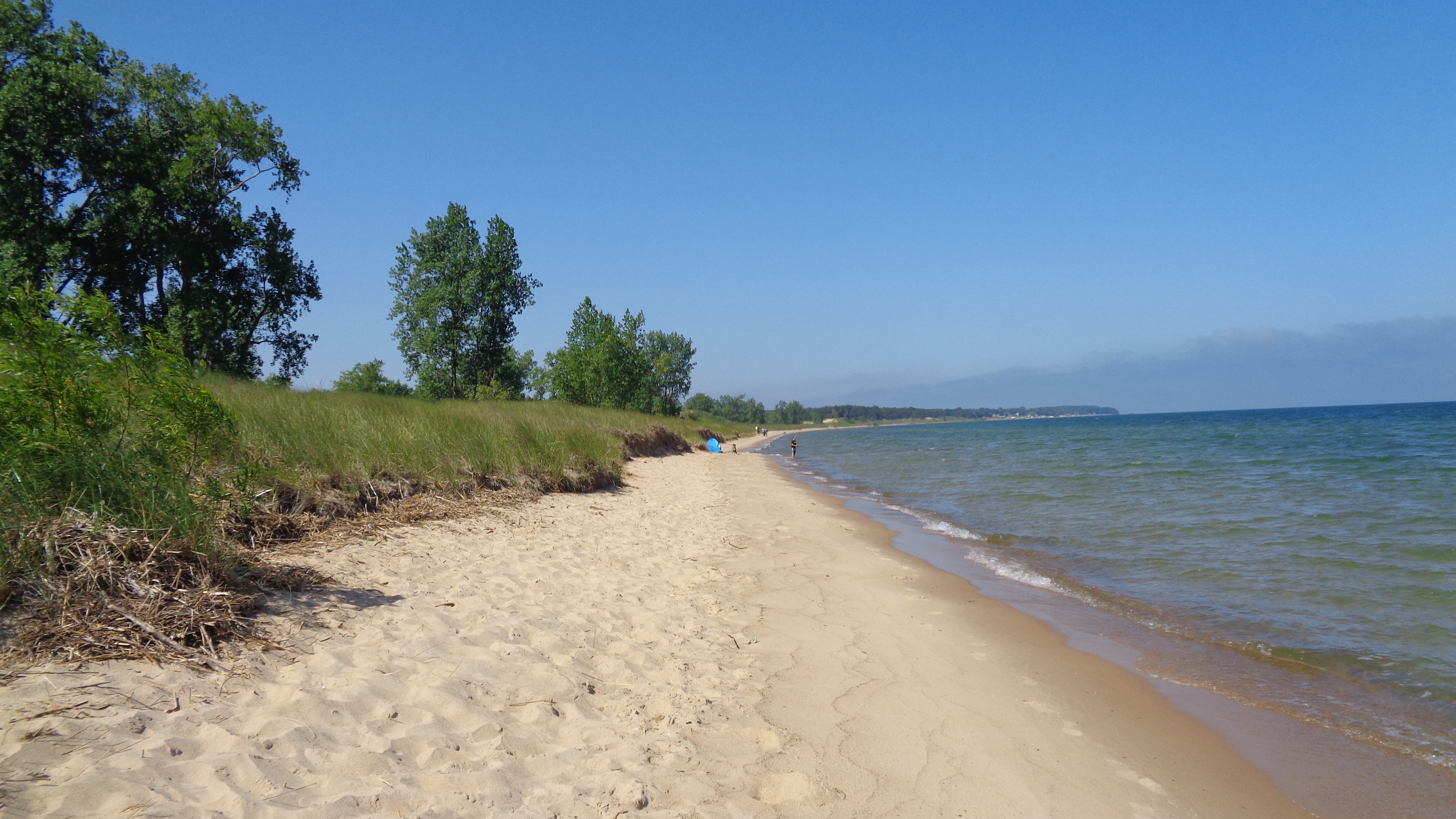
- Beachfront and sand dunes along Lake Huron

- Location within Michigan Location within the United States
- Location: Hume Township, Huron County, Michigan, United States
- Nearest city: Port Austin, Michigan
- Coordinates: 44°00′17″N 83°03′18″W
- Area: 640 acres (260 ha)
- Elevation: 587 feet (179 m)
- Established: 1955
- Administrator: Michigan Department of Natural Resources
- Designation: Michigan state park
- Website: Official website

Port Crescent State Park is a public recreation area on Lake Huron five miles (8.0 km) southwest of Port Austin in Huron County at the tip of The Thumb of Michigan. The state park covers 640 acres (260 ha) along state route M-25 in Hume Township. The park occupies the site of Port Crescent, a ghost town which once stood at the mouth of the Pinnebog River. The park was designated a Michigan "dark sky preserve" in 2012.

== History ==
The park's first 124 acres were purchased by the state in 1956. One of the last visible remnants of the vanished town of Port Crescent, the 120-foot-tall Pack & Woods Sawmill chimney, was razed in 1961, despite the objections of residents who felt the loss of the local landmark. The park was expanded with the purchase of an additional 455 acres in 1977.

== Activities and amenities ==
The state park offers swimming, picnicking, canoeing, fishing, 5 miles (8.0 km) of hiking trails, cross-country skiing, and a 142-site campground and cabin.
