= Huron Daily Tribune =

Daily newspaper in Bad Axe, Michigan, US

- Type: Daily newspaper
- Format: Broadsheet
- Owner(s): Hearst Communications
- Editor: Eric Young
- Headquarters: 211 North Heisterman Street; Bad Axe, Michigan 48413; United States
- Circulation: 2,002 (as of 2022)
- Website: michigansthumb.com

The Huron Daily Tribune is a daily newspaper in Bad Axe, Michigan. The newspaper serves Huron County, in the upper part of "The Thumb". Its parent company, Huron Publishing Company, is owned by Hearst Corporation.

In 1979, Hearst took over the Huron Publishing Company based in Bad Axe, Michigan, in the Thumb area of Huron County. This takeover also incorporated Huron Publishing's weekly newspapers in the neighboring counties, namely the Marlette Leader in Tuscola and the Vassar Pioneer Times in Sanilac.
