= Bad Axe High School =

High school in Bad Axe, Michigan

Location
- 200 North Barrie Road; Bad Axe, Michigan 48413; United States; 43°48′28″N 83°00′57″W

Information
- Type: Public secondary school
- School district: Bad Axe Public Schools
- Superintendent: Gregory Newland
- Principal: Craig Archer
- Teaching staff: 27.53 (on an FTE basis)
- Grades: 7-12
- Enrollment: 336 (2024-2025)
- Student to teacher ratio: 12.20
- Colors: Blue and gold
- Athletics conference: Greater Thumb Conference
- Nickname: Hatchets
- Website: www.badaxeps.org/o/bah

Bad Axe High School is a public high school located in Bad Axe, Michigan, United States. It serves grades 7-12 for the Bad Axe Public Schools.

== Athletics ==
The Bad Axe Hatchets compete in the Big Thumb Conference. School colors are blue and gold. The following Michigan High School Athletic Association (MHSAA) sanctioned sports are offered:

- Baseball (boys)
- Basketball (girls and boys)
- Bowling (girls and boys)
- Cross country (girls and boys)
- Football (boys)
- Golf (boys)
- Gymnastics (girls)
- Ice hockey (boys)
- Soccer (girls and boys)
- Softball (girls)
- Tennis (girls)
- Track and field (girls and boys)
- Volleyball (girls)
- Wrestling (boys)
