= Dwight Township, Michigan =

- Civil township
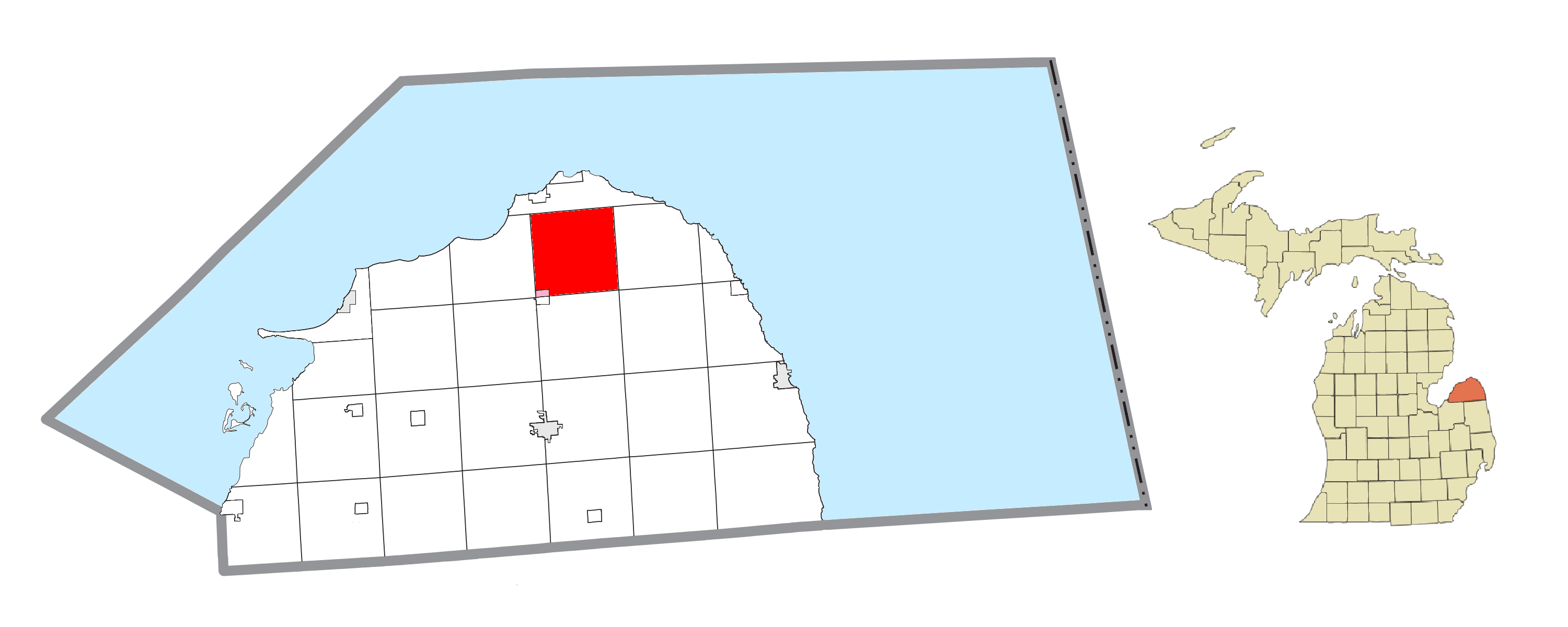
- Location within Huron County (red) and an administered portion of the Kinde village (pink)

- Location within the state of Michigan Dwight Township (the United States)
- Coordinates: 43°58′36″N 82°57′24″W
- Country: United States
- State: Michigan
- County: Huron

Area
  - Total: 35.7 sq mi (92.5 km^{2})
  - Land: 35.7 sq mi (92.4 km^{2})
  - Water: 0 sq mi (0.0 km^{2})
- Elevation: 690 ft (210 m)

Population (2020)
  - Total: 708
  - Density: 19.8/sq mi (7.66/km^{2})
- Time zone: UTC-5 (Eastern (EST))
  - Summer (DST): UTC-4 (EDT)
- ZIP code(s): 48445, 48467
- Area code: 989
- FIPS code: 26-23540
- GNIS feature ID: 1626199

Dwight Township is a civil township of Huron County in the U.S. state of Michigan. The population was 708 at the 2020 census.

== Communities ==
- The village of Kinde is located on the boundary between Dwight Township and Lincoln Township, with about half of the village in both. A small portion of the village is within Meade Township.
- Glencoe is an unincorporated community on the Township's border with Huron Township at Verona and Day Roads. It had a post office from 1901 to 1914.

== Geography ==
According to the United States Census Bureau, the township has a total area of 35.7 square miles (92 km^{2}), of which 35.7 square miles (92 km^{2}) is land and 0.04 square miles (0.10 km^{2}) (0.06%) is water.

== Demographics ==
As of the census of 2000, there were 930 people, 354 households, and 248 families residing in the township. The population density was 26.1 inhabitants per square mile (10.1/km^{2}). There were 402 housing units at an average density of 11.3 per square mile (4.4/km^{2}). The racial makeup of the township was 98.60% White, 0.11% African American, 0.65% Native American, 0.32% Asian, and 0.32% from two or more races. Hispanic or Latino of any race were 0.11% of the population.

There were 354 households, out of which 33.9% had children under the age of 18 living with them, 56.8% were married couples living together, 7.9% had a female householder with no husband present, and 29.9% were non-families. 27.1% of all households were made up of individuals, and 15.8% had someone living alone who was 65 years of age or older. The average household size was 2.61 and the average family size was 3.15.

In the township the population was spread out, with 27.4% under the age of 18, 8.0% from 18 to 24, 26.9% from 25 to 44, 20.8% from 45 to 64, and 17.0% who were 65 years of age or older. The median age was 37 years. For every 100 females, there were 103.5 males. For every 100 females age 18 and over, there were 99.1 males.

The median income for a household in the township was $35,000, and the median income for a family was $38,698. Males had a median income of $31,607 versus $15,865 for females. The per capita income for the township was $14,598. About 7.3% of families and 11.1% of the population were below the poverty line, including 14.1% of those under age 18 and 11.0% of those age 65 or over.
