= WKJC =

Coordinates: 44.413°N 83.621°W

- Tawas City, Michigan; United States
- Broadcast area
- Frequency: 104.7 MHz
- Branding: WKJC 104.7 FM

Programming
- Format: Country
- Affiliations: Michigan News Network, NASCAR, ABC Radio Network

Ownership
- Owner: Carroll Enterprises

History
- First air date: 1980
- Former frequencies: 103.9 MHz
- Call sign meaning: John Carroll

Technical information
- Licensing authority: FCC
- Facility ID: 9123
- Class: C2
- ERP: 50,000 watts
- HAAT: 150 meters

Links
- Public license information: Public file; LMS
- Webcast: Listen live
- Website: wkjc.com

WKJC (104.7 FM) is a radio station broadcasting a country music format. Licensed to Tawas City, Michigan, United States, it first began broadcasting in 1980 at 103.9 MHz. WKJC is locally programmed.

== History ==
WKJC went on the air in January 1980. The station was founded by John Carroll, then-owner of Tawas City, Michigan radio station WIOS, who noted a lack of a country music format in the area. Construction for the new station required $140,000 of studio equipment and construction of a 240-foot (73 m) tower near Sand Lake. From the beginning, the station also broadcast Detroit Tigers baseball games, local high school football games, and a polka show on Sunday nights. The station changed its frequency to 104.7 in 1987, allowing it to increase to 50,000 watts of power. The station also built a new tower at this point. A fire damaged the station's building in August 1987, damaging the station's audio archives. This also caused the station to temporarily go off-air and transport its offices to a trailer until they were rebuilt. At the time, the offices also housed WIOS and Northern Information Service, a low-power television station in the Tawas City area.

Between 1993 and 1998, WKJC was simulcast on WKJZ 94.9 FM in Hillman, Michigan. In 1998, WKJZ was switched to a simulcast of WKJC's sister station, classic rocker WQLB 103.3 FM (now adult hits as "Hits FM"), which is also located in Tawas City.
