= Elkton, Michigan =

- Village
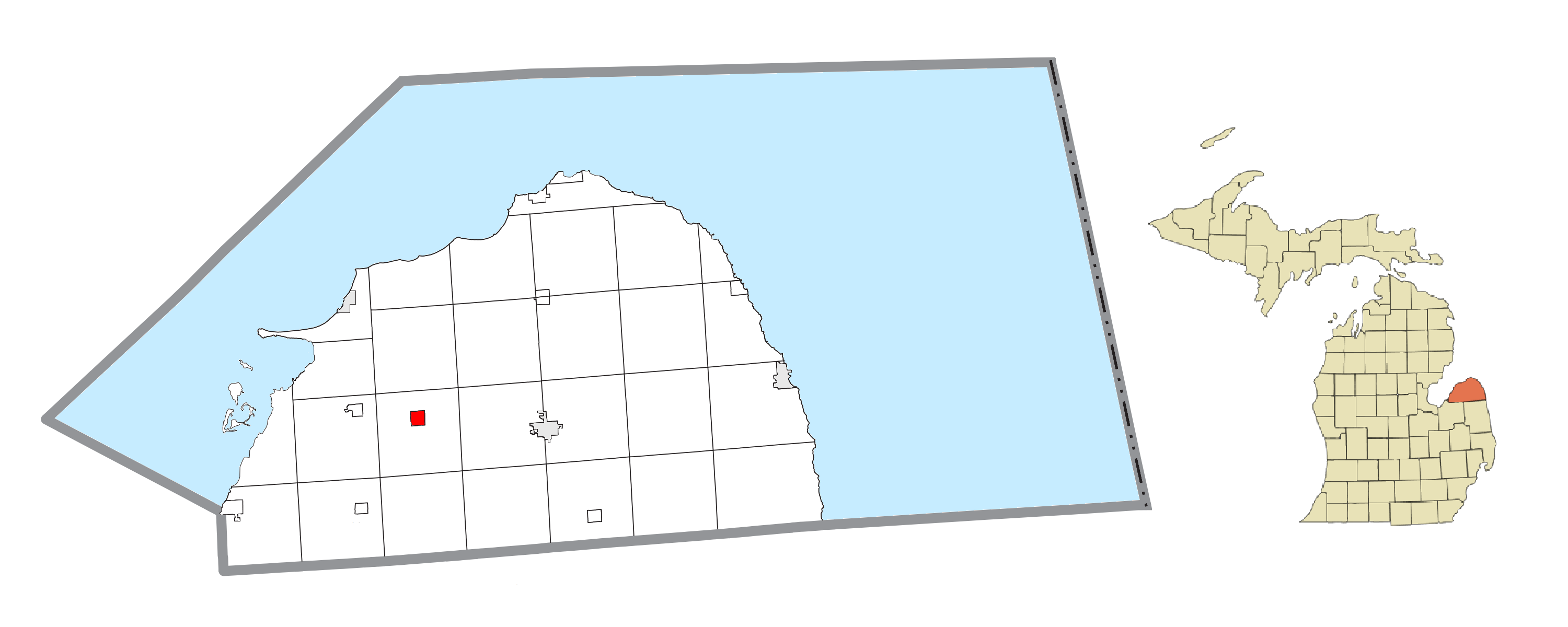
- Location within Huron County

- Location within the state of Michigan
- Coordinates: 43°49′08″N 83°10′52″W
- Country: United States
- State: Michigan
- County: Huron
- Township: Oliver
- Founded: 1886

Government
  - Type: Village council
  - President: Randy Haley

Area
  - Total: 1.00 sq mi (2.59 km^{2})
  - Land: 1.00 sq mi (2.59 km^{2})
  - Water: 0 sq mi (0.00 km^{2})
- Elevation: 640 ft (195 m)

Population (2020)
  - Total: 796
  - Density: 795.0/sq mi (306.96/km^{2})
- Time zone: UTC-5 (Eastern (EST))
  - Summer (DST): UTC-4 (EDT)
- ZIP code(s): 48731
- Area code: 989
- FIPS code: 26-25360
- GNIS feature ID: 0625466
- Website: Official website

Elkton is a village in Huron County in the U.S. state of Michigan. The population was 796 at the 2020 census. The village is within Oliver Township, along the Pinnebog River. It was incorporated in 1897.

== Geography ==
According to the United States Census Bureau, the village has a total area of 1.00 square mile (2.59 km^{2}), all land.

== Demographics ==
Historical population
Census	Pop.	Note	%±
1900	471		—
1910	553		17.4%
1920	500		−9.6%
1930	538		7.6%
1940	539		0.2%
1950	854		58.4%
1960	1,014		18.7%
1970	973		−4.0%
1980	953		−2.1%
1990	958		0.5%
2000	863		−9.9%
2010	808		−6.4%
2020	796		−1.5%
U.S. Decennial Census

=== 2010 census ===
As of the census of 2010, there were 808 people, 349 households, and 223 families living in the village. The population density was 808.0 inhabitants per square mile (312.0/km^{2}). There were 387 housing units at an average density of 387.0 per square mile (149.4/km^{2}). The racial makeup of the village was 96.4% White, 0.1% African American, 0.4% Native American, 0.6% from other races, and 2.5% from two or more races. Hispanic or Latino of any race were 2.5% of the population.

There were 349 households, of which 34.1% had children under the age of 18 living with them, 42.1% were married couples living together, 14.3% had a female householder with no husband present, 7.4% had a male householder with no wife present, and 36.1% were non-families. 29.8% of all households were made up of individuals, and 14.6% had someone living alone who was 65 years of age or older. The average household size was 2.32 and the average family size was 2.79.

The median age in the village was 36.3 years. 26.1% of residents were under the age of 18; 8% were between the ages of 18 and 24; 26.6% were from 25 to 44; 23.7% were from 45 to 64; and 15.5% were 65 years of age or older. The gender makeup of the village was 47.9% male and 52.1% female.

=== 2000 census ===
As of the census of 2000, there were 863 people, 368 households, and 246 families living in the village. The population density was 870.6 inhabitants per square mile (336.1/km^{2}). There were 392 housing units at an average density of 395.4 per square mile (152.7/km^{2}). The racial makeup of the village was 97.57% White, 0.35% African American, 0.35% Asian, 0.12% from other races, and 1.62% from two or more races. Hispanic or Latino of any race were 2.43% of the population.

There were 368 households, out of which 32.1% had children under the age of 18 living with them, 48.9% were married couples living together, 13.6% had a female householder with no husband present, and 32.9% were non-families. 29.9% of all households were made up of individuals, and 15.2% had someone living alone who was 65 years of age or older. The average household size was 2.35 and the average family size was 2.90.

In the village, the population was spread out, with 27.6% under the age of 18, 8.8% from 18 to 24, 25.0% from 25 to 44, 22.1% from 45 to 64, and 16.5% who were 65 years of age or older. The median age was 36 years. For every 100 females, there were 96.6 males. For every 100 females age 18 and over, there were 91.1 males.

The median income for a household in the village was $28,859, and the median income for a family was $37,500. Males had a median income of $32,333 versus $20,952 for females. The per capita income for the village was $14,490. About 12.1% of families and 15.2% of the population were below the poverty line, including 26.8% of those under age 18 and 5.2% of those age 65 or over.

== Notable people ==
- Joe Magidsohn, American football player and official

== See also ==
- List of villages in Michigan
