= Tawas City, Michigan =

- City
- City of Tawas City
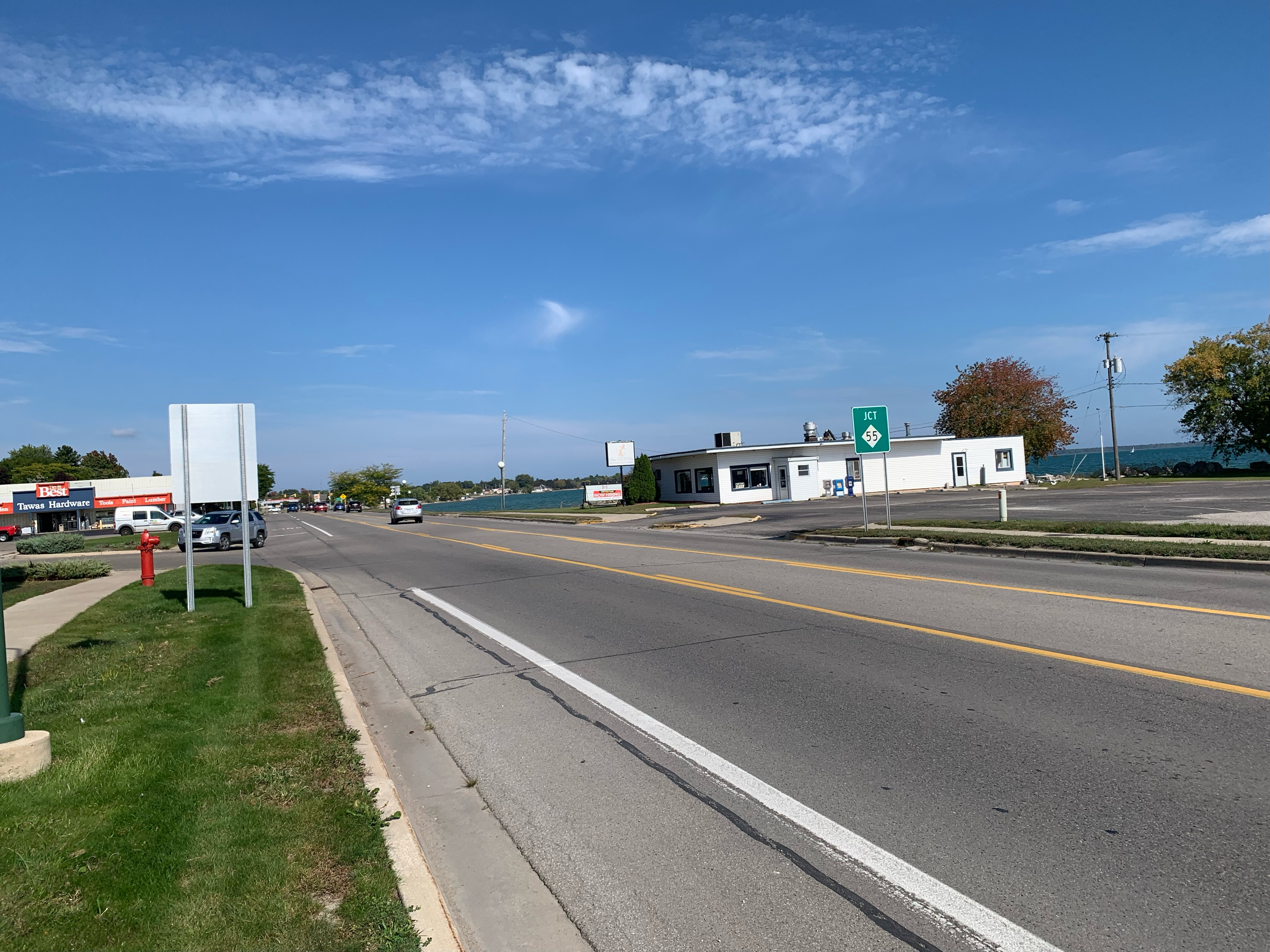
- US 23 through Tawas City

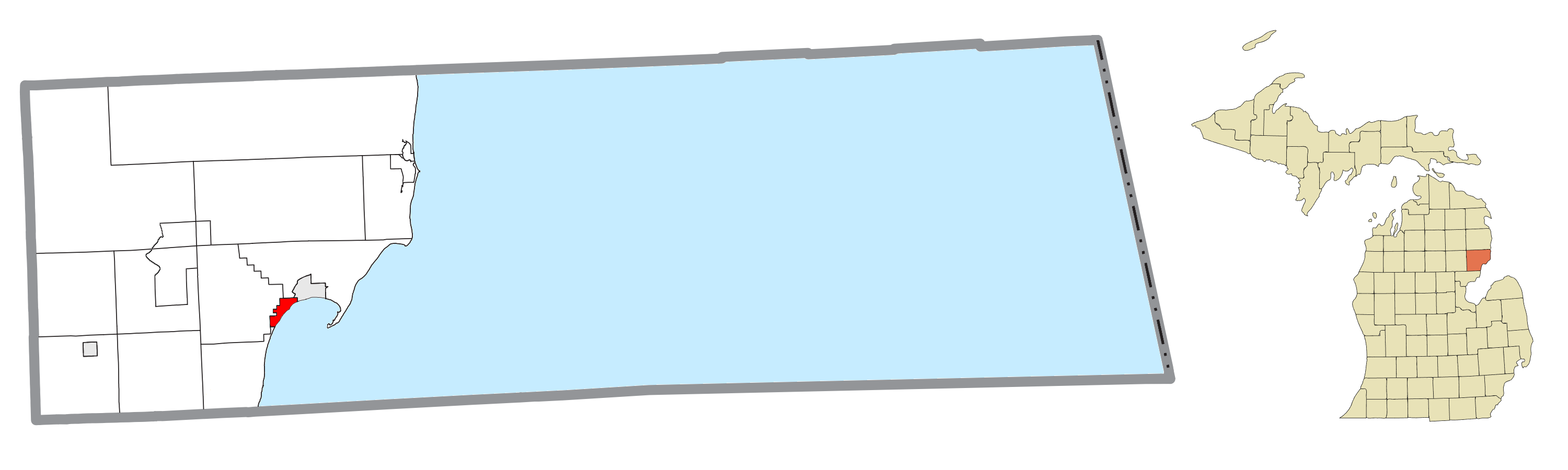
- Location within Iosco County

- Location within the state of Michigan Location within the United States
- Coordinates: 44°16′12″N 83°31′15″W
- Country: United States
- State: Michigan
- County: Iosco
- Settled: 1854
- Incorporated: 1885 (village); 1895 (city)

Government
  - Type: Council–manager
  - Mayor: Jackie Masich
  - Clerk: Michelle Westcott
  - Manager: Annge Horning
  - City council: Members: Jackie Masich; Chuck Klenow; Brad Huebel; Ed Nagy; Michael Russo; Jerry Malone; David Lesinski

Area
  - Total: 2.13 sq mi (5.51 km^{2})
  - Land: 1.70 sq mi (4.40 km^{2})
  - Water: 0.43 sq mi (1.11 km^{2})
- Elevation: 590 ft (180 m)

Population (2020)
  - Total: 1,834
  - Density: 1,079.3/sq mi (416.71/km^{2})
- Time zone: UTC-5 (Eastern (EST))
  - Summer (DST): UTC-4 (EDT)
- ZIP codes: 48763, 48764
- Area code: 989
- FIPS code: 26-78140
- GNIS feature ID: 1614605
- Website: Official website

Tawas City (/ˈtaʊwɑːs/ TOW-wahss) is a city in and the county seat of Iosco County in the U.S. state of Michigan. The population was 1,834 at the 2020 census. The city is mostly surrounded by Tawas Township, but the two areas are administered autonomously.

== History ==
Tawas City was founded in 1854 as the first city to be located on the shores of Saginaw Bay and Lake Huron north of Bay City, Michigan. Tawas City was designated as the county seat of Iosco County, and the first post office was established Jan. 6, 1856, with James O. Whittemore appointed postmaster.

Since Tawas City's founding, the community's economy has been a major factor influencing land use and development patterns. The rich natural resource base of the area: forest lands, Lake Huron and wildlife, combined with the protection offered by Tawas Bay, inspired the founding of the city and provided resources to support a lumber industry. The shoreline, as the transition zone between land and water, became the focus of the community, with the city developing in a linear fashion along the bayshore. Tawas Bay continues to serve as a harbor of refuge, used by large freighters to escape severe storms on Lake Huron.

Statements that “Tawas” is derived from the word “Ottawas” and that the Ottawa Indians once inhabited this region are false. The local Indians had made camps along the shore of the bay and near the mouth of the river. They were a band from the Saginaw, Michigan tribe of Chippewa (also known as Ojibwa). Their leader was Chief O-ta-was. As he had his camp on the shores of the bay, it was known as O-ta-was's Bay. Early map makers dropped in an extra “t"; later map makers dropped off the “s.” The name of the point dividing the bay from Lake Huron was known as Ottawa Point. Comparatively recent spelling and pronunciation for the name of these Chippewa gradually evolved to Tawas.

The Whittemores named the community they founded as Tawas City. Eight years later, the lumbering firm of Smith, Van Valkenburg and Company built a mill on the bay shore a mile or so east of the Whittemore mill and holding. When a community developed around this latter mill, the cluster of homes was, by common consent, named East Tawas. For many years, residents of both towns and the surrounding farming community often referred to Tawas City as “old town” and to East Tawas as “east town.”

== Geography ==
According to the U.S. Census Bureau, the city has a total area of 2.13 square miles (5.52 km^{2}), of which 1.70 square miles (4.40 km^{2}) is land and 0.43 square miles (1.11 km^{2}) (20.19%) is water.

== Demographics ==
Historical population
Census	Pop.	Note	%±
1880	712		—
1890	1,544		116.9%
1900	1,228		−20.5%
1910	1,061		−13.6%
1920	1,018		−4.1%
1930	1,034		1.6%
1940	1,075		4.0%
1950	1,441		34.0%
1960	1,810		25.6%
1970	1,666		−8.0%
1980	1,967		18.1%
1990	2,009		2.1%
2000	2,005		−0.2%
2010	1,827		−8.9%
2020	1,834		0.4%
U.S. Decennial Census

=== 2020 census ===
As of the 2020 census, Tawas City had a population of 1,834. The median age was 49.3 years. 17.4% of residents were under the age of 18 and 28.4% of residents were 65 years of age or older. For every 100 females there were 90.1 males, and for every 100 females age 18 and over there were 89.0 males age 18 and over.

98.6% of residents lived in urban areas, while 1.4% lived in rural areas.

There were 778 households in Tawas City, of which 23.0% had children under the age of 18 living in them. Of all households, 40.9% were married-couple households, 18.4% were households with a male householder and no spouse or partner present, and 31.6% were households with a female householder and no spouse or partner present. About 36.4% of all households were made up of individuals and 18.3% had someone living alone who was 65 years of age or older.

There were 970 housing units, of which 19.8% were vacant. The homeowner vacancy rate was 2.5% and the rental vacancy rate was 7.2%.

Racial composition as of the 2020 census
Race	Number	Percent
White	1,672	91.2%
Black or African American	23	1.3%
American Indian and Alaska Native	9	0.5%
Asian	24	1.3%
Native Hawaiian and Other Pacific Islander	0	0.0%
Some other race	15	0.8%
Two or more races	91	5.0%
Hispanic or Latino (of any race)	41	2.2%

=== 2010 census ===
As of the census of 2010, there were 1,827 people, 723 households, and 441 families residing in the city. The population density was 1,062.2 inhabitants per square mile (410.1/km^{2}). There were 977 housing units at an average density of 568.0 per square mile (219.3/km^{2}). The racial makeup of the city was 96.9% White, 0.7% African American, 0.2% Native American, 0.9% Asian, 0.4% from other races, and 0.8% from two or more races. Hispanic or Latino of any race were 1.4% of the population.

There were 723 households, of which 23.8% had children under the age of 18 living with them, 45.1% were married couples living together, 11.9% had a female householder with no husband present, 4.0% had a male householder with no wife present, and 39.0% were non-families. 34.4% of all households were made up of individuals, and 14.9% had someone living alone who was 65 years of age or older. The average household size was 2.22 and the average family size was 2.79.

The median age in the city was 47.4 years. 17.9% of residents were under the age of 18; 8.6% were between the ages of 18 and 24; 20.3% were from 25 to 44; 28.6% were from 45 to 64; and 24.6% were 65 years of age or older. The gender makeup of the city was 47.1% male and 52.9% female.

=== 2000 census ===
As of the census of 2000, there were 2,005 people, 760 households, and 484 families residing in the city. The population density was 1,174.4 inhabitants per square mile (453.4/km^{2}). There were 969 housing units at an average density of 567.6 per square mile (219.2/km^{2}). The racial makeup of the city was 97.31% White, 0.55% African American, 0.50% Native American, 0.65% Asian, 0.30% from other races, and 0.70% from two or more races. Hispanic or Latino of any race were 0.80% of the population.

There were 760 households, out of which 26.6% had children under the age of 18 living with them, 49.2% were married couples living together, 10.7% had a female householder with no husband present, and 36.3% were non-families. 32.2% of all households were made up of individuals, and 17.5% had someone living alone who was 65 years of age or older. The average household size was 2.29 and the average family size was 2.87.

In the city, the population was spread out, with 21.5% under the age of 18, 5.7% from 18 to 24, 23.6% from 25 to 44, 21.0% from 45 to 64, and 28.1% who were 65 years of age or older. The median age was 44 years. For every 100 females, there were 87.9 males. For every 100 females age 18 and over, there were 84.5 males.

The median income for a household in the city was $32,813, and the median income for a family was $37,235. Males had a median income of $28,789 versus $24,563 for females. The per capita income for the city was $16,061. About 8.8% of families and 9.6% of the population were below the poverty line, including 9.6% of those under age 18 and 11.0% of those age 65 or over.

== Transportation ==
=== Major highways ===
- US 23 has been designated the Sunrise Side Coastal Highway and runs along the Lake Huron shoreline.
- M-55 has its eastern terminus at US 23 in Tawas City.

=== Bus ===
- Indian Trails has a station in Tawas City that is along the Owosso–St. Ignace route that follows U.S. Highway 23 at this point.

== Local attractions ==
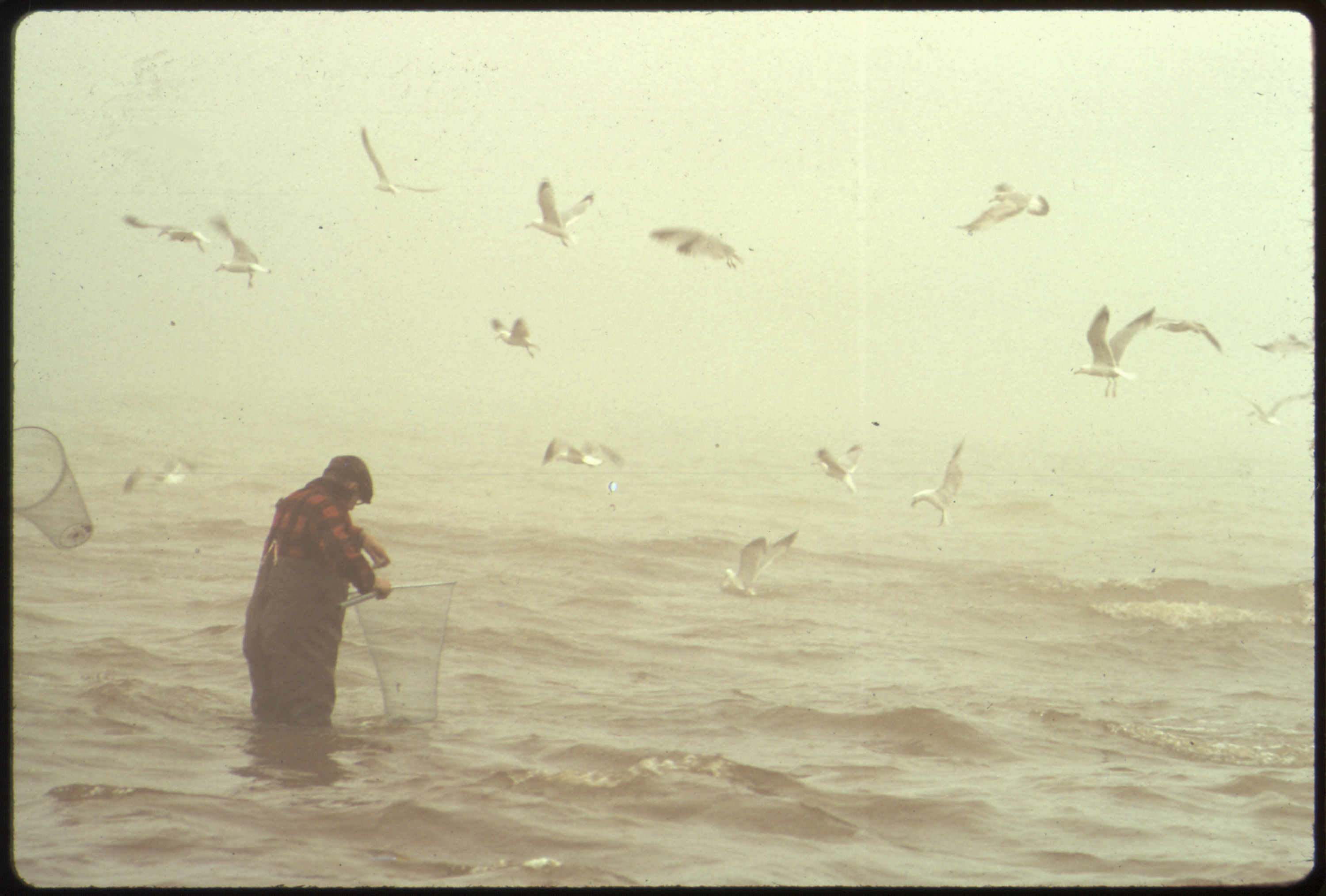
Smelt run in 1973

The city is on Tawas Bay, and Tawas Point State Park is located in nearby Baldwin Township. Both are considered to be an especially good locale for birding. and are listed as Important bird areas. It is said to be the most important "migrant trap" in the Saginaw Bay area. A fairly complete list of migratory birds that frequent the area is available. In more recent years Tawas Point has been a top kite-boarding destination.

== Education ==
The city is served by Tawas Area Schools.

Emanuel Lutheran School is a private parochial elementary school in Tawas City, serving approximately 70 students in grades K-8. It is affiliated with the Wisconsin Evangelical Lutheran Synod.

== Media ==
=== Newspapers ===
- The Iosco County News-Herald is the newspaper of record for Iosco County and has an office in Oscoda.
- The Oscoda Press is a weekly newspaper that serves the surrounding area.

=== Radio ===
- WIOS (1480 AM) - Adult standards
- WQLB (103.3 FM) - Classic hits
- WKJC (104.7 FM) - Country
- WTZM (106.1 FM) - Hot AC

=== Television ===
Tawas City and Iosco County are part of the Flint-Saginaw-Bay City television market; Charter Communications, the cable system serving Iosco County, offers most major channels from that market, along with Alpena's CBS affiliate, WBKB-TV, as well as CBC Television programming from CBMT in Montreal.
