= Kinde, Michigan =

- Village
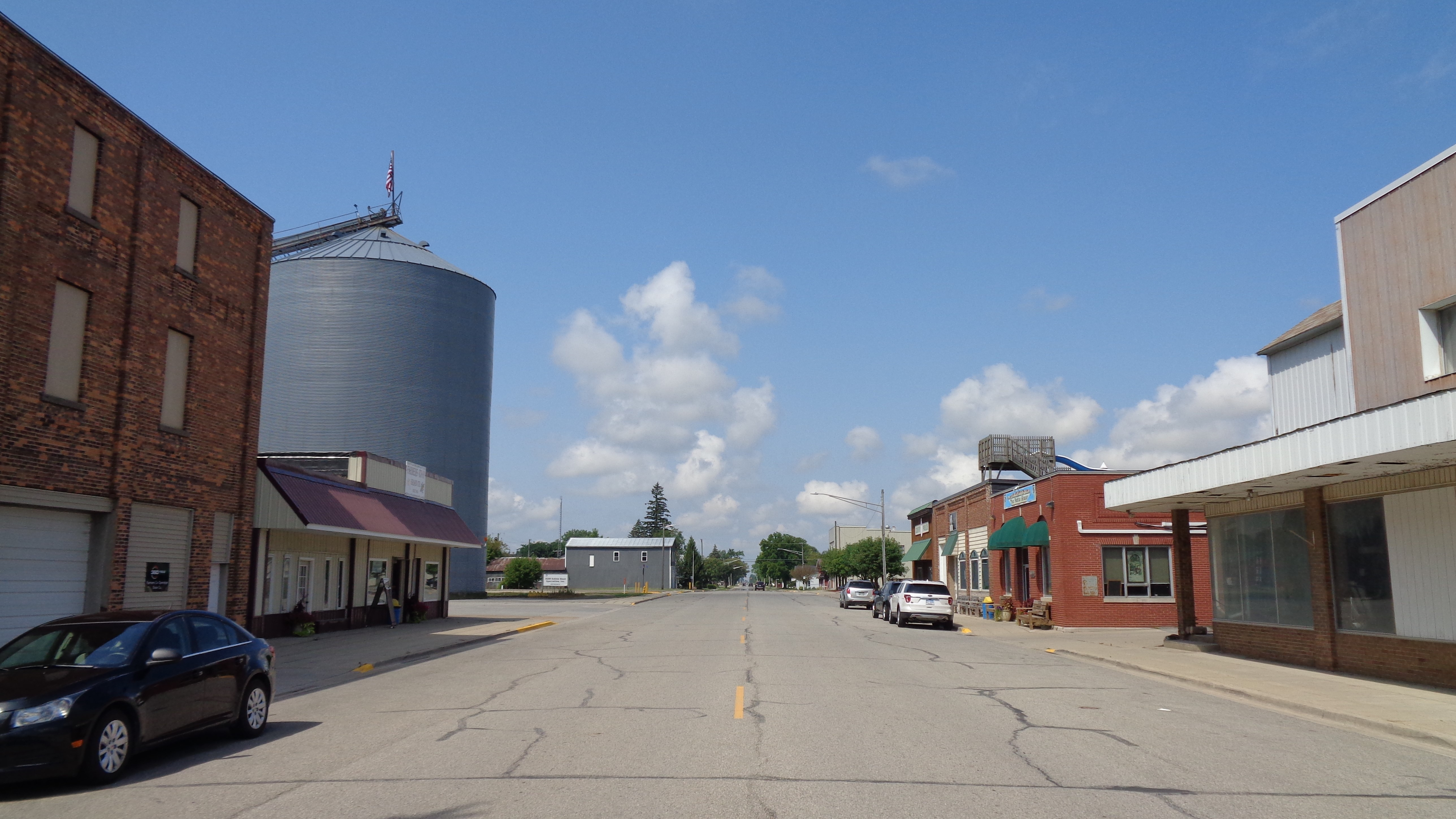
- The village of Kinde along Main Street

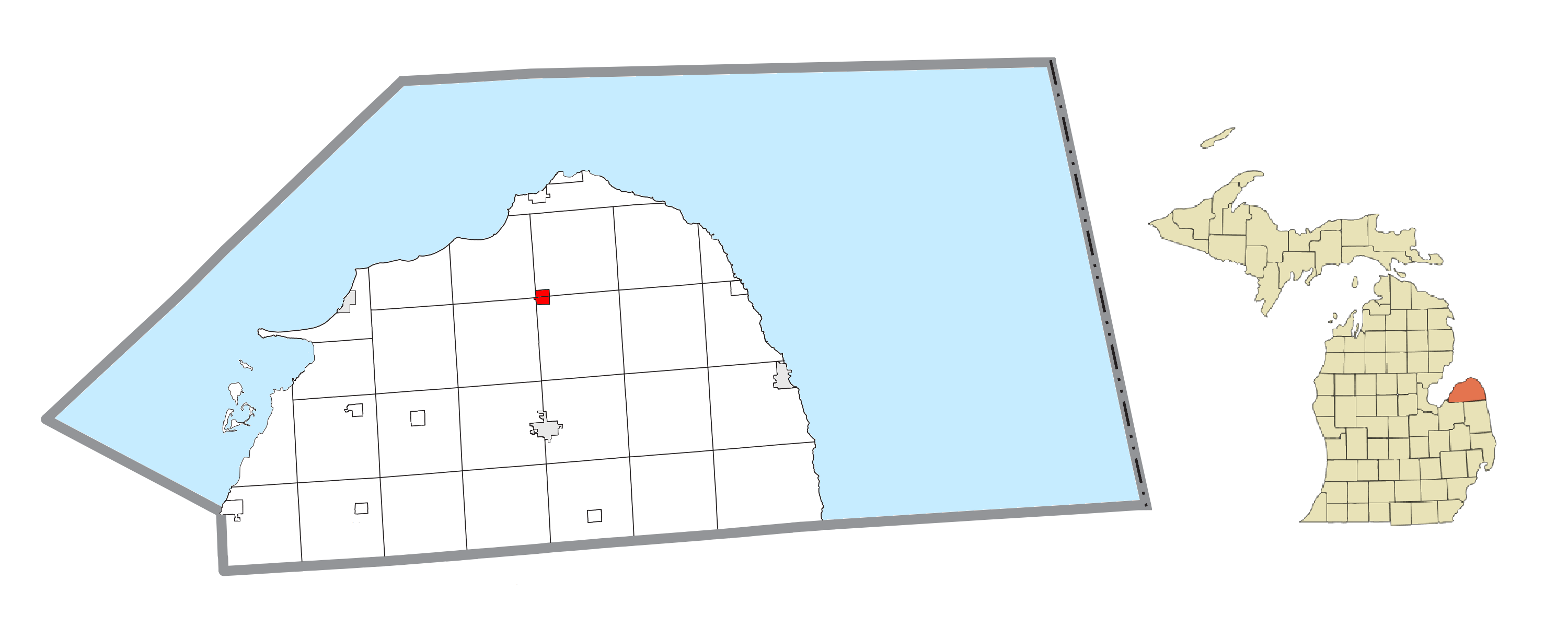
- Location within Huron County

- Location within the state of Michigan
- Coordinates: 43°56′20″N 82°59′48″W
- Country: United States
- State: Michigan
- County: Huron
- Townships: Dwight, Lincoln, and Meade

Area
  - Total: 1.19 sq mi (3.09 km^{2})
  - Land: 1.18 sq mi (3.05 km^{2})
  - Water: 0.015 sq mi (0.04 km^{2})
- Elevation: 699 ft (213 m)

Population (2020)
  - Total: 421
  - Density: 358.0/sq mi (138.22/km^{2})
- Time zone: UTC-5 (Eastern (EST))
  - Summer (DST): UTC-4 (EDT)
- ZIP code(s): 48445
- Area code: 989
- FIPS code: 26-43220
- GNIS feature ID: 0629684

Kinde is a village in Huron County in the U.S. state of Michigan. As of the 2020 census, Kinde had a population of 421.

The village is located on the boundary between Dwight Township and Lincoln Township, with about half of the village in both. A small portion of the village is within Meade Township.

== History ==
Businessman John Kinde arrived in Michigan's central Thumb area in the early 1880s and established a general store, lumber yard, grain elevator and post office. Train service began in 1882 with the construction of track by the Port Huron and Northwestern Railroad.

Kinde was renowned as the "bean capital of the world." Michigan bean soup has been a staple for over one hundred years in the U.S. Senate dining room in the form of Senate bean soup. However, the Michigan Bean Festival on Labor Day weekend is held in nearby Fairgrove.

The village is home to the St. Peter's Lutheran Church.

== Geography ==
According to the United States Census Bureau, the village has a total area of 1.19 square miles (3.08 km^{2}), of which 1.18 square miles (3.06 km^{2}) is land and 0.01 square miles (0.03 km^{2}) is water.

== Demographics ==
Historical population
Census	Pop.	Note	%±
1910	300		—
1920	420		40.0%
1930	412		−1.9%
1940	503		22.1%
1950	571		13.5%
1960	624		9.3%
1970	618		−1.0%
1980	600		−2.9%
1990	473		−21.2%
2000	534		12.9%
2010	448		−16.1%
2020	421		−6.0%
U.S. Decennial Census

=== 2010 census ===
As of the census of 2010, there were 448 people, 195 households, and 114 families living in the village. The population density was 379.7 inhabitants per square mile (146.6/km^{2}). There were 223 housing units at an average density of 189.0 per square mile (73.0/km^{2}). The racial makeup of the village was 96.4% White, 1.8% Native American, 0.9% Asian, 0.2% from other races, and 0.7% from two or more races. Hispanic or Latino of any race were 0.9% of the population.

There were 195 households, of which 30.3% had children under the age of 18 living with them, 42.6% were married couples living together, 12.3% had a female householder with no husband present, 3.6% had a male householder with no wife present, and 41.5% were non-families. 33.3% of all households were made up of individuals, and 17.4% had someone living alone who was 65 years of age or older. The average household size was 2.30 and the average family size was 2.92.

The median age in the village was 40 years. 25.2% of residents were under the age of 18; 6.4% were between the ages of 18 and 24; 25% were from 25 to 44; 25.3% were from 45 to 64; and 18.1% were 65 years of age or older. The gender makeup of the village was 50.4% male and 49.6% female.

=== 2000 census ===
As of the census of 2000, there were 534 people, 209 households, and 145 families living in the village. The population density was 530.2 inhabitants per square mile (204.7/km^{2}). There were 226 housing units at an average density of 224.4 per square mile (86.6/km^{2}). The racial makeup of the village was 97.19% White, 0.37% African American, 0.37% Native American, 0.56% Asian, and 1.50% from two or more races. Hispanic or Latino of any race were 0.19% of the population.

There were 209 households, out of which 36.4% had children under the age of 18 living with them, 51.7% were married couples living together, 11.0% had a female householder with no husband present, and 30.6% were non-families. 27.8% of all households were made up of individuals, and 16.7% had someone living alone who was 65 years of age or older. The average household size was 2.55 and the average family size was 3.10.

In the village, the population was spread out, with 29.6% under the age of 18, 8.6% from 18 to 24, 28.5% from 25 to 44, 16.9% from 45 to 64, and 16.5% who were 65 years of age or older. The median age was 34 years. For every 100 females, there were 85.4 males. For every 100 females age 18 and over, there were 87.1 males.

The median income for a household in the village was $29,125, and the median income for a family was $34,107. Males had a median income of $27,708 versus $14,167 for females. The per capita income for the village was $12,623. About 12.6% of families and 14.6% of the population were below the poverty line, including 21.8% of those under age 18 and 9.9% of those age 65 or over.

== Local events ==
The "Kinde Polka Fest" is held every year in downtown Kinde.
