= Lincoln Township, Huron County, Michigan =

Lincoln Township, Michigan
- Civil township
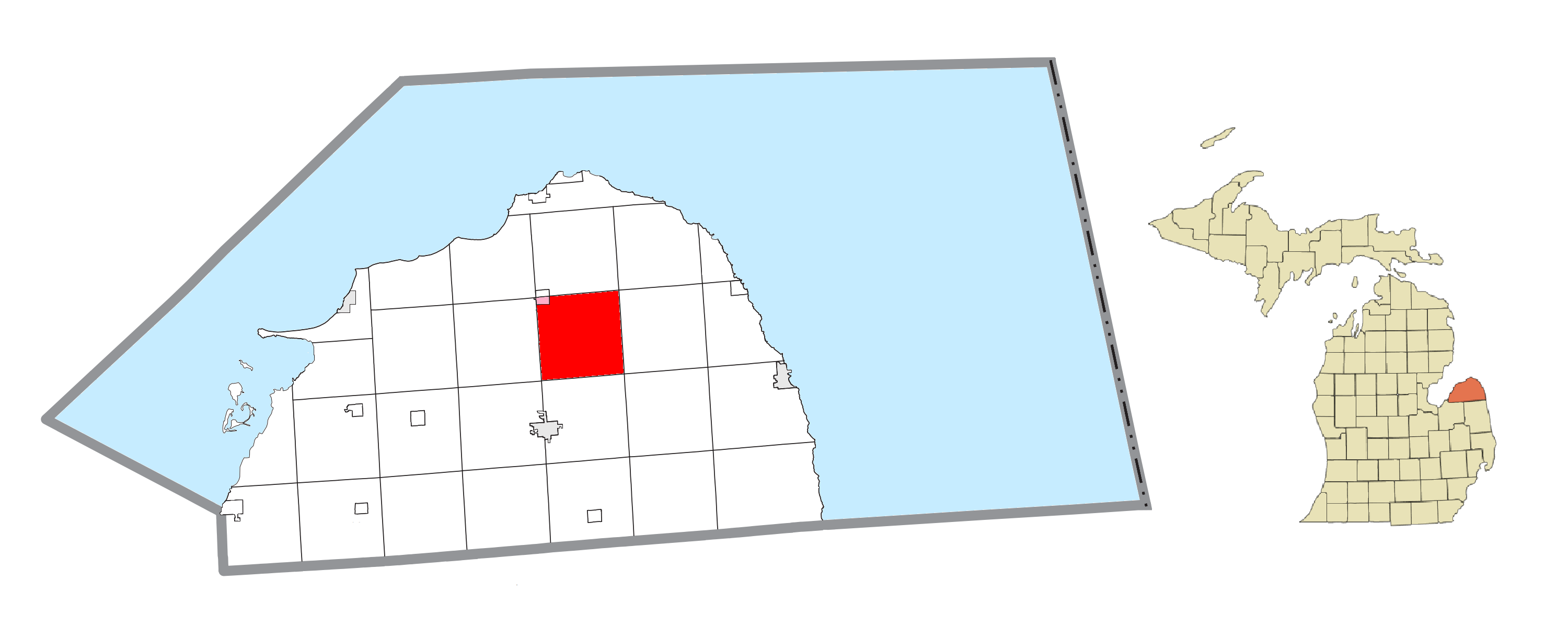
- Location within Huron County (red) and an administered portion of the Kinde village (pink)

- Location within the state of Michigan Lincoln Township (the United States)
- Coordinates: 43°54′02″N 82°57′34″W
- Country: United States
- State: Michigan
- County: Huron

Area
  - Total: 35.8 sq mi (92.7 km^{2})
  - Land: 35.8 sq mi (92.6 km^{2})
  - Water: 0 sq mi (0.0 km^{2})
- Elevation: 728 ft (222 m)

Population (2020)
  - Total: 727
  - Density: 20.3/sq mi (7.85/km^{2})
- Time zone: UTC-5 (Eastern (EST))
  - Summer (DST): UTC-4 (EDT)
- ZIP code(s): 48413, 48432, 48445
- Area code: 989
- FIPS code: 26-47640
- GNIS feature ID: 1626621

Lincoln Township is a civil township of Huron County in the U.S. state of Michigan. The population was 727 at the 2020 census.

== Communities ==
- Kinde is a village on the boundary between Lincoln Township and Dwight Township with about half of the village in both. A small portion of the village is within Meade Township.
- Filion is an unincorporated community located on the border with Meade Township at M-53 and Filion Road at coordinates 43°53′44″N 83°00′13″W. The ZIP code is 48432.
- Rapson is an unincorporated community on the southeast corner of the Township.

== Geography ==
According to the United States Census Bureau, the township has a total area of 35.8 square miles (93 km^{2}), of which 35.8 square miles (93 km^{2}) is land and 0.04 square miles (0.10 km^{2}) (0.06%) is water.

== Demographics ==
As of the census of 2000, there were 873 people, 335 households, and 248 families residing in the township. The population density was 24.4 inhabitants per square mile (9.4/km^{2}). There were 370 housing units at an average density of 10.3 per square mile (4.0/km^{2}). The racial makeup of the township was 98.17% White, 0.23% African American, 0.34% Asian, and 1.26% from two or more races. Hispanic or Latino of any race were 0.11% of the population.

There were 335 households, out of which 31.3% had children under the age of 18 living with them, 63.3% were married couples living together, 7.2% had a female householder with no husband present, and 25.7% were non-families. 20.6% of all households were made up of individuals, and 11.3% had someone living alone who was 65 years of age or older. The average household size was 2.59 and the average family size was 3.00.

In the township the population was spread out, with 26.0% under the age of 18, 6.3% from 18 to 24, 28.9% from 25 to 44, 24.5% from 45 to 64, and 14.3% who were 65 years of age or older. The median age was 38 years. For every 100 females, there were 100.7 males. For every 100 females age 18 and over, there were 102.5 males.

The median income for a household in the township was $36,250, and the median income for a family was $43,625. Males had a median income of $30,625 versus $20,089 for females. The per capita income for the township was $16,145. About 8.2% of families and 10.4% of the population were below the poverty line, including 8.9% of those under age 18 and 11.1% of those age 65 or over.
