= WLEW-FM =

Coordinates: 43.891°N 83.124°W

- Bad Axe, Michigan; United States
- Broadcast area: The Thumb
- Frequency: 102.1 MHz
- Branding: Cruise 102.1

Programming
- Format: Classic hits/adult contemporary mix
- Affiliations: AP Radio

Ownership
- Owner: Thumb Broadcasting
- Sister stations: WLEW

History
- First air date: 1967

Technical information
- Licensing authority: FCC
- Facility ID: 67046
- Class: C2
- ERP: 50,000 watts
- HAAT: 150 meters (490 ft)

Links
- Public license information: Public file; LMS
- Webcast: Listen live
- Website: thumbnet.net/index.php

WLEW-FM (102.1 FM) is a radio station in Bad Axe, Michigan, United States, serving the Thumb area of Michigan with an adult hits format. It is owned by Thumb Broadcasting and broadcasts from studios on South Van Dyke Road in Bad Axe.

In 1966, John Wismer, owner of WLEW 1340, applied for and received a license to add an FM station at 92.1 MHz. This station would become WLEW-FM, a 3,000-watt easy listening music station which moved to the current 102.1 MHz in 1990, with WIDL in Caro, which had been at 104.9, taking the 92.1 frequency. Both stations were sold by Wismer in 1971 to A. Arthur Aymen, who continued to do business as Thumb Broadcasting. In 1993, control of ownership was transferred to Aymen's sons, Richard and Matthew, who continued to own and operate the stations for the next three decades. The Aymen family sold Thumb Broadcasting to Joshua Anaman, a sales representative at the stations, in July 2025.

Unusual for small-town radio stations, WLEW-FM is locally programmed and does not rely on satellite feeds for any of their music programming. As of May 2026, local talent on the station includes morning/midday host Scott Mrozek, afternoon host John Curdie, evening host Gabriel Del Rosario, overnight announcer/news reporter Mike Kaufman, news director Russ Survance, and "Wolfman Mac" Kelly, who hosts the station's all-request Classic Flashback program on Saturday nights.

== Sources ==
- Michiguide.com - WLEW-FM History
