= WQLB =

Radio station in Tawas City, Michigan

WQLB and WKJZ

WQLB: Tawas City, Michigan; WKJZ: Hillman, Michigan; United States
- Frequencies: WQLB: 103.3 MHz; WKJZ: 94.9 MHz
- Branding: Hits FM

Programming
- Format: Classic hits

Ownership
- Owner: Carroll Enterprises

History
- First air date: WQLB: July 9, 1997; WKJZ: December 14, 1993

Technical information
- Licensing authority: FCC
- Facility ID: WQLB: 51746; WKJZ: 9120
- Class: WQLB: C3; WKJZ: C2
- ERP: WQLB: 25,000 watts; WKJZ: 50,000 watts
- HAAT: WQLB: 129 meters (423 ft); WKJZ: 150 meters (490 ft)
- Transmitter coordinates: WQLB: 44°24′48″N 83°37′14″W; WKJZ: 45°01′15″N 83°55′21″W

Links
- Public license information: WQLB: Public file; LMS; WKJZ: Public file; LMS
- Webcast: Listen live
- Website: hitsfm.net

WQLB (103.3 FM Tawas City, Michigan) and WKJZ (94.9 FM Hillman, Michigan, serving the Alpena market) are a pair of radio stations known as "HITS FM". The station plays classic hits from the 1970s through the 1990s. It had broadcast a classic rock format ("B-Rock," partially satellite-fed from Jones Radio Networks) until May 2007, when it switched to its current classic hits format. Prior to "B-Rock," WKJZ 94.9 had been a simulcast of country sister station 104.7 WKJC.

Deb Michaels is the Hits FM weekday morning show host; Ron Pritchard is the midday host Monday-Friday from 10am-2pm, and Greg Morgan drives you home in the Afternoon Drive Monday-Friday 2pm-6pm.
