= Oliver Township, Huron County, Michigan =

Oliver Township, Michigan
- Civil township
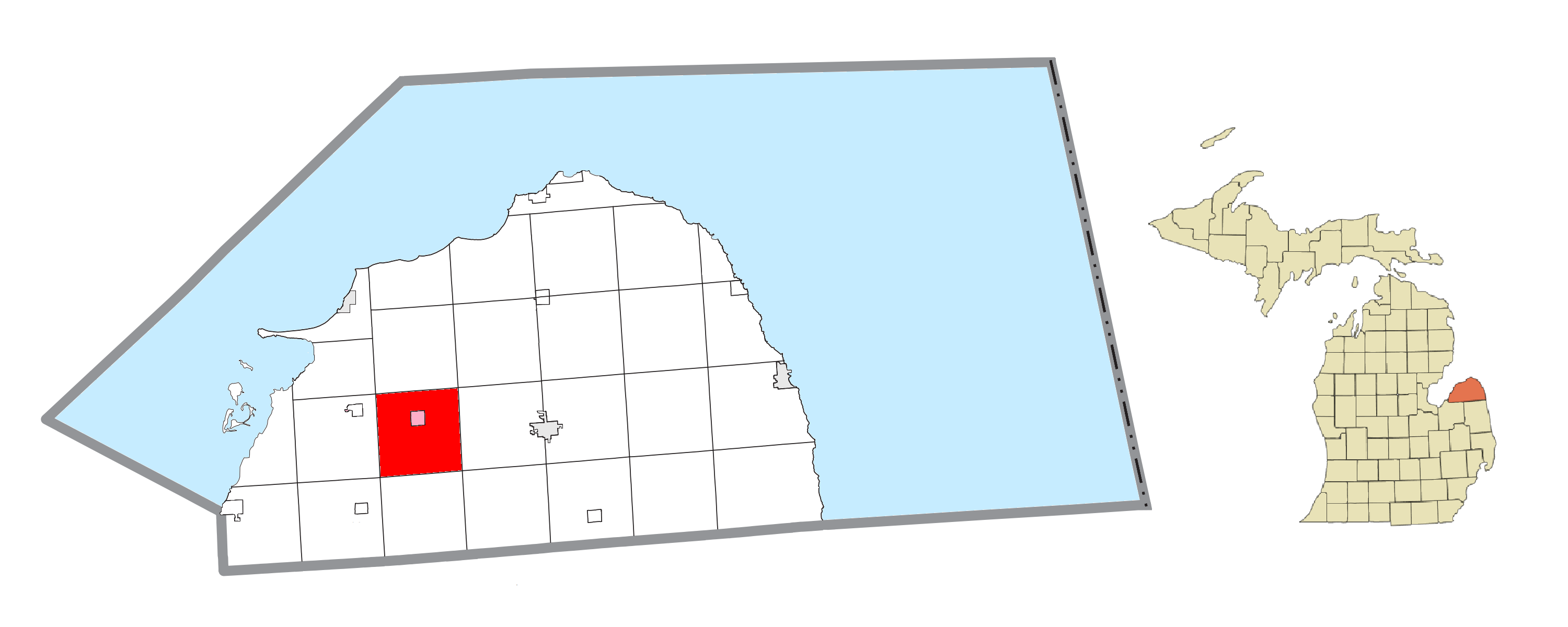
- Location within Huron County (red) and the administered village of Elkton (pink)

- Location within the state of Michigan Oliver Township (the United States)
- Coordinates: 43°48′56″N 83°10′49″W
- Country: United States
- State: Michigan
- County: Huron
- Organized: 1877

Government
  - Supervisor: Larry Krohn

Area
  - Total: 35.4 sq mi (91.6 km^{2})
  - Land: 35.3 sq mi (91.4 km^{2})
  - Water: 0.039 sq mi (0.1 km^{2})
- Elevation: 650 ft (198 m)

Population (2020)
  - Total: 1,419
  - Density: 40.2/sq mi (15.5/km^{2})
- Time zone: UTC-5 (Eastern (EST))
  - Summer (DST): UTC-4 (EDT)
- ZIP code(s): 48413, 48731, 48755
- Area code: 989
- FIPS code: 26-60520
- GNIS feature ID: 1626842
- Website: Official website

Oliver Township is a civil township of Huron County in the U.S. state of Michigan. The population was 1,419 at the 2020 census.

== History ==
Oliver Township was established in 1877.

== Communities ==
- Village of Elkton

== Geography ==
According to the United States Census Bureau, the township has a total area of 35.3 square miles (91.6 km^{2}), of which 35.3 square miles (91.5 km^{2}) is land and 0.1 square mile (0.1 km^{2}) (0.14%) is water.

== Demographics ==
As of the census of 2000, there were 1,626 people, 644 households, and 455 families residing in the township. The population density was 46.1 inhabitants per square mile (17.8/km^{2}). There were 690 housing units at an average density of 19.5 per square mile (7.5/km^{2}). The racial makeup of the township was 97.29% White, 0.25% African American, 0.31% Asian, 0.37% from other races, and 1.78% from two or more races. Hispanic or Latino of any race were 4.55% of the population.

There were 644 households, out of which 33.4% had children under the age of 18 living with them, 56.2% were married couples living together, 10.7% had a female householder with no husband present, and 29.2% were non-families. 25.8% of all households were made up of individuals, and 13.4% had someone living alone who was 65 years of age or older. The average household size was 2.48 and the average family size was 2.97.

In the township the population was spread out, with 27.7% under the age of 18, 7.4% from 18 to 24, 27.6% from 25 to 44, 22.9% from 45 to 64, and 14.5% who were 65 years of age or older. The median age was 35 years. For every 100 females, there were 100.2 males. For every 100 females age 18 and over, there were 95.0 males.

The median income for a household in the township was $32,315, and the median income for a family was $40,536. Males had a median income of $31,607 versus $20,000 for females. The per capita income for the township was $15,482. About 11.9% of families and 16.0% of the population were below the poverty line, including 25.1% of those under age 18 and 8.7% of those age 65 or over.

== Points of interest ==
- Harvest Wind Farm: Constructed in 2007, this wind farm contains 32 turbines on 3,200 acres of land capable of producing 52.8 MW of power.
