= WIOS =

Coordinates: 44°15′48″N 83°32′42″W

- Tawas City–East Tawas, Michigan; United States
- Frequency: 1480 kHz
- Branding: 1480 WIOS

Programming
- Format: News/Talk
- Affiliations: Michigan Radio Network

Ownership
- Owner: Carroll Enterprises

History
- First air date: 1958
- Call sign meaning: Iosco County

Technical information
- Licensing authority: FCC
- Class: D
- Power: 1,000 watts day; 109 watts night
- Translators: W295CU (106.9 MHz, Tawas City)

Links
- Public license information: Public file; LMS
- Webcast: Listen live
- Website: http://www.wiosradio.com/

WIOS (1480 AM) is a radio station broadcasting a format of talk. Licensed to Tawas City, Michigan, it first began broadcasting in 1958.

WIOS previously carried a full-service MOR format. On June 15, 2015, the station transitioned to an "All Talk" format, featuring national personalities such as Dave Ramsey and Sean Hannity.

== History ==
WIOS first began broadcasting on September 27, 1958, as the first and only AM radio station in Iosco County. The station was established by the Tawas Radio Company, with the call letters standing for Iosco County, the region it was built to serve. The station's original transmitter site was established along US-23, where it operated as a daytime-only station for much of its early history. In 1964, it became a prominent affiliate of the ABC Radio Network, serving as the "Sunrise Side's" primary source for national news and sports.

Since 1968, the station has been owned and operated by Carroll Broadcasting, a family-owned media group founded by John Carroll. This makes it the only Michigan-owned media company currently operating in Iosco County. Carroll, who previously served as the general manager for major stations in the Flint market like WKMH and WKMF, purchased WIOS as part of his expansion into the "Sunrise Side" of Michigan.
