= Meade Township, Huron County, Michigan =

Meade Township, Michigan
- Civil township
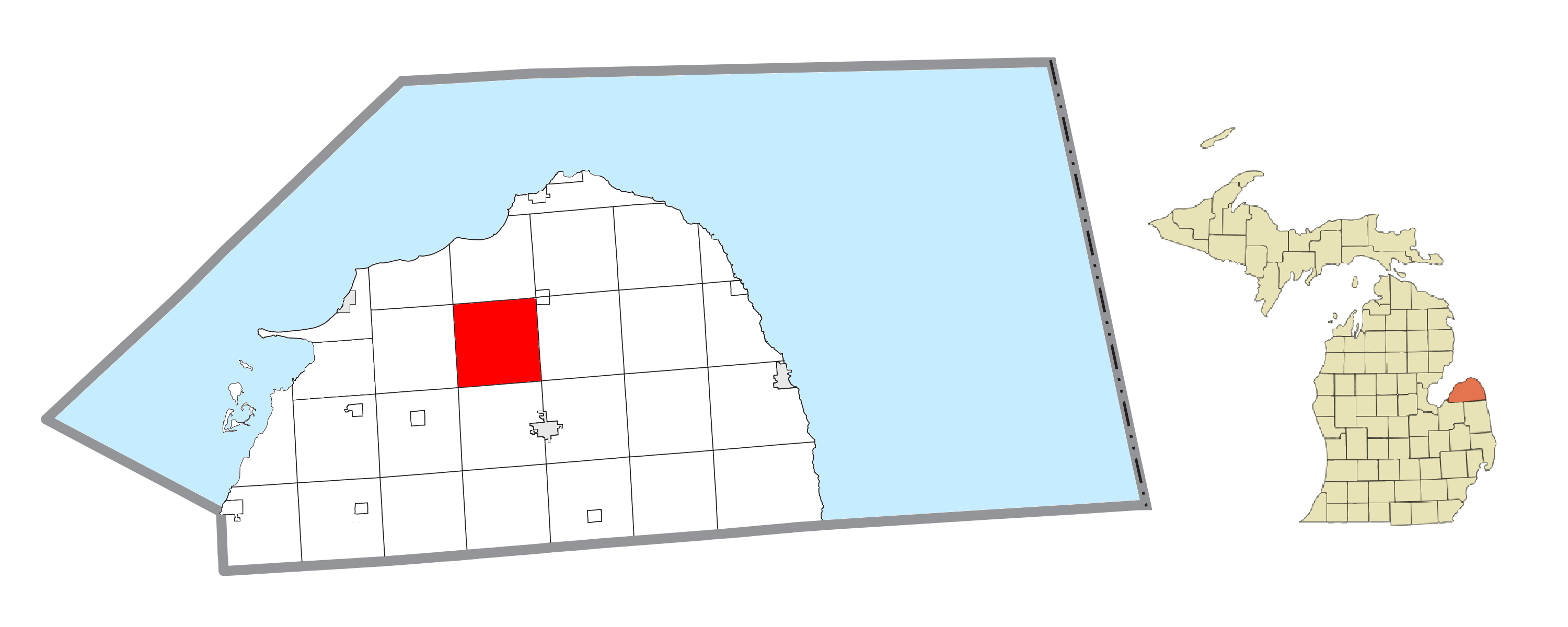
- Location within Huron County (red) and an administered portion of the Kinde village (pink)

- Location within the state of Michigan Meade Township (the United States)
- Coordinates: 43°53′39″N 83°03′39″W
- Country: United States
- State: Michigan
- County: Huron
- Established: 1869

Area
  - Total: 35.7 sq mi (92.4 km^{2})
  - Land: 35.7 sq mi (92.4 km^{2})
  - Water: 0 sq mi (0.0 km^{2})
- Elevation: 679 ft (207 m)

Population (2020)
  - Total: 698
  - Density: 19.6/sq mi (7.55/km^{2})
- Time zone: UTC-5 (Eastern (EST))
  - Summer (DST): UTC-4 (EDT)
- ZIP code(s): 48413, 48432, 48445, 48725, 48731
- Area code: 989
- FIPS code: 26-52600
- GNIS feature ID: 1626714

Meade Township is a civil township of Huron County in the U.S. state of Michigan. The population was 698 at the 2020 census.

Meade Township was established in 1869.

== Communities ==
- Crown was a rural post office in this township from 1899 until 1904.
- Kinde is a village on the boundary between Lincoln Township and Dwight townships, with about half of the village in both. A small portion of the village is within the township.
- Filion is an unincorporated community located on the border with Lincoln Township at M-53 and Filion Road at coordinates 43°53′44″N 83°00′13″W. The ZIP code is 48432.

== Geography ==
According to the United States Census Bureau, the township has a total area of 35.7 square miles (92.4 km^{2}), all land.

== Demographics ==
As of the census of 2000, there were 799 people, 304 households, and 234 families residing in the township. The population density was 22.4 inhabitants per square mile (8.6/km^{2}). There were 345 housing units at an average density of 9.7 per square mile (3.7/km^{2}). The racial makeup of the township was 99.25% White, and 0.75% from two or more races. Hispanic or Latino of any race were 0.63% of the population.

There were 304 households, out of which 33.9% had children under the age of 18 living with them, 63.5% were married couples living together, 7.2% had a female householder with no husband present, and 23.0% were non-families. 20.7% of all households were made up of individuals, and 10.9% had someone living alone who was 65 years of age or older. The average household size was 2.59 and the average family size was 2.97.

In the township the population was spread out, with 24.4% under the age of 18, 7.1% from 18 to 24, 27.5% from 25 to 44, 22.8% from 45 to 64, and 18.1% who were 65 years of age or older. The median age was 41 years. For every 100 females, there were 98.3 males. For every 100 females age 18 and over, there were 101.3 males.

The median income for a household in the township was $39,750, and the median income for a family was $43,417. Males had a median income of $30,337 versus $21,979 for females. The per capita income for the township was $17,126. About 3.3% of families and 6.6% of the population were below the poverty line, including 3.1% of those under age 18 and 6.8% of those age 65 or over.
