= WLEW (AM) =

WLEW and WHST

WLEW: Bad Axe, Michigan; WHST: Pigeon, Michigan; United States
- Broadcast area: The Thumb
- Frequencies: WLEW: 1340 kHz; WHST: 94.1 MHz
- Branding: The Thumb's Hottest Country

Programming
- Format: Country
- Affiliations: Associated Press; Brownfield Ag News; Spartan Sports Network

Ownership
- Owner: Thumb Broadcasting
- Sister stations: WLEW-FM

History
- First air date: WLEW: February 11, 1950; WHST: 2022

Technical information
- Licensing authority: FCC
- Facility ID: WLEW: 67045; WHST: 762368
- Class: WLEW: C; WHST: C3
- Power: WLEW: 1,000 watts
- ERP: WHST: 15,000 watts
- Transmitter coordinates: WLEW: 43°48′03″N 83°01′23″W

Links
- Public license information: WLEW: Public file; LMS; WHST: Public file; LMS
- Website: www.thumbnet.net

WLEW (1340 AM) is a radio station licensed to Bad Axe, Michigan, United States. with a power output of 1,000 watts, covering much of Huron County, Michigan. The station is owned by Thumb Broadcasting and broadcasts from studios on South Van Dyke Road in Bad Axe. Its country music format simulcast on the FM band by WHST, licensed to Pigeon, Michigan, at 94.1 MHz, with an effective radiated power of 15,000 watts.

== History ==
WLEW signed on February 11, 1950, at 1540 kHz with 250 watts of power under the ownership of the Saginaw Broadcasting Company. The station was purchased by the Stevens Wismer Broadcasting Company in 1953. Wismer also owned WHLS and WSAQ in Port Huron, WCSR in Hillsdale, and WLAV in Grand Rapids, among others. In 1955, the frequency changed to the current 1340 kHz and was licensed for unlimited operations. The station, still under Wismer's ownership, began doing business as Thumb Broadcasting in 1957. In 1960, the station was upgrade to 1,000 watts of power using a two-tower directional antenna array.

In 1966, Wismer applied for and received a license for WLEW to add an FM station at 92.1 MHz. This station would become WLEW-FM, which moved to the current 102.1 MHz in 1990. Both stations were sold by Wismer in 1971 to A. Arthur Aymen, who continued to do business as Thumb Broadcasting. In 1993, control of ownership was transferred to Aymen's sons, Richard and Matthew, who continued to own and operate the stations for the next three decades.

In 2021, Thumb Broadcasting was the highest bidder during a Federal Communications Commission frequency auction for a new FM license serving Pigeon, Michigan. Under the call letters WHST, the new station went on the air in late 2022 at 94.1 MHz, simulcasting WLEW's country format.The Aymen family sold Thumb Broadcasting to Joshua Anaman, a sales representative at the stations, in July 2025.

== Sources ==
- Michiguide.com - WLEW History
