= The Thumb =

Peninsula and region of Michigan

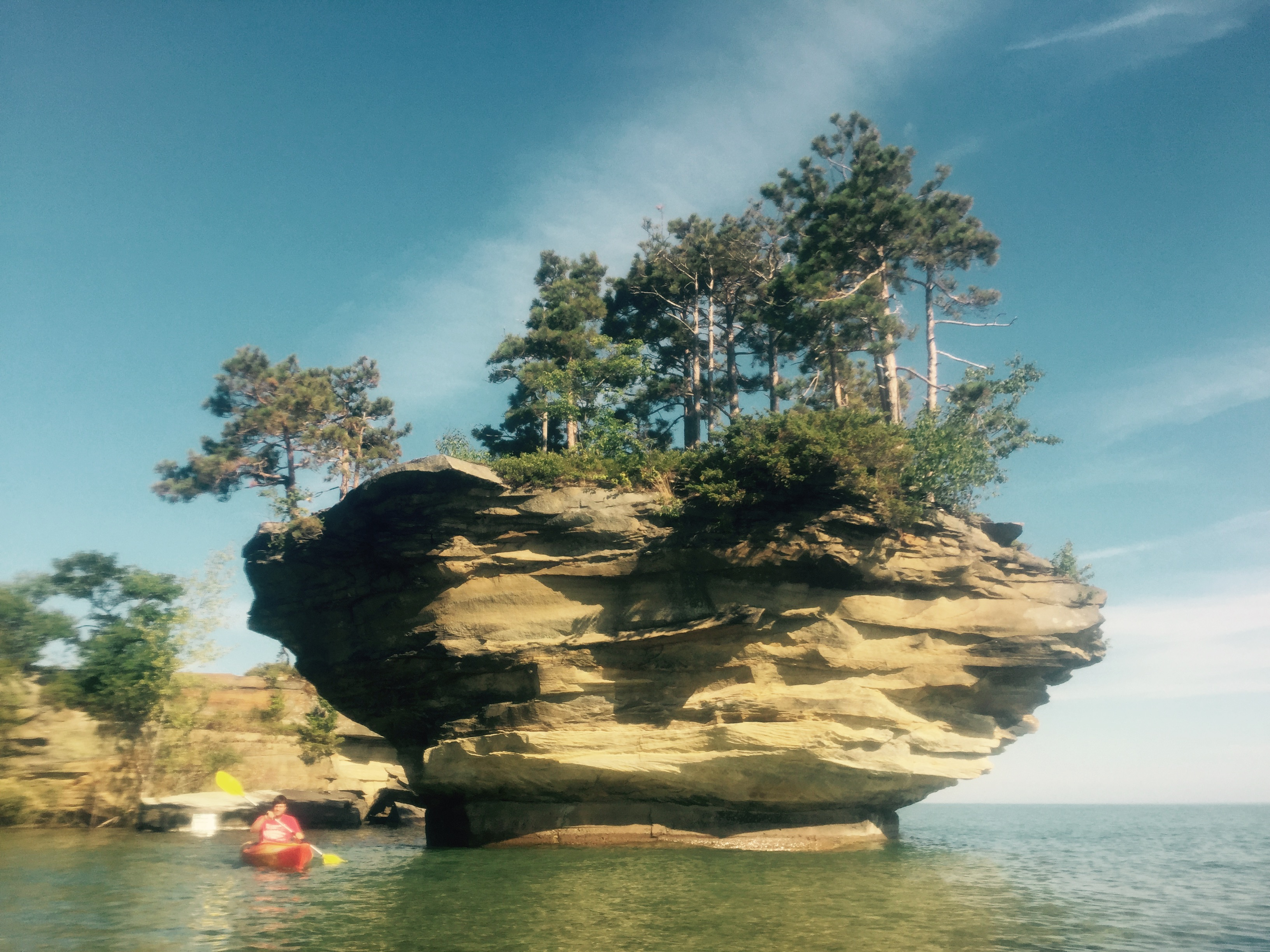
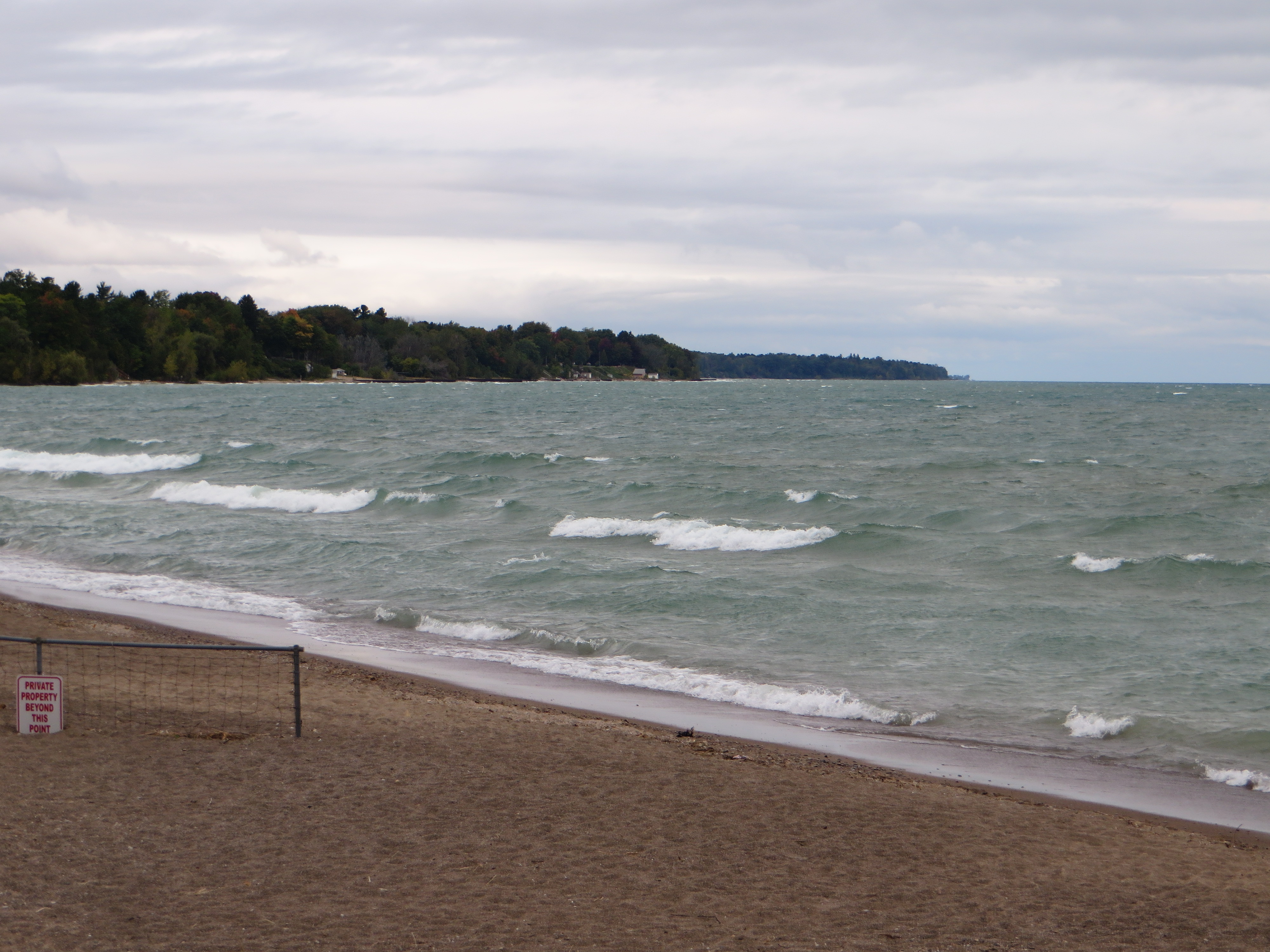
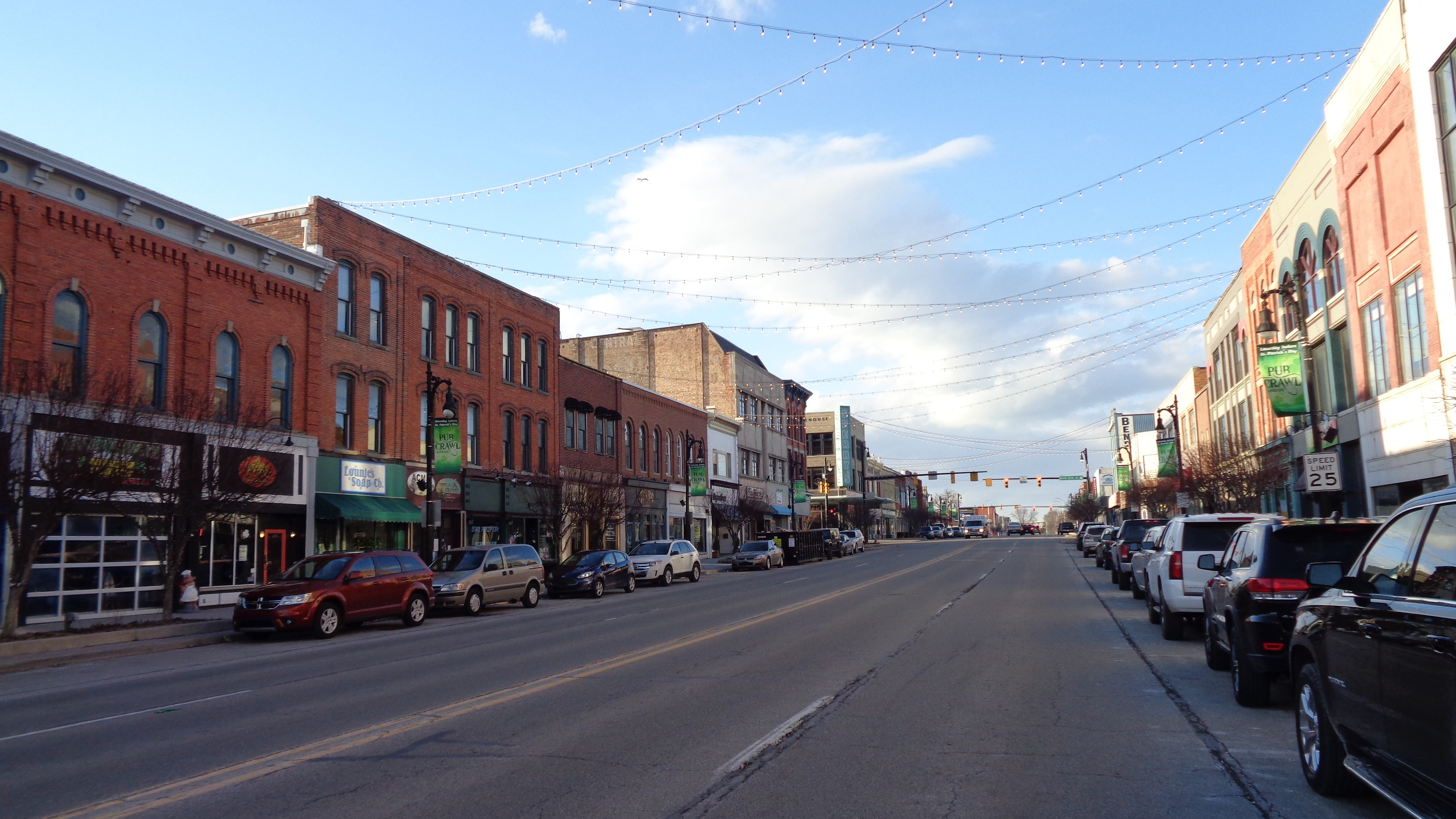
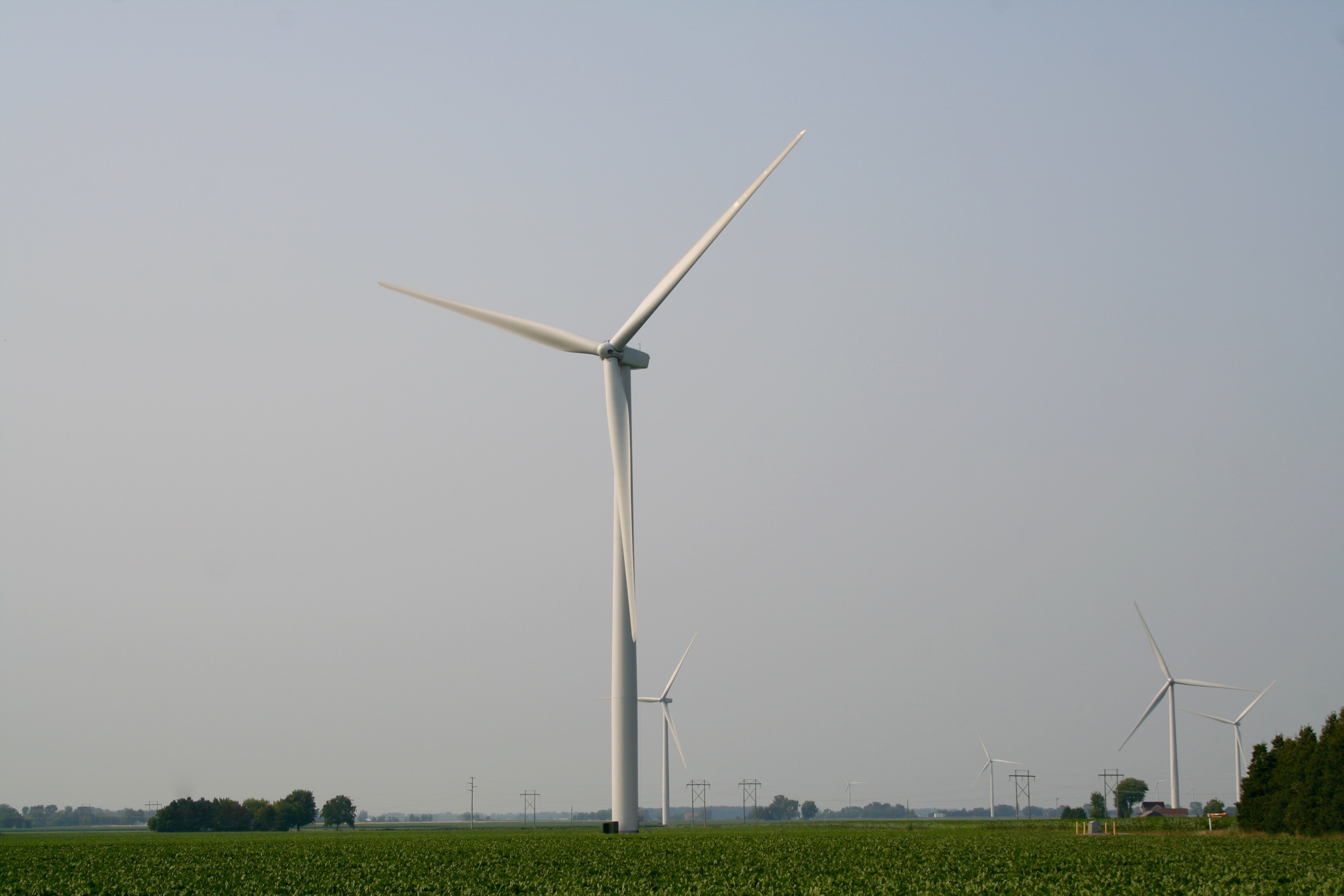
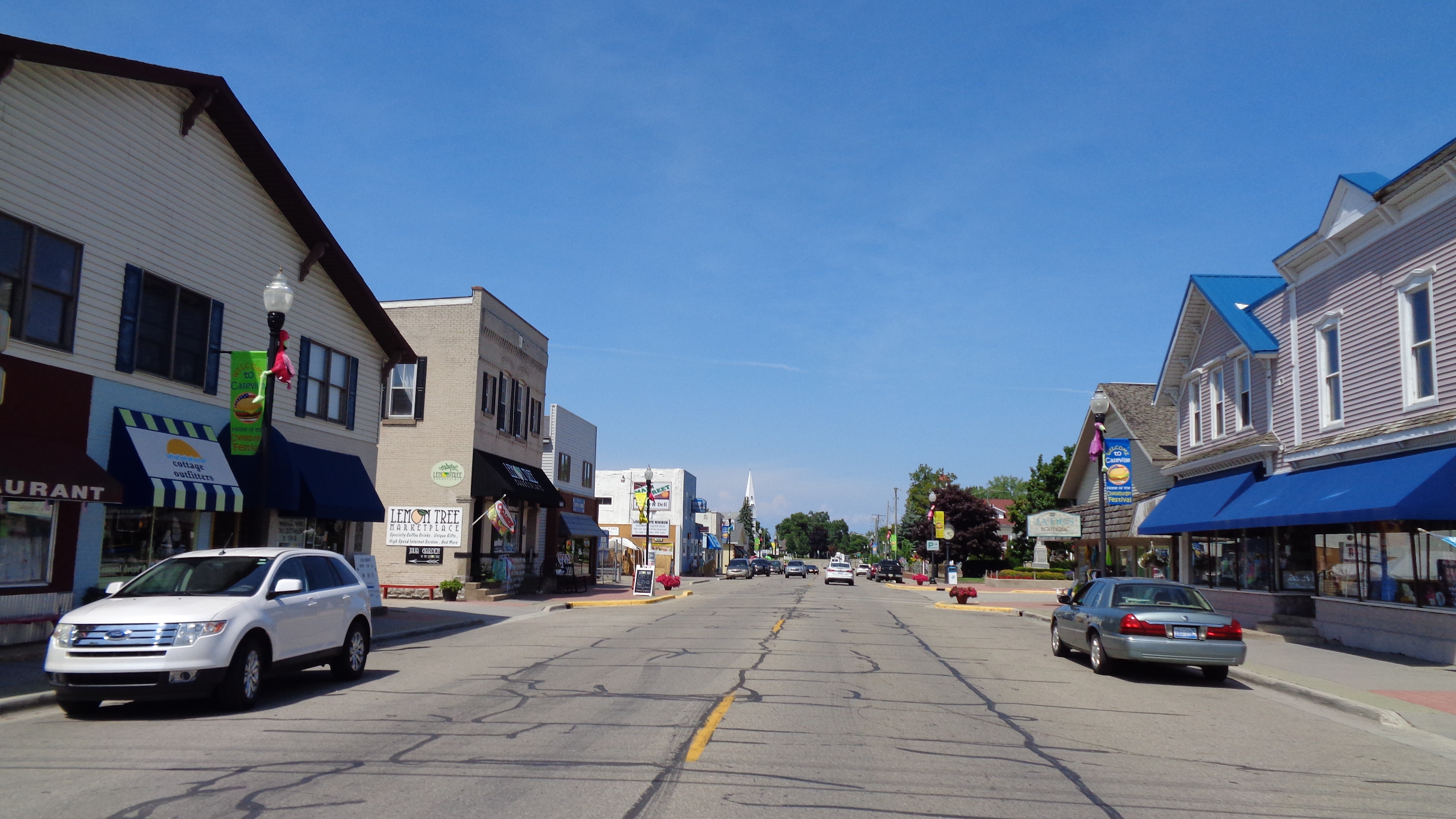
- Turnip Rock Lexington Downtown Port Huron Wind turbines near Reese Caseville

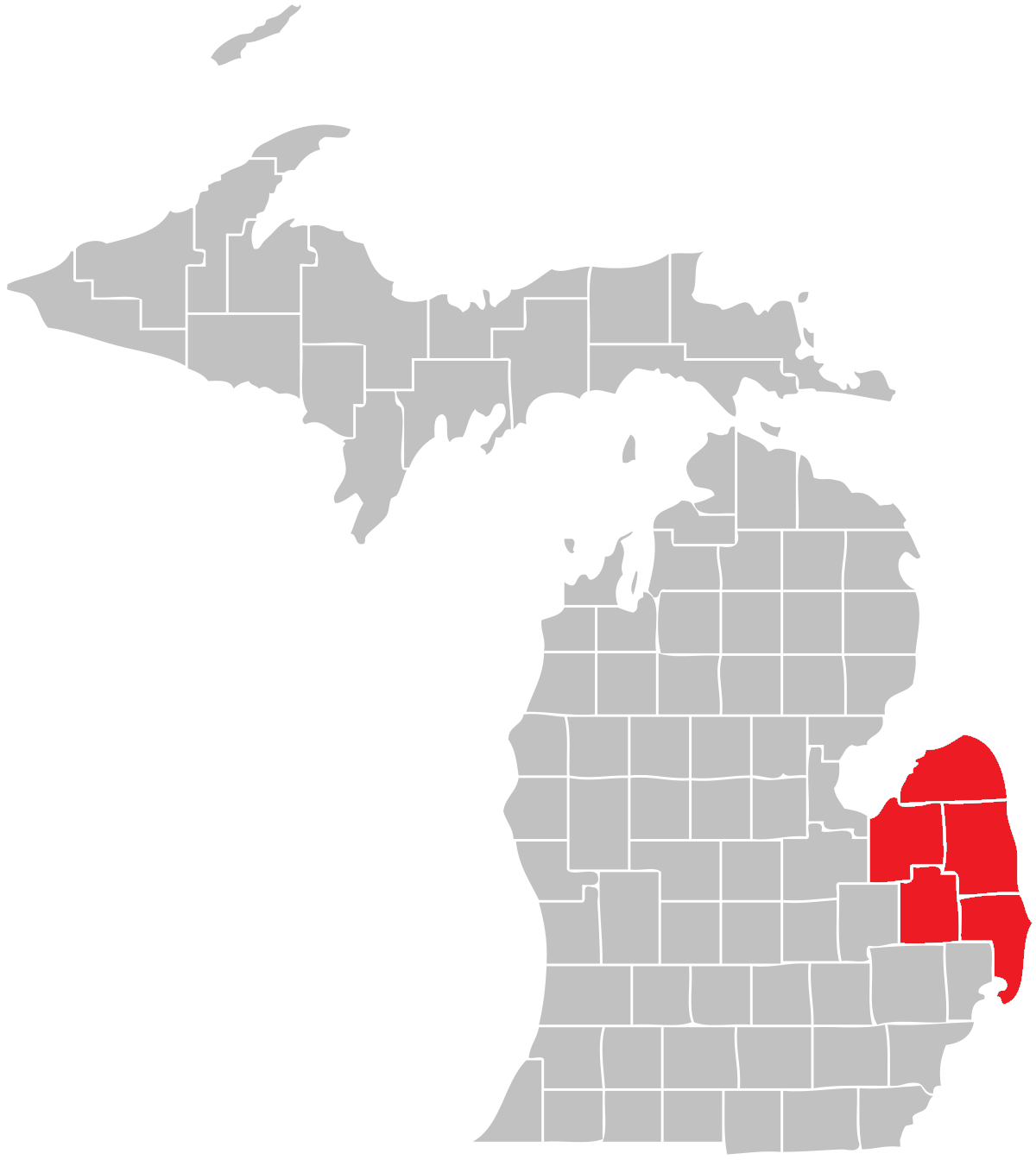
- Country: United States
- State: Michigan
- Largest city: Port Huron

Area
  - Total: 6,141 sq mi (15,910 km^{2})
  - Land: 3,966 sq mi (10,270 km^{2})
  - Water: 2,175 sq mi (5,630 km^{2})

Population (2020)
  - Total: 370,617
- Time zone: UTC−05:00 (Eastern)
  - Summer (DST): UTC−04:00 (EDT)
- Area codes: 989, 810

The Thumb is a region and a peninsula of the U.S. state of Michigan, so named because the Lower Peninsula is shaped like a mitten. The Thumb area is generally considered to be in the Central Michigan region, east of the Flint area and the Tri-Cities and north of Metro Detroit. The region is also branded as the Blue Water Area, and more recently Michigan's Thumb Coast, for tourism purposes.

The counties that constitute the Thumb form the peninsula that stretches northward into Lake Huron and Saginaw Bay. There is no formal list of which counties are part of the Thumb, but virtually all definitions include Huron, Tuscola, and Sanilac counties, and most include Lapeer and St. Clair counties. The population of the Thumb region as of the 2020 census was 370,617.

== Economy ==
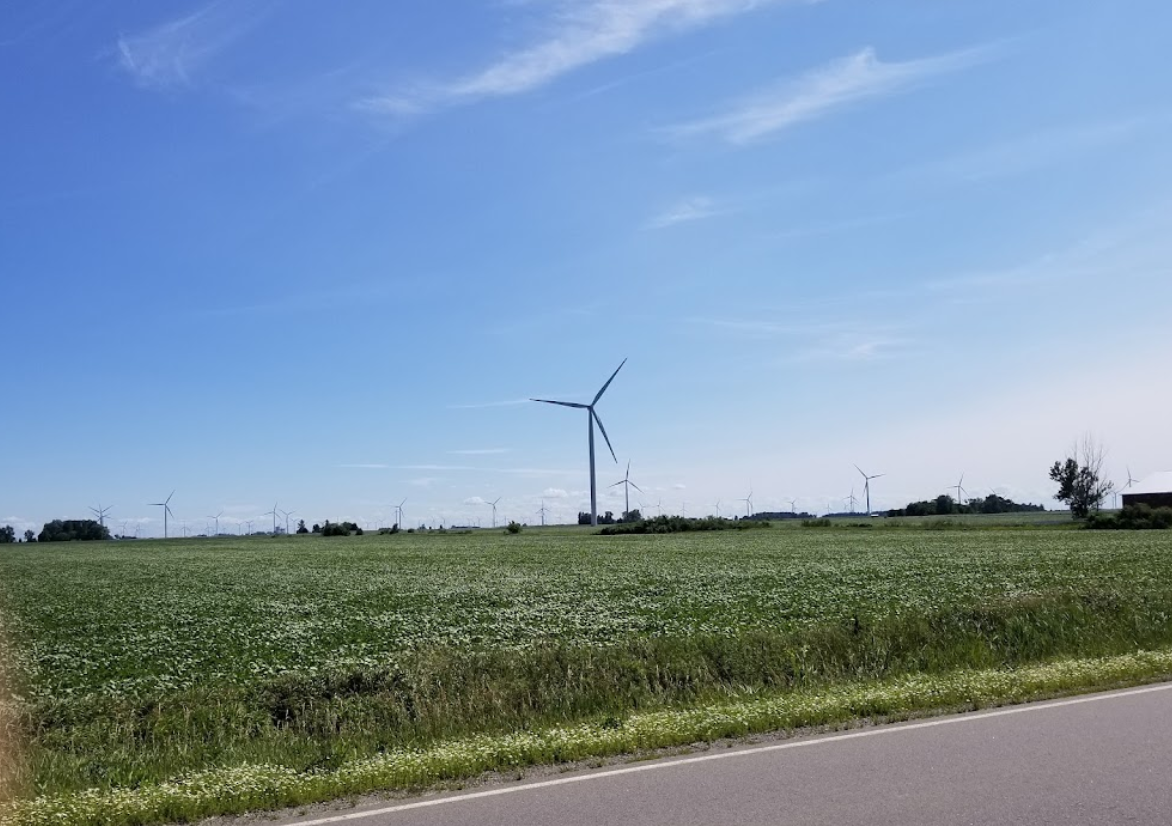
A wind farm in Chandler Township

The Thumb region is very flat with fertile soil, the reason for its historical role as a chiefly agricultural area. Major agricultural products include sugar beets, navy beans, corn, fruits, and fish from Saginaw Bay and Lake Huron. Manufacturing—particularly concerning the automotive industry—is also prevalent in Michigan's Thumb due to the region's proximity to the automotive centers of Detroit and Flint.

=== Industry ===
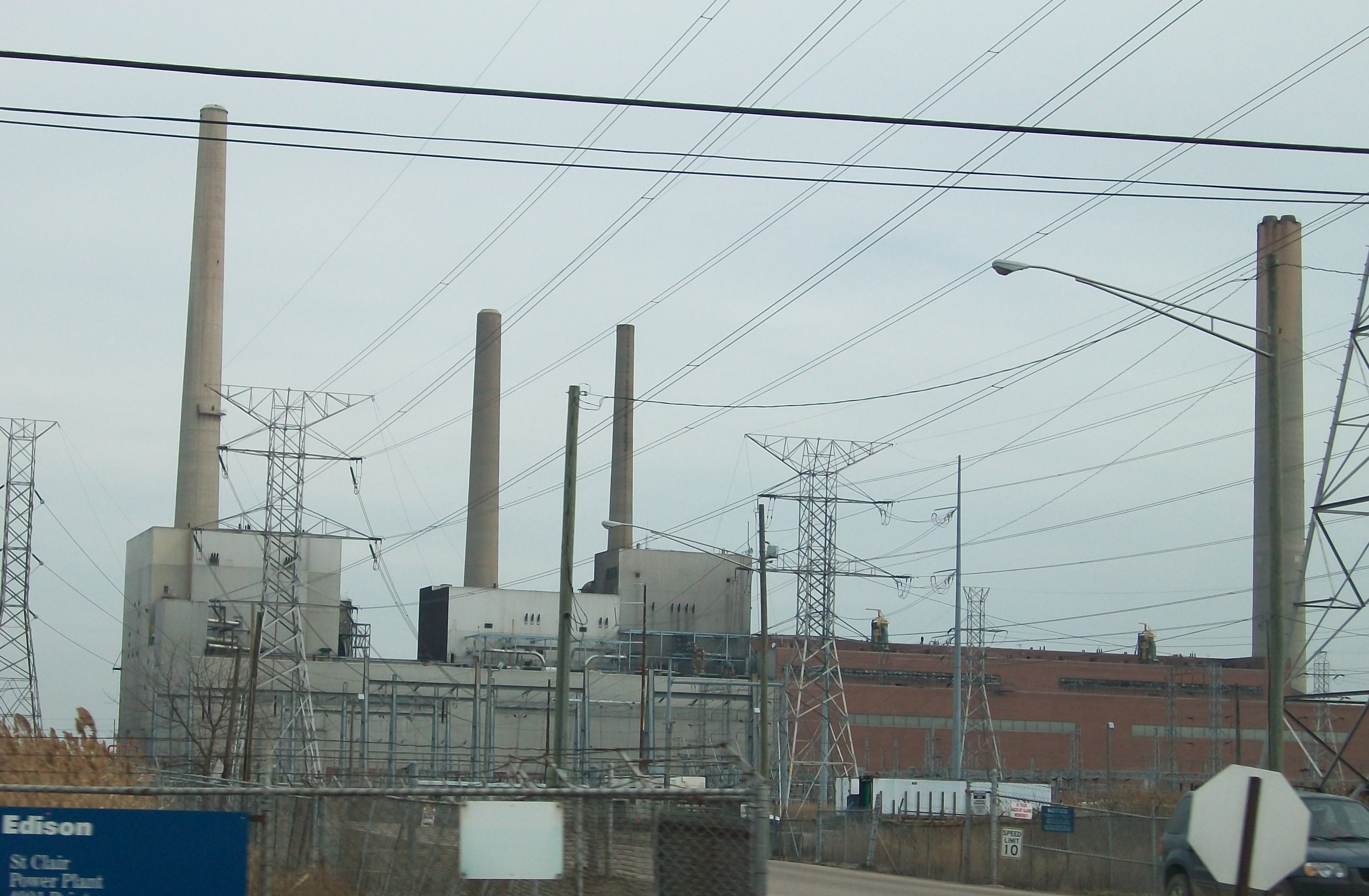
Detroit Edison's St. Clair Power Plant, once the largest in the world

The Thumb has many notable businesses, many linked to agriculture.

- Intertape Polymer Group, Inc. has a major factory in Marysville.
- Cargill Salt operates a large salt mine and factory in St. Clair. This is the only plant in the U.S. that produces Alberger salt, which is especially prized in the fast food industry because of its higher volume (due to its unique shape) and lower sodium content (for a given volume, not weight). This is part of Michigan's large salt-mining industry.
- Cooperative Elevator Company has been named the top Michigan Agriculture Exporter by the Michigan Department of Agriculture. Its headquarters are in Pigeon, and it has branch elevators in Deckerville, Akron, Gagetown, Sebewaing, Elkton, and Bad Axe.
- Detroit Edison is the operator of three power plants in the Thumb area: St. Clair and Belle River Power Plants in East China Township, and Greenwood Energy Center in Greenwood Township.
- Dow AgroSciences Harbor Beach manufactures agricultural chemicals: weed killer, fungicides, fertilizers and plant nutrients and herbicides.
- Mueller Industries owns and operates Mueller Brass in Port Huron.
- Grand Trunk Western Railway has a major rail yard in Port Huron Township.
- Marysville Hydrocarbons is an ethanol plant in Marysville.
- SMR Automotive manufactures rear view mirrors at facilities in Port Huron and Marysville.
- Port Huron-based P.J. Wallbank Spring manufactures components for transmissions.
- Port Huron's industrial park is home to many companies that produce plastic components for vehicles, such as Prism Plastics, Huron Plastics Group, and International Automotive Components.
- Michigan Ethanol, a partner of Broin Companies, operates a corn ethanol production facility in southwest Caro.
- Michigan Sugar Company, an agricultural cooperative owned by 1200 farmers, operates four plants in the area. It is the successor to the 100-year-old "Big Chief" and "Pioneer" Sugar companies. Local plants are located in Caro, Sebewaing, Croswell, and headquarters in Bay City.
- Keihin Michigan Manufacturing operates an auto part manufacturing plant in Capac, they build HVAC and intake manifold assemblies that are used in Honda vehicles. The plant is scheduled to close in 2021.
- Champion manufactures small and mid size buses at their facility in Lapeer County's Imlay Township.
- Sensient Technologies Corporation, Harbor Beach, makes food flavors and colors, yeast dehydrated products and vegetable protein extract.
- Star of the West Milling Co. which has grain elevators in Vassar and Cass City, joined with Eastern Michigan Grain in Emmett.
- Huron Castings produces shell molded steel castings in Pigeon.
- Pigeon Telephone Co. has been meeting telecommunications needs of the rural communities it serves since 1908.
- Agri-Valley Services, more commonly known as AVCI, is an internet service provider based out of Pigeon.
- Thumb Cellular has been providing rural cellular service to the Thumb area since 1991.

=== International Trade Corridor ===
The I-69 International Trade Corridor is a strategic commercial gateway between the Midwestern United States and Ontario, Canada, with multi-modal transportation infrastructure that offers a wide range of distribution options. The I-69 International Trade Corridor Next Michigan Development Corporation (NMDC) offers economic incentives to growing businesses, both existing and new, that utilize two or more forms of transportation to move their products and are located within the territory of the NMDC. The I-69 International Trade Corridor Next Michigan Development Corporation is the largest in the state of Michigan with 35 municipal partners.

Constituent counties of the trade corridor are: Shiawassee, Genesee, Lapeer, and St. Clair counties.

== Tourism ==
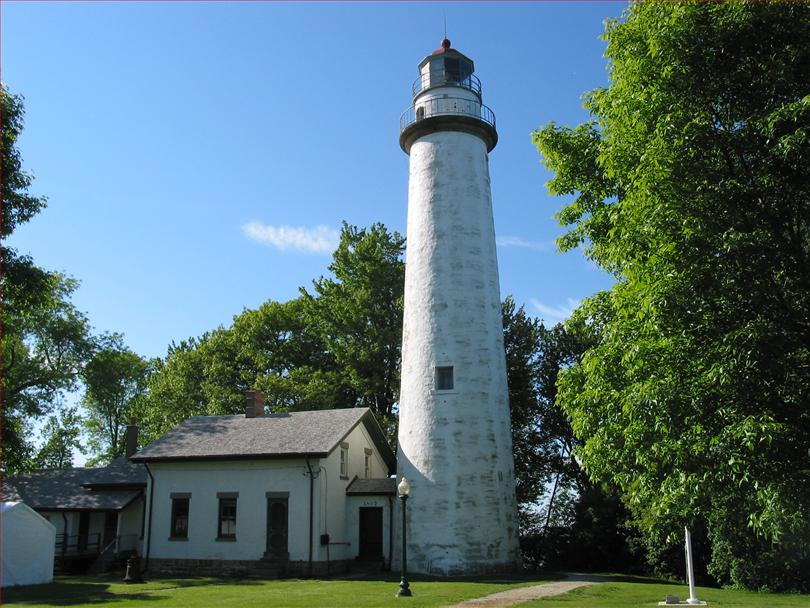
The Pointe aux Barques Light, near the tip of the Thumb

Some towns, such as Bay Port, Caseville, Harbor Beach, Lakeport, Lexington, Port Austin, Port Hope, Port Huron, Port Sanilac, Sebewaing, and St. Clair enjoy seasonal tourism, due to their locations on Lake Huron, Saginaw Bay, or the St. Clair River. Tourism and farming drive the local economy.

The Tip of The Thumb Heritage Water Trail is a nonprofit citizens organization working with the Huron County Parks to establish and maintain a water trail along Michigan's Lake Huron's shoreline.

=== Tourism Campaigns ===
Discover the Blue is a promotion by the Blue Water Area Convention and Visitor's Bureau. It is designed to attract visitors to the shoreline of eastern Michigan. Communities participating in Discover the Blue include shorline areas from Algonac in St. Clair County to Port Austin at the tip of the Thumb.

In 2025, the Blue Water Convention and Visitor's bureau rebranded their advertising campaign from Discover the Blue to Discover Michigan's Thumb Coast. The change puts The Thumb first and foremost in the region's branding strategy, due to an already established geographical awareness for the region as compared to Blue Water Area.

=== Unique to the Thumb ===
Many of the residents commute for work to Metro Detroit, Flint or the Tri-Cities. Incorporated cities with 2,000+ population in the Thumb area are Port Huron, Marysville, Lapeer, St. Clair, Marine City, Algonac, Caro, Imlay City, Bad Axe, Vassar, Sandusky and Croswell. The majority of these cities are in the southern portion of the Thumb.

Unique features in the area include the following:

- Algonac, known as the Venice of Michigan because of its many canals.
- Bad Axe was named after a broken axe found lodged in the knot of a tree at the clearing of the settlement's chief crossroads.
- Bay Port, is the world's largest freshwater fishing port.
- Harbor Beach is the home of the largest man-made harbor and the Harbor Beach Light.
- Harvest Wind Farm, an electrical generation project of Exelon Wind and Wolverine Power Supply Cooperative. Harvest II went into commercial operation in November 2012.
- Huron County Nature Center includes a 120-acre (0.49 km^{2}) wilderness arboretum that has been under the care of the Huron County Women's Clubs for more than 50 years.
- Kernan Memorial Nature Sanctuary is a 45-acre (180,000 m^{2}) refuge with 4,000 feet (1,200 m) of shoreline acquired October 30, 1989 on Lake Huron, in Huron County. On the western coast of Whiskey Harbor, this area is a great place to see migratory birds in early March and November.
- Kinde was once the bean capital of the world. Michigan Bean soup has been a staple for over a hundred years in the U.S. Senate dining room (Senate bean soup).
- Pigeon is the home of the Cooperative Elevator Company, one of the largest grain elevators in the state.
- Port Huron is the maritime capital of the Great Lakes, where Lake Huron flows into the St. Clair River. This is the largest city in the Thumb area. It was the boyhood home of Thomas Edison.
- The Sanilac Petroglyphs were discovered after massive fires swept the Lower Peninsula in 1881. Native Americans created this unusual artwork 300 to 1,000 years ago. The petroglyphs provide a glimpse into the lives of an ancient woodland people who occupied Michigan's Thumb area.
- Sebewaing is the sugar beet capital of the world, and home to one of the four Michigan Sugar Company factories in the Thumb region. The sugar companies were organized with money from lumber barons such as Rasmus Hanson.
- St. Clair boasts the world's largest boardwalk along freshwater, the St. Clair River.
- Turnip Rock, an unusual undercut sea stack at the extreme northern tip of the Thumb.
- Michigan Underwater Preserves are protected areas of the Great Lakes on Michigan's coast. There are nineteen major shipwrecks in the 276 square miles (710 km^{2}) of the Thumb Area Bottomland Preserve and the Sanilac Shores Underwater Preserve which expands a total of 163 square miles (420 km^{2}) of Lake Huron.
- Caseville is the home of the annual Cheeseburger in Caseville festival, a hometown festival devoted to Jimmy Buffett's song "Cheeseburger in Paradise".

=== Traveling around the Thumb ===
A favorite of tourists who visit this area is traveling the Lake Huron and Saginaw Bay shoreline via M-25 (formerly US Highway 25 until 1973). M-25 starts at the end of I-69/I-94 in Port Huron at the foot of the Blue Water Bridge and ends in Bay City. The whole highway is about 150 miles (240 km), and passes through quaint cities and villages. Located along Lake Huron through which M-25 passes are five lighthouses: Fort Gratiot Lighthouse, Port Sanilac lighthouse, Pointe aux Barques Lighthouse, Harbor Beach Light, and the Port Austin Lighthouse.

The Lake Huron Circle Tour is a designated scenic road system connecting all of the Great Lakes and the St. Lawrence River. Many visitors choose to begin the circle tour in Port Huron, from which they can circle Lake Huron. M-25 winds around the Thumb and along Saginaw Bay to Saginaw and Bay City. Lexington and Port Austin feature beaches and boardwalks that are favorites with visitors.

=== Lighthouse Tour ===
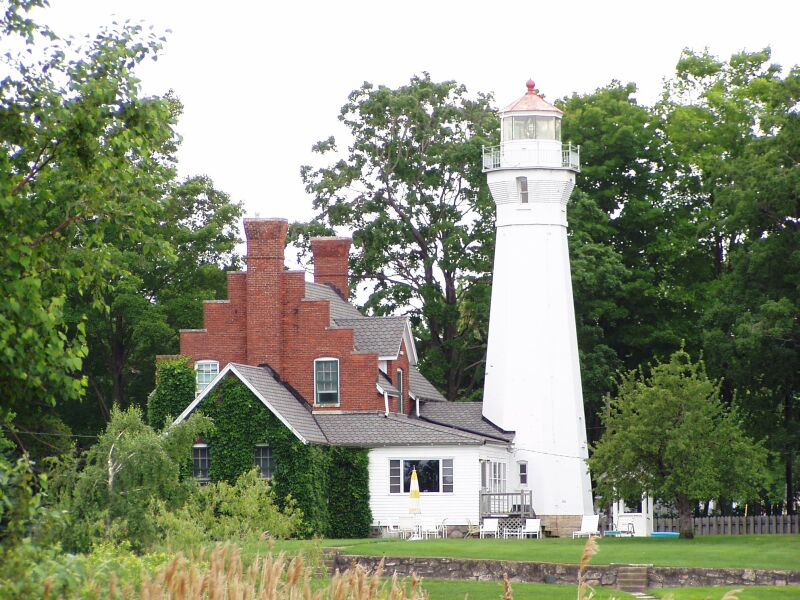
Lighthouse at Port Sanilac on Lake Huron

In order from east to west:

- Huron Lightship — Lake Huron / St. Clair River — Port Huron
- Fort Gratiot Light—Lake Huron / St. Clair River—Port Huron
- Port Sanilac Light—Lake Huron— Port Sanilac—Private
- White Rock Memorial Light—Lake Huron — White Rock—Private
- Harbor Beach Light—Lake Huron — Harbor Beach
- Pointe aux Barques Light—Lake Huron—near Port Hope
- Port Austin Light—Lake Huron — Port Austin
- Charity Island Light — Saginaw Bay
- Saginaw River Light — Saginaw River

=== Area festivals and events ===
- Antique and Yard Sale Trail 2nd weekend in August, (Algonac to Sebewaing)
- Art on the River, third week in June, St. Clair.
- Art on the Avenue, downtown Port Huron, 3rd week in August.
- "Arts and Crafts shows calendar". Archived from the original on 2008-01-20. around the state.
- Bay Port Fish Sandwich Festival (Bay Port)
- Blue Water Ramble (St. Clair) Annual International Bicycling Event along the St. Clair River in Michigan and Ontario, Canada, involving two ferry boat crossings, first weekend in October.
- Boat Night & Port Huron to Mackinac Boat Race (Port Huron to Mackinac Island)
- Cheeseburger in Caseville Festival (Caseville)
- Croswell Agricultural Society Fair (Croswell) celebrating its 125th year in 2009
- Croswell Swinging Bridge Festival (Croswell)
- Feast of the Sainte Claire sponsored by the Port Huron Museum of Arts and History, a large living reenactment of 18th century life—Memorial Day weekend, (Port Huron).
- Harbor Beach Maritime Festival(Harbor Beach)
- Huron County Fair (Bad Axe)
- Michigan Bean Festival Labor Day weekend (Fairgrove)
- Farmer's Festival (Pigeon)
- Michigan Sugar Festival (Sebewaing)
- "Port Huron Float Down" Third Sunday in August (Port Huron)
- "The Original" Country Christmas Lighted Farm Implement Parade (Sandusky)
- Tuscola County Pumpkin Festival (Caro)
- Sanilac County 4-H Fair (Sandusky)
- St. Clair County 4-H Fair (Goodells County Park)
- Thumbfest (Lexington)
- Yale Bologna Festival (Yale)

== Thumb counties ==
Counties of the Thumb of Michigan

=== Huron ===
Huron County is located at the tip of the Thumb. The county is surrounded on three sides by water – Saginaw Bay and Lake Huron, and has over 90 miles (140 km) of shoreline, from White Rock on Lake Huron to Sebewaing on Saginaw Bay, and more shoreline parks than any other county in the state.

The county's economy relies on agriculture and ranks as one of the top agricultural counties in Michigan. Rich farmland inland produces beans, sugar beets and grain, including most of the world's supply of navy beans. Tourism is also important to Huron County with bay front and lakefront towns such as Sebewaing, Caseville, Port Austin, Port Hope, and Harbor Beach, attracting tourists from all over. Huron County borders Saginaw Bay and Lake Huron. There are two state parks – Sleeper State Park and Port Crescent State Park. Three roadside parks – Jenks Park, Brown Park, and White Rock Park. Also, Huron County maintains nine county parks along the shoreline, which are Caseville Park, Lighthouse Park, Stafford Park, McGraw Park, Philp Park, Port Austin Bird Creek Park, Wagener Park, Oak Beach Park, and Sebewaing Park.
The county seat is Bad Axe, located in the center of the county.

=== Lapeer ===
The origin of the name of the county is often disputed, but it may have derived from the French words la pierre, meaning "the stone". This name could be a reference to the rounded stones, or flint pebbles, found in the rivers and streams throughout the area. Another theory is that it may be an English variation of Le Pays Plat, meaning "the flat land", which is one of the original names given to the area by the French, and can be found on many early fur trader maps of the area. The idea is that "Le Pays" may have evolved into the current pronunciation, "Lapeer".

Lapeer County is in many ways different from the other counties of the Thumb. First, it is heavily influenced by its proximity to Flint and Detroit, so as a result, its economy depends more heavily on manufacturing than the other counties of the region. Second, although agriculture is still a key economic factor in Lapeer County, it is not as important to the economy as in the other counties. Although there are still a few large-scale farms located in the county, the numbers are not found to the same extent, and these days, most farming in Lapeer now takes place on smaller, independent farms, which usually supply the local markets only. Lastly, in addition to its economic and agricultural differences, Lapeer County's geography is very different from the other counties of the Thumb. Its topography is generally gently rolling to quite hilly, and unlike its neighbors, which are flatter, and border on Lake Huron or Lake St. Clair, Lapeer County is landlocked. The county still has hundreds of acres of inland lakes such as Barnes Lake, Miller Lake, Lake Neppessing, the Holloway Reservoir, Big Fish Lake, and Lake Metamora, and several state recreation areas, including the Ortonville Recreation Area and the Metamora-Hadley Recreation Area, which still bring in many campers and tourists.

=== Sanilac ===
Sanilac County has the largest area of land in both the Thumb and the entire Lower Peninsula. Like other counties, Sanilac has fertile and flat land, great for growing crops. Towns like Lexington and Port Sanilac bring in many tourists from the Detroit Area. Sandusky is the county seat and largest city.

=== St. Clair ===
St. Clair County has the largest population in the Thumb, and is considered part of the Metro Detroit MSA. Many residents farther north in the Thumb, especially Sanilac County, travel to Port Huron for shopping and work. It is the farthest county to the east in Michigan, and most of the eastern border is the St. Clair River, which separates Michigan from Ontario. For the most part, St. Clair County is flat with an agricultural economy dominating in the north and west; in the 19th century, agriculture and lumbering were important east to the St. Clair River. Sugar beets were cultivated and annual festivals were held at harvest time. In addition, many farms had mixed agriculture. There are steep hills and small canyons near the Black River. Since the mid-20th century, manufacturing had dominated in and around Port Huron.

=== Tuscola ===
Like Huron County, Tuscola is mostly dependent on agriculture. Industries such as sugar refining and ethanol processing, as well as growing various grains and beans, make up most of the economy. Caro, one of the largest cities in the Thumb (the largest if you exclude St. Clair and Lapeer counties), is named after Cairo, Egypt and is the county seat. Tuscola County only has 18 miles (29 km) of shoreline along Saginaw Bay, so it is not as dependent on tourism as the other counties in the area. Tuscola County is economically tied to the surrounding region as well as to the Saginaw, Bay City, and Flint areas.

== Borderline regions ==
The boundaries of what is included in the Thumb are often debated, but nearly all definitions include Huron, Sanilac, and Tuscola counties, known as the tri-county region. Disputed areas include:

- St. Clair County, especially the southern portion, as the county is now classified as part of Metro Detroit by the Census Bureau.
- Lapeer County
- Richmond and northern Macomb County
- Genesee County

== Blue Water Area ==
The Blue Water Area is another term describing the Thumb of Michigan. The term usually applies to St. Clair County and surrounding areas due to the Blue Water Bridge which connects Port Huron to Sarnia, Ontario. Blue Water Country is sometime used to describe a similar region on the Canadian side of Lake Huron,and is even the name of the Huron County town of Bluewater, Ontario.

In 2025, the Blue Water Convention and Visitor's bureau rebranded their advertising campaign from Discover the Blue to Discover Michigan's Thumb Coast. The change puts The Thumb first and foremost in the region's branding strategy, due to an already established geographical awareness for the region as compared to Blue Water Area, which could be used to describe many areas of Michigan and Ontario.

== Geography ==
=== Land features ===
See also List of Michigan state parks and geography of Michigan.

- The Thumb's landscape ranges from a flat sandy plain along the shores of Lake Huron and Saginaw Bay, to a gently rolling topography. This land is fertile and well suited for agriculture. The most unusual geographic formation is a rugged glacial moraine, known collectively as the Hadley Hills, which extends in a northeasterly direction through the center of the Thumb, from the southwestern portion of the peninsula.
- All counties except for Lapeer border Saginaw Bay or Lake Huron.
- The places with the highest elevation are all associated with the Hadley Hills, and are located in Lapeer County. They are: Pinnacle Point, at 1,262 feet (385 m) and Kerr (Cemetery) Hill, at 1,258 feet (383 m), both in Hadley Township; Mount Christie, at 1,251 feet (381 m), in Metamora Township; and a point near Mayville, reaching up to 1,050 feet (320 m) above sea level.
- The lowest point in the Thumb region is the shore of Lake St. Clair, at a low of 574 feet (175 m) above sea level.
- Huron County is very flat. It has large fields that were used for agriculture and now are the sites of numerous wind turbines to generate electricity.
- The "tip of the Thumb" is Pointe Aux Barques, between Port Austin and Grindstone City.
- Marlette is called the "heart of the Thumb," because of its central position on the peninsula.

=== Major rivers ===
The Thumb has many waterways.

- The Cass River has many branches, one of which flows into the Shiawassee River in the Shiawassee National Wildlife Refuge at 43°22′42″N 83°59′04″W less than 1 mile (2 km) from where the Shiawassee merges with the Tittabawassee River to form the Saginaw River.
- The Pinnebog, Shebahyonk, and Pigeon rivers all rise in the center of Huron County and empty into Saginaw Bay.
- The St. Clair River, connects Lake Huron to Lake St. Clair, and is the farthest east border in Michigan. It forms a low impression in eastern St. Clair County, and has a delta at its mouth (North America's largest freshwater delta), which includes Harsens Island and Walpole Island, Ontario. Ferries cross the river at Algonac and Marine City, these being international border crossings.
- The Black River rises near Minden City and flows into the St. Clair River at Port Huron. The Black River forms a basin in Sanilac County, and northern St. Clair County.
- The north branch of the Flint River lies in northern Lapeer County. It rises near North Branch. The southern branch flows through the central and southern portion of Lapeer County, originates in Brandon, Atlas, Hadley, and Metamora townships before merging with the North Branch just north of the Holloway Reservoir.

== History and local culture ==
Map of the Surveyed Part of the Territory of Michigan by Orange Risdon, 1825, showing an early, larger incarnation of Sanilac County, most of which had not yet been surveyed

=== Culture ===
Since the late 18th century, ethnic European Americans have displaced the Native American tribes that historically occupied this territory. Since the early 20th century, they have dominated the population and culture of the Thumb. The French were the first Europeans to arrive, and thus influenced much of the early culture. They were mostly engaged in the fur trading and lumber industries, and had relatively few settlers. After the British won the French and Indian War, they took over this former French territory.

In the early years, Europeans encountered and traded with people of the Meskwaki and Sauk tribes, already living in the area for centuries. There may have also been other tribes in the area such as the Potawatomi, Ojibwe, and Kickapoo, but they would have been transient tribes, or found in very small numbers. All native Thumb area tribes are members of the Algonquian peoples, a large language family. Other tribes who migrated later into the area included the Wyandot (Huron), an Iroquoian language-speaking people; and the Ottawa. The displacement of native peoples took place in many areas during the settling of North America.

Many of these new settlers were sent into the area by the British from Canada in an effort to establish their dominance over the Great Lakes. In 1783, control of the Thumb was officially transferred to the newly formed United States, after the American Revolution and by the Treaty of Paris. The British were a dominant influence until after the War of 1812, when the northern border was firmly defined and this area came under US control. The US organized the Northwest Territory, and American settlement of Michigan and the Thumb was well underway by the mid-19th century. Construction of the Erie Canal through Central New York created stronger connections with the port of New York and eastern markets. Settlers migrated west from New York and New England into Ohio and Michigan, seeking new territory.

As a result of this history, the land was settled primarily by people of ethnic English and Scots-Irish descent; many arrived from Canada. Other settlers of the same ancestry migrated from eastern states such as New York, and Pennsylvania, as well as from New England. Immigration from the British Isles took place through the century, and later 19th and 20th century residents included Polish and German immigrants who migrated from Europe through the Detroit area. Many of the customs, much of the regional lifestyle, and even the local accent, strongly reflect these origins. Some local radio stations have featured polka shows, and various ethnic festivals, such as the Polkafest, in Kinde, are representative of Eastern European cultures.

=== Historical events ===
- The Port Huron area is one of oldest European settlements in the state of Michigan, first settled by French colonists.
- Colonial-era forts such as Fort Gratiot (north of Port Huron) and Fort Sinclair (near present-day St. Clair) were built along the St. Clair River.
- Bad Axe was named so because Captain Rudolph Papst found an old axe in 1861, when he was clearing land for the present-day Huron County seat.
- The great Thumb Fire took place on September 5, 1881, in the Thumb area of Michigan. The fire, which burned over a million acres (4,000 km^{2}) in less than a day, was the consequence of drought, hurricane-force winds, heat, the after-effects of the Port Huron Fire of 1871, and the ecological damage wrought by the era's logging techniques of clear cutting forests.
- The Great Lakes Storm of 1913 was a November blizzard with hurricane-force winds; it devastated the Great Lakes Basin in the United States Midwest and the Canadian province of Ontario. The storm also battered and overturned large ships on four of the five Great Lakes, particularly Lake Huron.

== Notable people (by town) ==
More comprehensive lists are available at individual cities, villages, etc. See local towns of interest at the bottom of the page for links.

=== Brown City ===
- Robert Teet – Wrestler, author

=== Cass City ===
- Brewster H. Shaw – retired United States Air Force colonel and former NASA astronaut.

=== Deckerville ===
- Gabriel Rheaume – Writer – The Shores We Walk

=== Harbor Beach ===
- Frank Murphy – Detroit mayor, Michigan governor, U.S. Attorney General and Justice of the United States Supreme Court.

=== Lapeer ===
- Marguerite de Angeli, children's book author, Newbery Award winner
- Danelle Gay, Miss Michigan USA 2006
- Terry Knight, singer, DJ, manager, Terry Knight and the Pack, Grand Funk Railroad
- Jake Long, offensive lineman, Miami Dolphins
- Terry Nichols, accomplice in the Oklahoma City bombing
- Jim Slater, hockey player Atlanta Thrashers

=== Port Huron ===
- Thomas Edison – Inventor and entrepreneur settled in Port Huron from 1854 to 1863.
- Obadiah Gardner – born in Port Huron, he moved to Maine as a child, where he lived and worked for the rest of his life, being elected as US Senator from Maine
- Terry McMillan – Award-winning author of novels Waiting to Exhale, and How Stella Got Her Groove Back

== Local elected officials ==
Local politicians in Washington and Lansing are listed below.

=== United States Congress ===
District 9 – Northern Macomb, and all of St Clair, Lapeer, Sanilac, Huron, and Tuscola counties.

- Lisa McClain, Republican

District 8 – Arbela Township in Tuscola county, Eastern Midland county, most of Genesee County, and all of Bay and Saginaw counties.

- Kristen McDonald Rivet, Democrat

=== Michigan House ===
32nd District – Northern Macomb and six townships in St Clair County.

- Pamela Hornberger, Republican

81st District – Most of St Clair County, except Port Huron.

- Gary Eisen, Republican

82nd District – All of Lapeer County.

- Gary Howell, Republican

83rd District – City of Port Huron, the Townships of Fort Gratiot and Burtchville, and all of Sanilac County.

- Andrew Beeler, Republican

84th District – All of Huron and Tuscola counties.

- Phil Green, Republican

=== Michigan Senate ===
25th District – All of Huron, St Clair and Sanilac counties, and the Cities of Memphis, New Baltimore, and Richmond and the Townships of Armada and Richmond in Macomb County.

- Dan Lauwers, Republican

31st District – All of Bay, Lapeer and Tuscola counties.

- Kevin Daley, Republican

== Colleges and universities ==
- St. Clair County Community College, with the main campus in Port Huron, and learning centers in Huron, Sanilac, and Lapeer counties.
- Baker College, with a campus in Cass City, Sandusky, and Port Huron.
- University of Michigan–Flint, Saginaw Valley State University, and Delta College, while not in the Thumb, are universities and colleges that attract many residents from the Thumb.

== Museums ==
=== Harbor Beach ===
- Frank Murphy Memorial Museum and home.
- Grice House Museum – Harbor Beach

=== Marysville ===
- Marysville Historical Museum – Marysville
- Wills Ste. Claire Auto Museum – Marysville

=== Port Huron ===
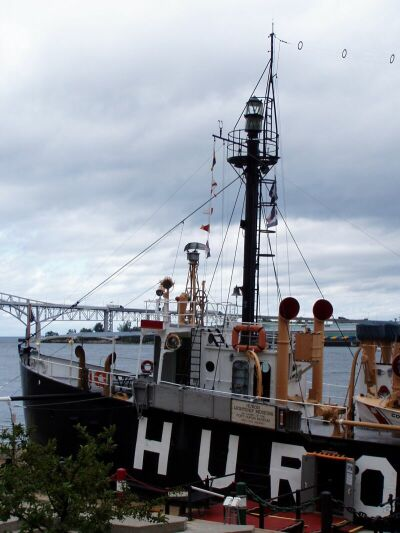
Huron Light Ship Museum in the St. Clair River, Port Huron, Michigan

- Port Huron Museum – a series of five museums – Port Huron
- Carnegie Center – Port Huron
- Huron Lightship – Port Huron
- Thomas Edison Depot Museum – Port Huron
- USCGC Bramble (WLB-392) – Port Huron
- Fort Gratiot Lighthouse – Port Huron

=== Elsewhere in the Thumb ===
- Sanilac County Historical Museum – Port Sanilac
- Bad Axe Historical Society Museum – Bad Axe
- Capac Historical Museum – Capac
- Pointe aux Barques Lighthouse near Port Hope
- St. Clair County Farm Museum – Goodells
- Port Austin History Center - Port Austin

== Media ==
=== Radio ===
The Thumb Area Radio Region is an unranked market that is influenced by Detroit Radio Market, the Tri-Cities Radio Market and the Flint Market, with stations in Port Huron and Sarnia, Ontario, also serving the region.

Local radio stations in the Thumb area

=== Newspapers ===
- The Huron Daily Tribune is a daily newspaper serving the "Upper Thumb Area of Michigan", which includes all of Huron and portions of Tuscola counties.
- The Times Herald is a daily newspaper headquartered in Port Huron and distributed in St. Clair and Sanilac counties. It is owned by the Gannett Company.
- Daily editions of the Detroit Free Press and The Detroit News are available throughout the area.
- The Bay City Times and Saginaw News are available in northern and western portions of the area, while the Flint Journal is available in Lapeer County.

Huron County newspapers

- Harbor Beach Times
- Huron County Press
- Huron Daily Tribune
- The News Weekly
- The Lakeshore Guardian
- Thumb Blanket

Lapeer County newspapers

- Buyer's Guide
- The County Press
- LA View
- Webco Press

Sanilac County newspapers

- Brown City Banner
- Buyers Guide
- Camden Publications
- Deckerville Recorder
- Marlette Leader
- Sandusky Tribune
- Sanilac County News

St. Clair County newspapers

- Blue Water Shopper
- Port Huron Times Herald
- The Thumb Print News
- The Voice
- The Yale Expositor

Tuscola County Newspapers

- Tuscola County Advertiser
- Cass City Chronicle
- Cass River Trader
- Reese Reporter
- Vassar Pioneer Times
- Mayville Monitor

=== Broadcast television ===
The Lapeer County, St. Clair County and Sanilac County area lies in the Detroit Television Market. The far northern and western areas lie inside the Flint/Tri-Cities Television Market. The only broadcast TV station licensed to the Thumb region is WDCQ-TV, the PBS station licensed to Bad Axe.

Flint/Tri-Cities

- WSMH, Fox 66
- WEYI-TV, NBC / CW 25
- WJRT-TV, ABC 12
- WNEM-TV, CBS / MyTV 5
- WDCQ-TV, PBS 19

Sarnia/Windsor Ontario

- CBET-DT, CBC 9
- CIII-DT, Global 22/29
- CICO-DT, TVO 32/59
- CKCO-TV, CTV 42

Detroit area

- WJBK, Fox 2
- WDIV-TV, NBC 4
- WXYZ-TV, ABC 7
- WWJ-TV, CBS 62
- WTVS, PBS 56
- WKBD, CW50
- WMYD, MyTV 20
- WADL, independent 38

Alpena area

- WBKB-TV, CBS / ABC / Fox / MyTV 11

== Transportation ==
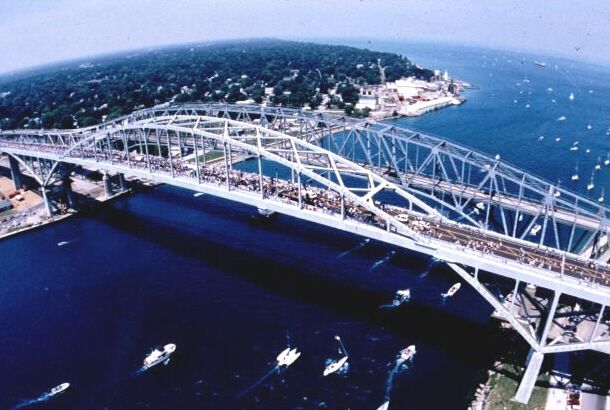
Port Huron's two Blue Water Bridges, taken during the Port Huron to Mackinac Yacht Race

=== Borders ===
The border between Port Huron, Michigan and Sarnia, Ontario, is one of the busiest connections between Canada and the US. Crossings include the two Blue Water Bridges and the two St. Clair River Railway Tunnels. Ferries also connect to Canada at Marine City and Algonac.

=== Major highways ===
(organized by numbers)

- I-69 begins at the Blue Water Bridge, proceeds west through Flint, then Lansing, and then turns south to Angola, Indiana.
- I-94 has its eastern terminus at the U.S. side of the Blue Water Bridge in Port Huron, at the Sarnia, Ontario, Canada border, where together with I-69 it meets Ontario Highway 402.
- M-15
- M-19
- M-24
- M-25 is a highway of an arc-like shape closely following the outline of the Thumb along the Lake Huron/Saginaw Bay shoreline between Port Huron and Bay City. It is generally a scenic drive.
- M-29
- M-46 is a cross peninsular road, running across the mitten and the Thumb—from Port Sanilac on the Lake Huron shore; through Saginaw near Saginaw Bay; and then on to Muskegon on the Lake Michigan shore. This east-west surface route nearly bisects the Lower Peninsula of Michigan latitudinally.
- M-53 (Van Dyke Road) is a gateway route to the Thumb of Michigan, carrying vacationers to the resorts and cottages on Saginaw Bay and Lake Huron in the vicinity of Caseville and Port Austin. It goes up the middle of the Thumb, and directly connects in Macomb County to the M-53 expressway. It is an important route for agricultural and manufactured goods.
- M-81
- M-90
- M-136
- M-138
- M-142
- M-154 located on Harsens Island

=== Rail ===
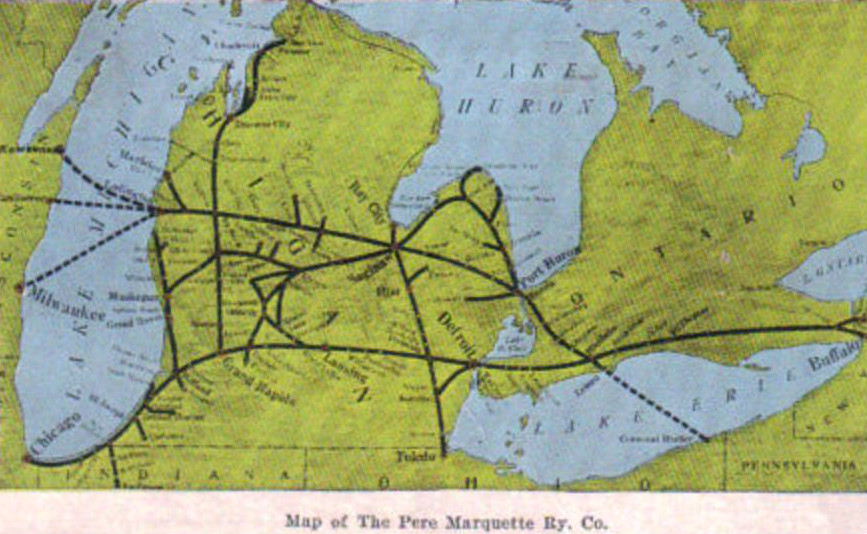
Pere Marquette Railway system in 1925.

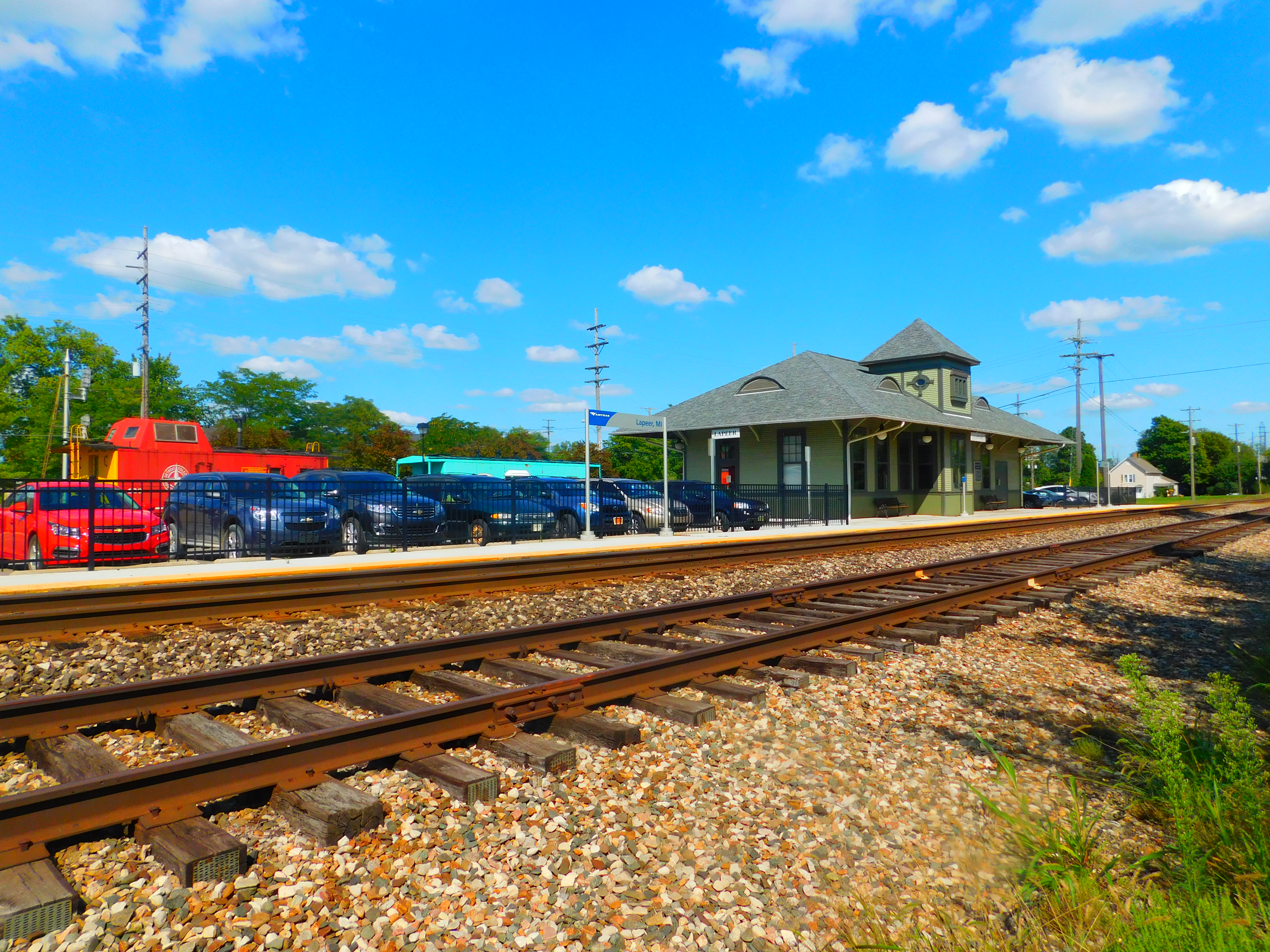
Once used by Grand Trunk, the Lapeer Station still sees Passenger service from Amtrak.

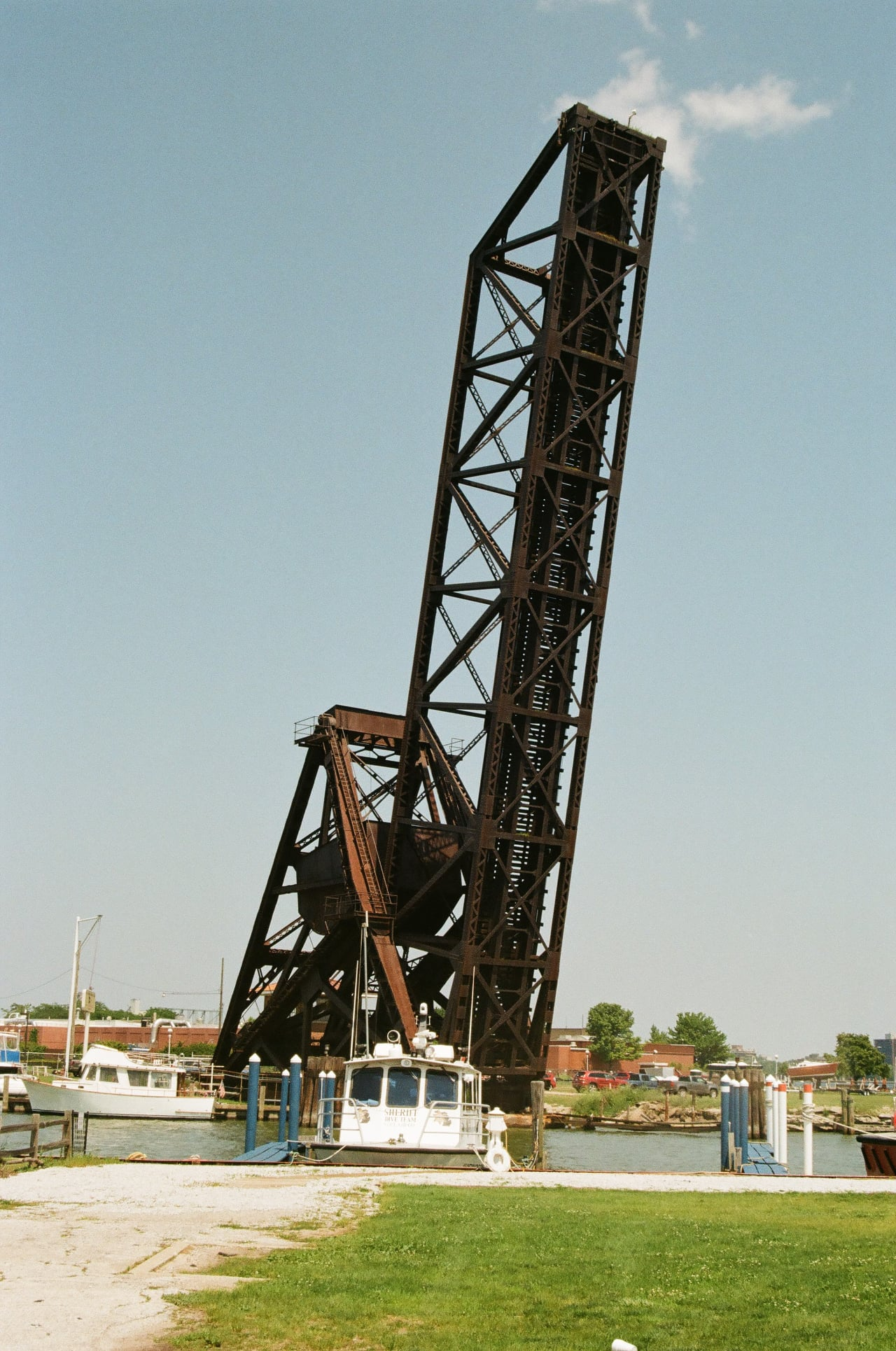
The Pere Marquette Railway bridge in Port Huron, Michigan, as seen in 2021. It was demolished in 2023.

The earliest rail lines in the region date back to the mid 1800s and were precursors to the larger Grand Trunk Western Railroad. These included the Chicago, Detroit and Canada Grand Trunk Junction Railroad; the Chicago and Lake Huron Railroad; and later the Pontiac, Oxford, and Northern Railroad, also known as the "Polly-Ann".

Meantime, the Pere Marquette Railway was also expanding in the region, and by the late 1800s, had acquired the East Saginaw and St. Clair Railroad, the Port Huron and Northwestern Railway, and the Saginaw, Tuscola, and Huron Railroad.

Both the Pere Marquette and the Grand Trunk, through these acquisitions, established east-west mainlines across the Lower Peninsula of Michigan, with termini in Port Huron and branch lines going north into Thumb. The Pere Marqette served communities such as Croswell, Bad Axe, Sandusky, and Sebewaing, while the Grand Trunk provided service to Imlay City, Cass City, Caseville, and Harbor Beach.

Other railroads with a more limited presence in the Thumb included the Handy Brother's Detroit, Bay City, and Western and Port Huron and Detroit Railroad; the Michigan Central Railroad (later Penn Central and Conrail); the Tuscola and Saginaw Bay Railway; and interurban railroads such as the Detroit United Railway.

The Pere Marquete would become part of Chesapeake and Ohio Railway in 1947, while the Grand Trunk was a wholly owned subsidiary of the Canadian National Railway. The two class I railroads connected Thumb area farmers and passengers to the greater North American railroad network.

The economic challenges of the 1970s, followed by deregulation and consolidation in the 1980s, lead to the abandonment of many miles of track in the Thumb area. Passenger service nationwide had been folded into Amtrak in 1971, and the remaining thumb railroads focused mostly on moving agricultural products to market.

The Chesapeake and Ohio became part of the Chessie System in 1973. The Grand Trunk abandoned its entire line from Imlay City to Caseville in 1974. The Chessie System and later CSX continued to operate many branch lines in the Thumb through the 1980s and 1990s, selling what was left of the original Pere Marquette system to Huron and Eastern Railway.

Today, Amtrak's Blue Water service provides daily round-trip passenger service between Port Huron and Chicago, with an intermediate stop in Lapeer. Shortline railroad operator Genesee & Wyoming owns the majority of the remaining track in the Thumb through their acquisition of Huron and Eastern. Canadian National continues to have a presence as well, due to the St. Clair Tunnel in Port Huron and their Flint Subdivision, in which CSX has trackage rights between Port Huron and Flint.

=== Transit ===
Blue Water Area Transit serves the city of Port Huron and surrounding areas.

=== Airports ===
The only international airport in the Thumb is St. Clair County International Airport about 6 miles (9.7 km) outside Port Huron. City airports include: Caro Municipal, Dupont-Lapeer Airport, Huron County Memorial Airport, Marine City Airport, Marlette Municipal, Sandusky City, and Yale Airport. Scheduled airline service is available from MBS International Airport in Freeland and Flint Bishop International Airport. While neither of these airports is in the Thumb, both are relatively close by.

== Area codes ==
Area code 989 covers about half of the Thumb: Huron, Tuscola, and far northern Sanilac County (and the Marlette area). The Thumb's other half is covered by area code 810, which takes in most of Sanilac, Lapeer, Genesee and Saint Clair counties. All of Macomb County is served by area code 586, as is a small part of south-western Saint Clair County.

== See also ==
=== State ===
- Michigan

=== Regional ===
- Flint/Tri-Cities and Tri-Cities
- Lake Huron
- Metro Detroit

=== Counties ===
- List of counties in Michigan

=== Cities and villages ===
- Akron (Tuscola)
- Algonac (St. Clair)
- Applegate (Sanilac)
- Almont (Lapeer)
- Armada (Macomb)
- Bad Axe (Huron)
- Brown City (Sanilac/Lapeer)
- Capac (St. Clair)
- Caro (Tuscola)
- Carsonville (Sanilac)
- Caseville (Huron)
- Cass City (Tuscola)
- Clifford (Lapeer)
- Columbiaville (Lapeer)
- Croswell (Sanilac)
- Deckerville (Sanilac)
- Dryden (Lapeer)
- Elkton (Huron)
- Emmett (St. Clair)
- Fairgrove (Tuscola)
- Forestville (Sanilac)
- Gagetown (Tuscola)
- Harbor Beach (Huron)
- Imlay City (Lapeer)
- Kinde (Huron)
- Kingston (Tuscola)
- Lapeer (Lapeer)
- Lexington (Sanilac)
- Marine City (St. Clair)
- Marlette (Sanilac)
- Marysville (St. Clair)
- Mayville (Tuscola)
- Melvin (Sanilac)
- Memphis (St. Clair/Macomb)
- Metamora (Lapeer)
- Millington (Tuscola)
- Minden City (Sanilac)
- North Branch (Lapeer)
- Otter Lake (Lapeer/Genesee)
- Owendale (Huron)
- Peck (Sanilac)
- Pigeon (Huron)
- Port Austin (Huron)
- Port Hope (Huron)
- Port Huron (St. Clair)
- Port Sanilac (Sanilac)
- Reese (Tuscola/Saginaw)
- Richmond (Macomb/St. Clair)
- Romeo (Macomb)
- Sandusky (Sanilac)
- Sebewaing (Huron)
- St. Clair (St. Clair)
- Ubly (Huron)
- Unionville (Tuscola)
- Vassar (Tuscola)
- Yale (St. Clair)
