= Port Austin =

Port Austin may refer to a location in the United States:

- Port Austin, Michigan, a village
- Port Austin Township, Michigan
- Port Austin Lighthouse in Lake Huron north of the village
