= Hadley Hills =

Glacial moraine

Coordinates: 42°54′11.4″N 83°25′30.6″W

The Hadley Hills are a rugged glacial moraine located in The Thumb of Michigan, that extend from northern Oakland County and into southern Lapeer County.

The Hadley Hills surround the village of Hadley; The highest points and most prominent outcroppings are: Pinnacle Point at 1,262 feet (385 m), Kerr (Cemetery) Hill at 1,258 feet (383 m), both located in Hadley Township; Mt. Christie at 1,251 feet (381 m), in Metamora Township; and a point near Mayville reaching up to 1,050 feet (320 m) above sea level. Located predominately in Hadley Township in Lapeer County, the Hadley Hills are actually an extension of a much larger collection of hills which are attributed to other geologically related moraines that run in a southwesterly direction from northern Lapeer County and stretch as far south as northern Indiana and Ohio. The southern portion of this moraine system is known collectively as the Irish Hills. This glacial ridge and plateau system creates some of the highest points in southern lower Michigan, is dotted by numerous lakes, and provides the Detroit Metropolitan Area with many of its recreational areas, parks, ski resorts, and beaches, including the Ortonville Recreation Area, Metamora-Hadley Recreation Area, the Holly State Recreation Area, as well as the Mt. Holly and Pine Knob ski areas.

The Hadley Hills were created in a slightly different geologic process from the rest of the moraines in this system. The Hadley Hills are a veiki moraine, which is produced by the melting of leftover (or "dead") glacial ice, which created a plateau of glacial debris, instead of the typical glacial ridges associated with the rest of the system which were produced by the advancement and retreat of the glaciers. This accounts for the numerous basin lakes, sinkholes, and the unusual shape and rugged terrain associated with these hills.

The hills provide habitat for wildlife, and are popular with hunters and fishermen. There is also a network of trails used by hiker, snowmobilers and for horseback riding.
