= Pointe Aux Barques Township, Michigan =

- Civil township
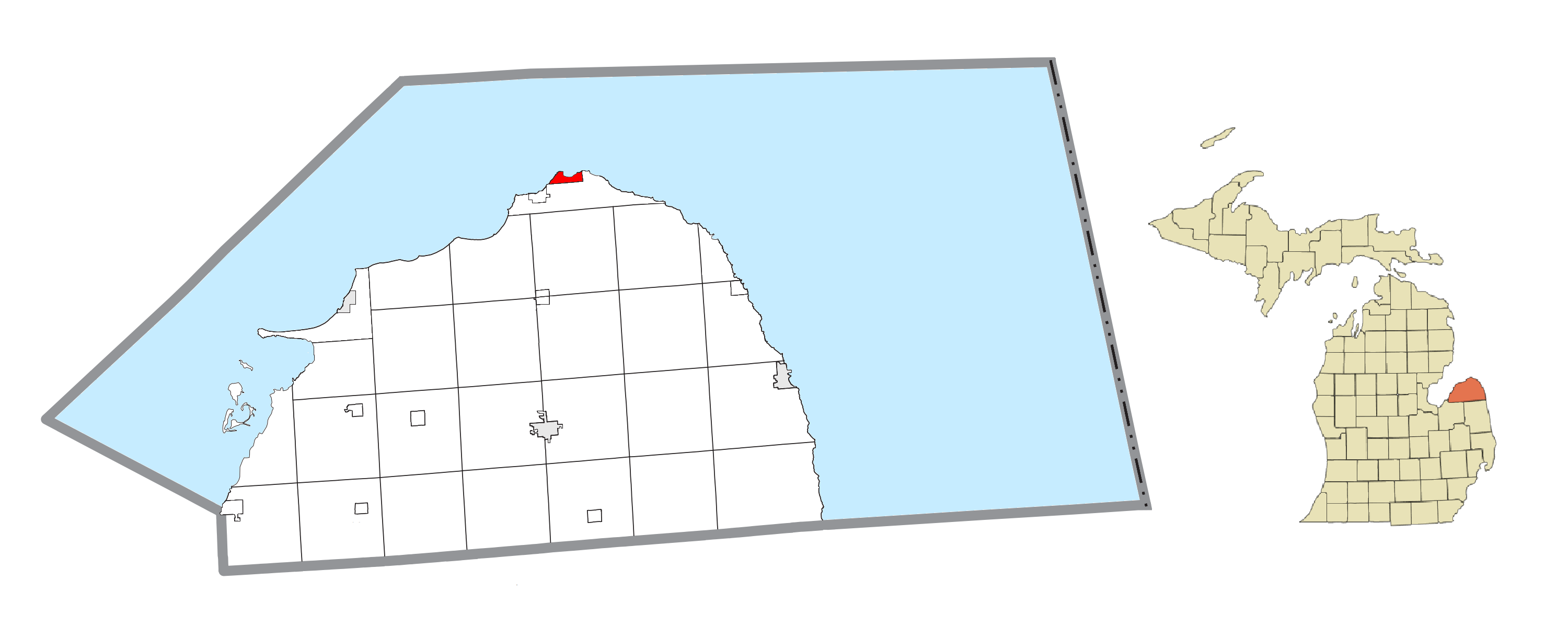
- Location within Huron County

- Location within the state of Michigan Location within the United States
- Coordinates: 44°03′41″N 82°57′00″W
- Country: United States
- State: Michigan
- County: Huron
- Organized: 1903

Government
  - Supervisor: Patricia Gotfredson
  - Clerk: Anne Milligan

Area
  - Total: 3.86 sq mi (10.00 km^{2})
  - Land: 1.31 sq mi (3.39 km^{2})
  - Water: 2.55 sq mi (6.60 km^{2})
- Elevation: 600 ft (183 m)

Population (2020)
  - Total: 15
  - Density: 11.5/sq mi (4.4/km^{2})
- Time zone: UTC-5 (Eastern (EST))
  - Summer (DST): UTC-4 (EDT)
- ZIP code(s): 48467 (Port Austin)
- Area code: 989
- FIPS code: 26-65180
- GNIS feature ID: 1626921
- Website: Official website

Pointe Aux Barques Township (/pɔɪnt ə bɑːrks/ poynt-ə-BARKS) is a civil township of Huron County in the U.S. state of Michigan. The population was 15 at the 2020 census.

Pointe Aux Barques is located at the tip of the Thumb on the Lower Peninsula. With a permanent population of only 15, the township is the least-populated municipality in the state and the third smallest township by land area after Novi Township and Royal Oak Charter Township.

== Communities ==
- Pointe Aux Barques is an unincorporated community within the township at 43°40′59″N 83°21′21″W. The name is a French translation of "point of ships" and was named by French sailors as early as 1760. The community had its own post office from June 12, 1897, until June 20, 1957.

== Geography ==
According to the U.S. Census Bureau, the township has a total area of 3.86 square miles (10.00 km^{2}), of which 1.31 square miles (3.39 km^{2}) is land and 2.55 square miles (6.60 km^{2}) is water.

The township is located at the northern end of The Thumb. Turnip Rock, an undercut stack, is located just off the shores of the mainland. Surrounded by private property, it is only accessible by water, and there is no public road access. Pointe aux Barques Light bears the name of the township but is located in neighboring Huron Township.

== Demographics ==
Historical population
Census	Pop.	Note	%±
1910	37		—
1920	34		−8.1%
1930	24		−29.4%
1940	15		−37.5%
1950	7		−53.3%
1960	52		642.9%
1970	6		−88.5%
1980	6		0.0%
1990	15		150.0%
2000	10		−33.3%
2010	10		0.0%
2020	15		50.0%
U.S. Decennial Census

As of the census of 2020, there were 15 people, 11 households, and 7 families residing in the township. There were 70 housing units, but many of them were units of secondary housing not used by full-time residents.
