= Pointe aux Barques Light =

Lighthouse in Michigan, United States

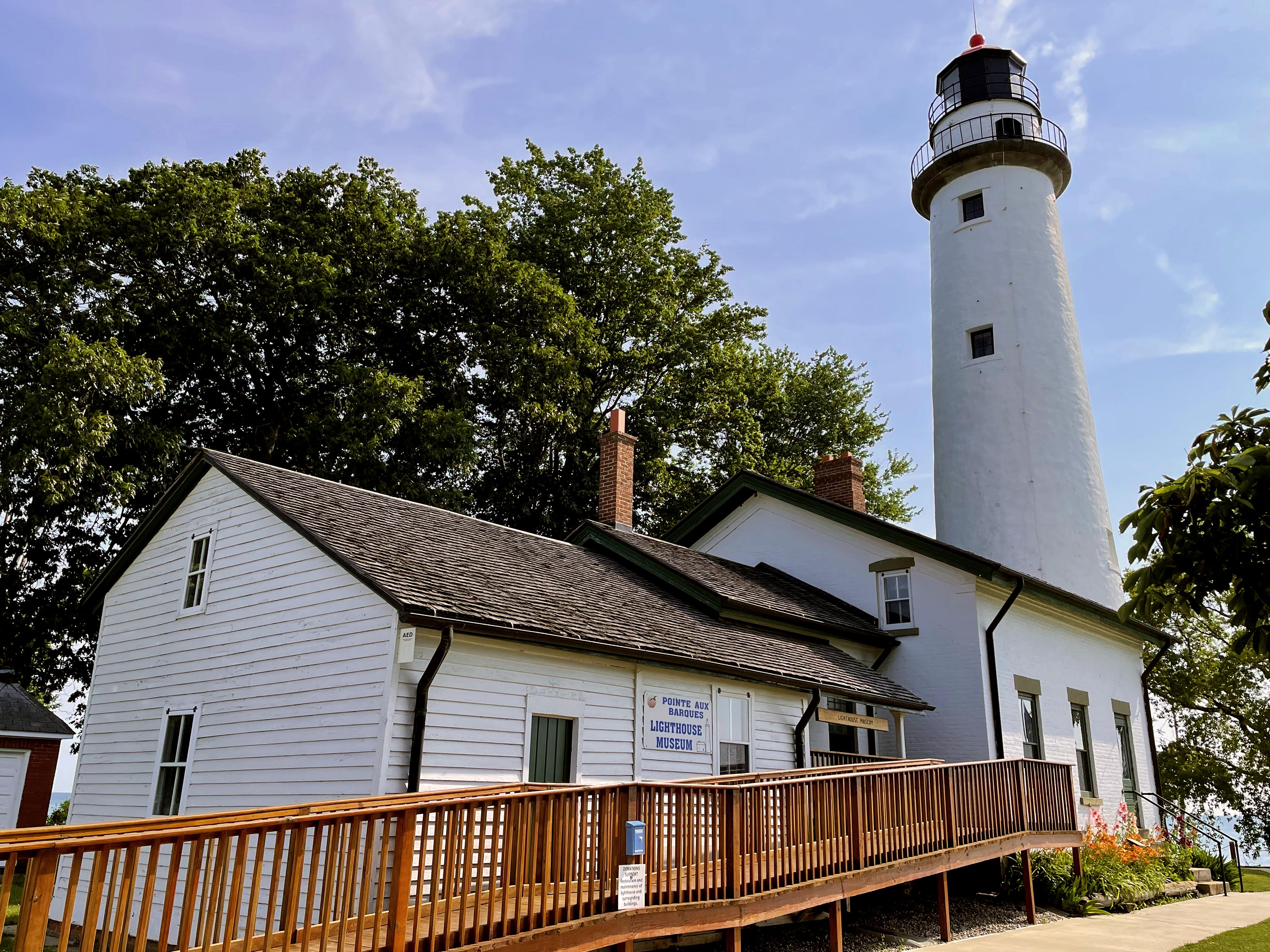
- Pointe aux Barques Light (July 2023)
- Location: Port Hope, Michigan
- Coordinates: 44°01′24″N 82°47′36″W

Tower
- Constructed: 1847 (original tower); 1857 (current tower)
- Foundation: Dressed stone and timber
- Construction: Milwaukee Cream City brick
- Automated: 1958
- Height: 89 feet (27 m)
- Shape: Conical
- Markings: White with black and red trim
- Heritage: National Register of Historic Places listed place

Light
- First lit: 1848 (original light); 1857 (current light)
- Focal height: 93 feet (28 m)
- Lens: Lewis Patent Lamp with reflector and lens (1848–1873); Third order Fresnel lens with bullseyes (1873–1969)
- Light source: Lewis Patent Lamp (1848—1914) Incandescent oil vapor lamp (1914–1932) 500W incandescent bulb (1932–1969) DCB 224 Carlisle & Finch Aerobeacon, with 1,000W (x2) Airway Beacon bulbs (1969–2015) VLB-44/2.5 Marine LED Beacon (2015–present)
- Range: 28 nautical miles (52 km; 32 mi)
- Characteristic: 0.2s fl 4.8s ec. 0.2s fl 14.8s ec.
- The Pointe aux Barques Lighthouse
- U.S. National Register of Historic Places
- Michigan State Historic Site
- Built by: Alanson Sweet, Luzene Ransom, and Morgan Shinn
- NRHP reference No.: 73000949
- Added to NRHP: March 20, 1973

Pointe aux Barques (/pɔɪnt ə bɑːrks/ point-ə-BARKS) Lighthouse and Maritime Museum is an active lighthouse and adjoining museum located in Huron County in the U.S. state of Michigan. It is located along the shores of Lake Huron on the northeastern tip of the Thumb. The current structure, built in 1857, is one of the oldest active lighthouses in the state and the site now serves as an interpretive center for the lighthouse, the nearby United States Life-Saving Service station, and local maritime history. The name is translated as "point of little boats" from the French language, which refers to the shallow coastline that poses a threat to larger boats.

== History ==
In the mid-19th century, most travel in the area was by means of sailing vessel. There were few or no roads, and only a few steamships operated on the Great Lakes. Vessels followed the coastline of the lakes until there was a need to cross a large body of water, when compass and sextant facilitated navigation.

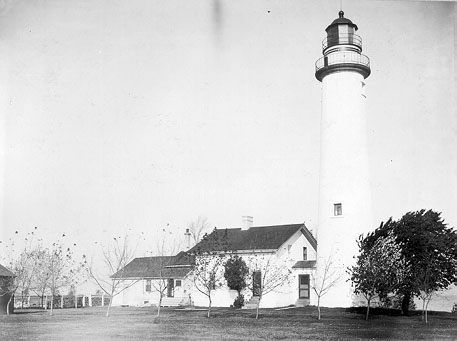
Undated USCG photo

Sailing schooners left Detroit and the St. Clair River and soon left the sight of the 1825 Fort Gratiot Light to begin the perilous trip north along the Lake Huron shore. The next light to the north was located at Thunder Bay Island (1832), more than 150 miles (240 km) north of Fort Gratiot. Any vessel sailing up the Lake Huron coast stood a good chance of running aground on the reef extending out from Pointe aux Barques. The reef, only covered by some two feet of water, extends nearly two miles into Lake Huron.

Pointe aux Barques was also used as a turning point for vessels destined for the Saginaw River. A lighthouse had been established at the mouth of the Saginaw River as early as 1841, but the trip to Saginaw Bay required steering clear of Pointe aux Barques' reef.

President James K. Polk appropriated $5,000 to build the first lighthouse structure on July 3, 1847. The first lighthouse consisted of a 65-foot free-standing conical tower and separate keeper's quarters built of local stone. The first keeper, Peter Shook, and his family took up residence in 1848. Within their first year of keeping the light, Peter Shook drowned during a supply trip, making him the first Michigan lighthouse keeper to die in service. Consequently, his widow, Catherine Shook, was appointed as Michigan's first female lighthouse keeper. The keeper's dwelling burned to the ground within weeks of her appointment, though it was rebuilt and Catherine returned as keeper for another season. Eight keepers followed her until the light was fully automated.

The condition of the original tower and keeper's dwelling had so degraded by the 1850s that a new tower, this one attached to the keeper's quarters and constructed of Milwaukee Cream City brick, was built. The present 1857 light is a conical white tower, 89 feet (27 m) tall, with a focal plane of 93 feet (28 m) above Lake Huron. A rotating Third Order Fresnel lens provided a flash every five seconds visible as far as 14 nautical miles; 26 kilometres (16 mi) out on the lake.

The new, taller light tower helped guide vessels away from the hazardous reef, but wrecks continued to occur. In 1876 a United States Life-Saving Service station was built just south of the lighthouse.

An assistant keeper's house was added in 1908, and the light was upgraded to an incandescent vapor lamp in 1914. The change increased the light's range to 18 miles (16 nmi; 29 km) over the lake, and further protection was added in 1918 with the addition of a lighted bell buoy some two and a quarter miles offshore at the end of the point.

Electrification came to Pointe aux Barques in 1932 and a 500 watt incandescent light bulb was installed into the Third Order lens. The Coast Guard assumed responsibility for the nation's aids to navigation in 1939, and the way was paved for complete automation. The signal was further improved around 1950 with the removal of the Fresnel lens and the installation of rotating DCB-224 aero beacons rated at 1,000,000 candlepower. Putting aside questions of nostalgia, aesthetics, or appreciation for the engineering of a bygone time (as exemplified by the Fresnel lens), this iteration of lighthouse illumination is itself incredibly effective, and an endangered remnant of another era.

== Michigan Historical Marker ==
On Sunday, August 5, 2007, a Michigan Historical Marker was dedicated at the grounds of the lighthouse. Cindy Krueger, an employee of the Department of History, Arts, and Libraries (HAL) and the great-great-great-granddaughter of light keepers Peter and Catherine Shook, presented the marker.

The State Historic Preservation Office, which administers the Michigan Historical Marker Program, awarded a $31,000 Michigan Lighthouse Assistance Grant to the county for a historic structures report and plans and specifications for the restoration of the lighthouse. The Michigan Lighthouse Assistance Grant is funded through the sale of the "Save our Lights" specialty license plates. The county received an additional $70,000 CMI (Clean Michigan Initiative) grant from the Department of Environmental Quality for restoration.

Since the Michigan Historical Marker Program began in 1955, the Michigan Historical Commission has placed more than 1,500 markers throughout the state. The markers are paid for with donations from sponsors who submit application packages to the State Historic Preservation Office. The Michigan Historical Commission determines the placement and wording of official state markers which are the property of the State of Michigan. The Pointe Aux Barques Lighthouse Society donated the $2,875 for the marker.

The text on the historical marker reads as follows:

The Pointe aux Barques Michigan Historical Marker.

Pointe aux Barques Lighthouse

The Pointe aux Barques Lighthouse and Lifesaving Station aided mariners for over a century, beginning in 1847. That year the U.S. Lighthouse Service built the first lighthouse on this site to mark the turning point of Lake Huron into Saginaw Bay and to warn of shallow waters. Catherine Shook became Michigan’s first female light keeper when she took over for her husband, Peter, after he drowned in 1849. In 1857, the lighthouse and dwelling were replaced with the present 89-foot tower and attached house. In 1908, the brick assistant keeper’s house was built. The lighthouse was fully automated in 1934. Five years later, the last keeper retired, and the lifesaving station, made up of 15 buildings, was decommissioned.

== Pointe aux Barques today ==
Following automation, the lighthouse grounds were turned over to Huron County. The transfer was completed in June, 2003. The 1857 tower and attached keeper's dwelling remain intact, along with the 1908 assistant keeper's dwelling, an 1892 oil house, and a 1908 outhouse. The keeper's dwelling is home to a museum. One room contains memorabilia of the lighthouse, its history, and keepers. Many original documents and pictures are on display. The light's original Third Order Fresnel lens has been returned to the museum. Another room interprets the many shipwrecks that lie under the local waters. The tower continues to be an active aid to navigation and is open to the public only a few times during the season.

In October–November 2017, two Life-Saving Service structures were moved to sit about 100 feet from the Pointe aux Barques Lighthouse and set on new foundations. The two buildings were originally constructed along the shore about 1,000 feet south-by-southeast of their current location, having been moved to the Huron City Historic District in 1964.

A campground was established near the light station in the area where the 1876 United States Life-Saving Service (USLSS) station was originally located.

A group of students from Western Michigan University performed an archeological dig at the site in 2003. They unearthed evidence of an 1840s lighthouse structure that preceded the 1857 building.

In 1972, the lighthouse was listed in the National Register of Historic Places, Reference #73000949. The lighthouse was repaired extensively in 2005. In 2008, an exterior historical restoration project was successfully completed by National Restoration, Inc.

The Pointe aux Barques Maritime Museum Society (PaBMMS), founded in 2002 as the Pointe aux Barques Lighthouse Society (PaBLS), is dedicated to preserving and restoring the light station and museum.

== Location ==
Located off M-25, seven miles (11 km) north of Port Hope and 11 miles (18 km) south of Port Austin on Lighthouse Road. Visitors can easily spend the better part of a day touring the lighthouse grounds and museum or just enjoying the beauty of the Lake Huron shore.

== See also ==
- Great Lakes Storm of 1913
- Lighthouses in the United States
- The Michigan Historical Marker Web Site
- Port Hope's Pointe aux Barques Lighthouse to Receive Michigan Historical Marker Aug. 5
- National Restoration, Inc.
- Shipwrecks of the 1913 Great Lakes storm
