= Turnip Rock =

Geological formation

- Stack
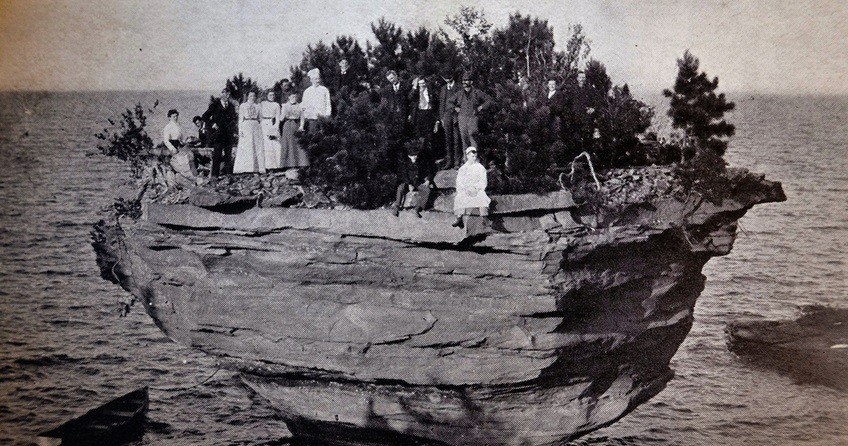
- Turnip Rock in 1906; today the trees are much taller

- Location in Michigan
- Coordinates: 44°04′06.04″N 82°57′32.69″W
- Location: Pointe Aux Barques Township, Michigan
- Offshore water bodies: Alaska Bay, Lake Huron

Turnip Rock is a small geological formation in Michigan. It is a stack located in Lake Huron, in shallow water a few yards offshore, near the rock called the Thumbnail which is the extreme tip of Pointe Aux Barques, a small peninsula in Pointe Aux Barques Township which in turn is the extreme tip of The Thumb, a large peninsula comprising several counties in eastern Michigan.

Turnip Rock has been severely undercut by wave action, so that its top has a significantly larger cross-section than its base. Its consequent unusual form, reminiscent of a turnip, has made it a popular tourist attraction, although it is located entirely on private property. The only access to Turnip Rock is by water, and there is no public road access. A concrete collar has been built around the base of Turnip Rock at the waterline to stop further undercutting.

Turnip Rock was one of twenty finalists in the 2013 "Seven Wonders of Michigan" contest sponsored by the Detroit Free Press and the Lansing State Journal, but wasn't selected as one of the final seven.
