= Port Austin Light =

Lighthouse in Michigan, United States

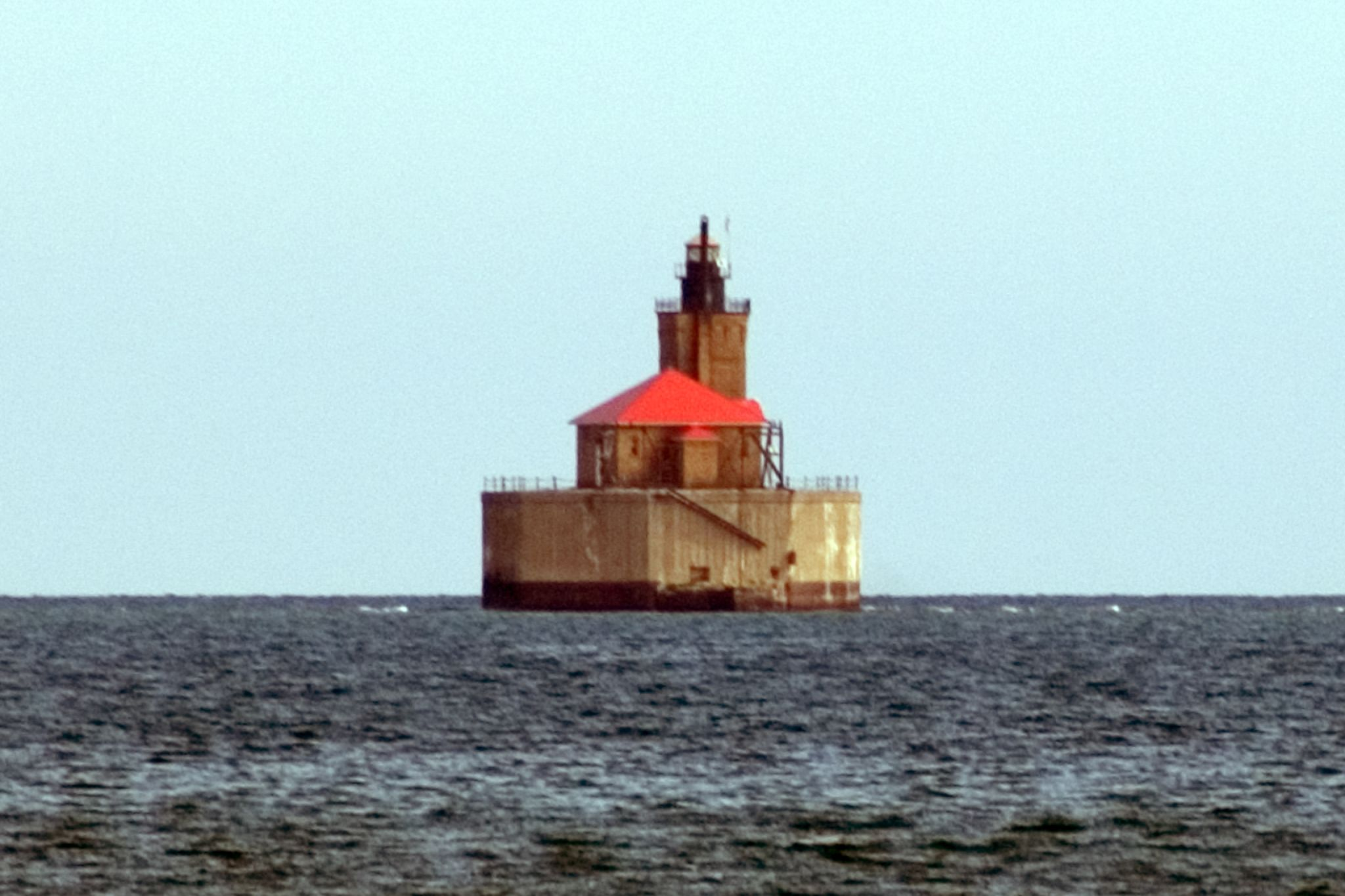
- Location: Port Austin Reef, 2.5 miles (4.0 km) north of Port Austin, Michigan (Port aux Barques Township)
- Coordinates: 44°05′N 82°59′W

Tower
- Constructed: 1878
- Foundation: Brick, cement, crushed stone
- Construction: Brick
- Automated: 1953
- Height: 60 feet (18 m)
- Shape: Square
- Markings: Buff square tower with attached house w/red roof.
- Heritage: National Register of Historic Places listed place

Light
- First lit: 1878
- Focal height: 76 feet (23 m)
- Lens: Fourth order Fresnel lens (original), 12-inch (300 mm) Tideland Signal ML-300 acrylic (current)
- Range: 8 nautical miles (15 km; 9.2 mi) Other sources claim 14.3 nautical miles; 26.6 kilometres (16.5 mi)
- Characteristic: White, every 6 seconds.
- Port Austin Reef Light
- U.S. National Register of Historic Places
- MPS: Light Stations of the United States MPS
- NRHP reference No.: 11000666
- Added to NRHP: September 15, 2011

Port Austin Lighthouse (or Port Austin Reef Light) is a lighthouse off the shore of Lake Huron, about 2.5 miles (4.0 km) north of Port Austin, Huron County Michigan sitting on a rocky reef (shoal), which is just north of the tip of the Thumb and a real hazard to navigation.

== History ==
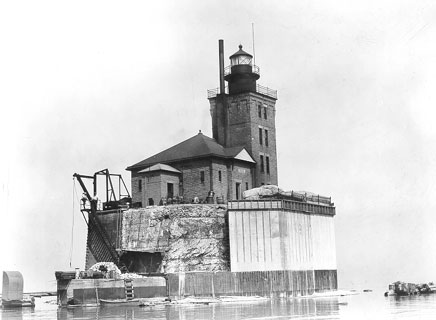

The original plans were for this lighthouse to be built on shore. The crib was built in Tawas.

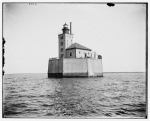

The light was first lit in 1878, and its pier was modified in 1899. It is still operational and is automated. The foundation materials are a pier, and the tower is constructed of yellow brick, with buff markings. It is an octagonal, 60-foot (18 m) tall tower, with an attached keeper house. However, the focal plain is 76 feet (23 m). It originally had a fourth-order Fresnel lens by Henry Lepaute of Paris and installed in 1899. The optic was 12-inch (300 mm) glass. In 1985 the lens was replaced by a 12-volt solar-powered Tideland Signal 300 mm acrylic optic, which eliminated the need to maintain the submarine cable.

== Current status and activities ==
In 1990, volunteers from the Port Austin Reef Light Association engaged in an "heroic effort" to oust a colony of seagulls that had taken over the building, and then screened and reroofed it. Restoration efforts continue. Decking has been covered with galvanized metal shingles, and painted in the bright red that is historically accurate. Railings were affixed to the access ladder, and safety chains edging the deck were replaced. Installed also were a new brick chimney and 18 new windows. In 1990, PARLA's license to renovate the structure was extended through 2020.

Current restoration continues by the Port Austin Reef Light Association.

As of July 2026, the light is open for tours. It is a long and difficult trip to the light, which is always hindered by the reef, and often by the fog. In addition, it is possible to photograph the lighthouse from shore, although it takes a long lens or digital zoom.

The light was listed on the National Register of Historic Places in September 2011. The site includes adjacent bottom lands. A two-story on shore lighthouse keeper's house still exists.

In June 2011, the General Services Administration made the Port Austin Light (along with 11 others) available at no cost to public organizations willing to preserve them.

On July 19, 2012 it was announced that the Port Austin Reef Lighthouse Association, a Michigan non-profit organization, will take ownership of the Port Austin Light Station on Lake Huron.

== See also ==
- Lighthouses in the United States
