= Melvin, Michigan =

- Village
- Location of Melvin, Michigan
- Coordinates: 43°11′5″N 82°51′48″W
- Country: United States
- State: Michigan
- County: Sanilac
- Township: Speaker

Area
  - Total: 0.97 sq mi (2.52 km^{2})
  - Land: 0.97 sq mi (2.52 km^{2})
  - Water: 0 sq mi (0.00 km^{2})
- Elevation: 833 ft (254 m)

Population (2020)
  - Total: 148
  - Density: 152.4/sq mi (58.84/km^{2})
- Time zone: UTC-5 (Eastern (EST))
  - Summer (DST): UTC-4 (EDT)
- ZIP code: 48454
- Area code: 810
- FIPS code: 26-52920
- GNIS feature ID: 0632084

Melvin is a village in Sanilac County in the U.S. state of Michigan. The population was 148 at the 2020 census. The village is within Speaker Township, and is located within the Thumb Region of Michigan.

== Geography ==
According to the United States Census Bureau, the village has a total area of 0.97 square miles (2.51 km^{2}), all land.

== Demographics ==
Historical population
Census	Pop.	Note	%±
1910	242		—
1920	169		−30.2%
1930	168		−0.6%
1940	152		−9.5%
1950	204		34.2%
1960	196		−3.9%
1970	202		3.1%
1980	171		−15.3%
1990	148		−13.5%
2000	160		8.1%
2010	180		12.5%
2020	148		−17.8%
U.S. Decennial Census

=== 2010 census ===
As of the census of 2010, there were 180 people, 62 households, and 50 families living in the village. The population density was 185.6 inhabitants per square mile (71.7/km^{2}). There were 73 housing units at an average density of 75.3 per square mile (29.1/km^{2}). The racial makeup of the village was 96.1% White, 0.6% African American, 1.7% Native American, and 1.7% from two or more races.

There were 62 households, of which 46.8% had children under the age of 18 living with them, 58.1% were married couples living together, 14.5% had a female householder with no husband present, 8.1% had a male householder with no wife present, and 19.4% were non-families. 16.1% of all households were made up of individuals, and 6.5% had someone living alone who was 65 years of age or older. The average household size was 2.90 and the average family size was 3.24.

The median age in the village was 36 years. 32.8% of residents were under the age of 18; 6.1% were between the ages of 18 and 24; 21.2% were from 25 to 44; 29.4% were from 45 to 64; and 10.6% were 65 years of age or older. The gender makeup of the village was 52.2% male and 47.8% female.

=== 2000 census ===
As of the census of 2000, there were 160 people, 64 households, and 44 families living in the village. The population density was 162.0 inhabitants per square mile (62.5/km^{2}). There were 73 housing units at an average density of 73.9 per square mile (28.5/km^{2}). The racial makeup of the village was 98.12% White and 1.88% Native American. Hispanic or Latino of any race were 1.25% of the population.

There were 64 households, out of which 32.8% had children under the age of 18 living with them, 62.5% were married couples living together, 3.1% had a female householder with no husband present, and 29.7% were non-families. 26.6% of all households were made up of individuals, and 10.9% had someone living alone who was 65 years of age or older. The average household size was 2.50 and the average family size was 3.02.

In the village, the population was spread out, with 25.0% under the age of 18, 6.3% from 18 to 24, 28.8% from 25 to 44, 21.3% from 45 to 64, and 18.8% who were 65 years of age or older. The median age was 38 years. For every 100 females, there were 100.0 males. For every 100 females age 18 and over, there were 114.3 males.

The median income for a household in the village was $28,333, and the median income for a family was $30,833. Males had a median income of $26,250 versus $21,250 for females. The per capita income for the village was $13,646. About 11.1% of families and 12.4% of the population were below the poverty line, including 15.4% of those under the age of eighteen and 6.1% of those 65 or over.
