= Metamora-Hadley Recreation Area =

Protected area in Michigan, United States

Metamora-Hadley State Recreation Area
- Location within Michigan Location within the United States
- Location: Lower Peninsula, Lapeer County, Michigan USA
- Nearest city: Lapeer, Michigan
- Coordinates: 42°56′10″N 83°20′12″W
- Area: 723 acres (293 ha)
- Governing body: Michigan Department of Natural Resources
- Website: Official website

Metamora-Hadley State Recreation Area is a state-managed protected area in the U.S. state of Michigan, located in Hadley Township in Lapeer County, northwest of Detroit. It is located eight miles south of the city of Lapeer. The closest urban community is the village of Metamora, Michigan, which lies to its east and is used in its postal address.

The park is 723 acres (2.93 km^{2}) in area and has 214 camping sites distributed across a "north" and "south" campground, and one cabin. The north campground has larger lots which can accommodate larger trailers than the south campground. There is a six-mile (10 km) nature trail, as well as picnic areas, a beach with boat rentals, and a camp store. The recreation area lies around Lake Minnewanna, an 80-acre (320,000 m^{2}) man-made lake.

== History ==
In its first stages, Metamora-Hadley was laid out differently from today. The original beach was where the current north campground is, and the present-day beach was forest. The drive behind the campground host spot was the original location of the dumping station. Lake Minnewanna was made by damming the creek that flows through the area.
