= Ortonville Recreation Area =

Park in Lapeer County, Michigan, United States of America

Ortonville State Recreation Area
- Location within Michigan Location within the United States
- Location: Brandon Township, Oakland County, Hadley Township, Lapeer County, Michigan, USA
- Nearest city: Ortonville, Michigan
- Coordinates: 42°53′55″N 83°25′54″W
- Area: 5,400 acres (2,185 ha)
- Governing body: Michigan Department of Natural Resources
- Website: Official website

Ortonville State Recreation Area is a 5,400-acre (2,200 ha) recreation area, located in Oakland County and Lapeer County, Michigan.

== Facilities ==
- Beach House
- Boat Launch
- Campground - 25 Equestrian Sites, 1 Cabin
- Picnic Area
- Picnic Shelter - Reservation required
- Playground
- Shooting Range

== Activities ==
- Cross Country Skiing - 2.5 miles (4.0 km)
- Fishing
- Hiking - 3.5 miles (5.6 km)
- Horseback Riding - 6.5 miles (10.5 km)
- Hunting
- Metal Detecting
- Mountain Biking - 3.5 miles (5.6 km)
- Orienteering
- Snow-mobiling - 6.5 miles (10.5 km)
- Swimming
