= Port Austin Township, Michigan =

- Civil township
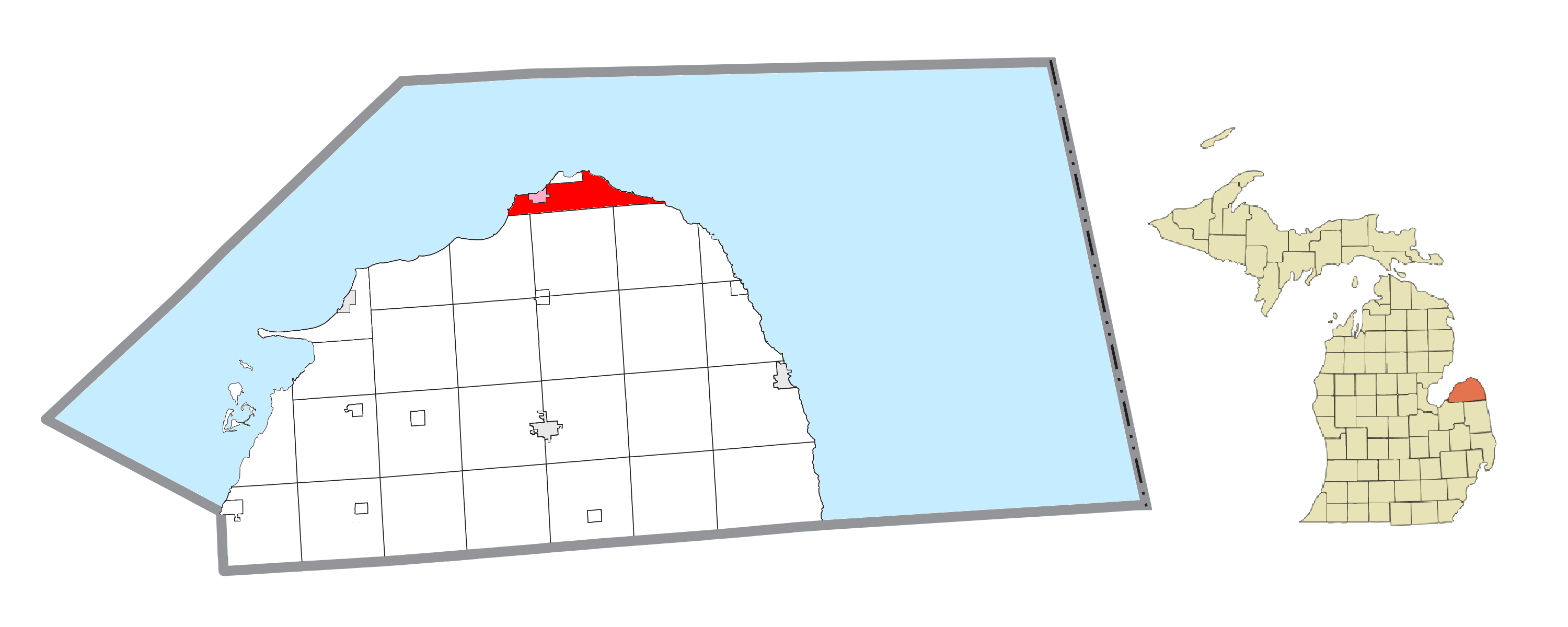
- Location within Huron County (red) and the administered village of Port Austin (pink)

- Location within the state of Michigan Port Austin Township (the United States)
- Coordinates: 44°02′35″N 82°56′51″W
- Country: United States
- State: Michigan
- County: Huron

Government
  - Supervisor: Brandt Rousseaux

Area
  - Total: 16.7 sq mi (43.2 km^{2})
  - Land: 16.4 sq mi (42.5 km^{2})
  - Water: 0.27 sq mi (0.7 km^{2})
- Elevation: 630 ft (192 m)

Population (2020)
  - Total: 1,384
  - Density: 84.3/sq mi (32.6/km^{2})
- Time zone: UTC-5 (Eastern (EST))
  - Summer (DST): UTC-4 (EDT)
- ZIP code(s): 48467
- Area code: 989
- FIPS code: 26-65700
- GNIS feature ID: 1626928
- Website: Official website

Port Austin Township is a civil township of Huron County in the U.S. state of Michigan. The population was 1,384 at the 2020 census.

== Communities ==
- The Village of Port Austin is at the western end of the township on M-25 and at the northern terminus of M-53.
- Grindstone City is an unincorporated community in the eastern end of the township at 44°03′01″N 82°54′03″W. It was established in 1834.

== Geography ==
According to the United States Census Bureau, the township has a total area of 16.7 square miles (43 km^{2}), of which 16.4 square miles (42 km^{2}) is land and 0.3 square miles (0.78 km^{2}) (1.56%) is water.

== Demographics ==
As of the census of 2000, there were 1,591 people, 760 households, and 471 families residing in the township. The population density was 97.0 inhabitants per square mile (37.5/km^{2}). There were 1,690 housing units at an average density of 103.0 per square mile (39.8/km^{2}). The racial makeup of the township was 98.49% White, 0.13% African American, 0.19% Native American, 0.19% Asian, 0.06% Pacific Islander, 0.19% from other races, and 0.75% from two or more races. Hispanic or Latino of any race were 1.38% of the population.

There were 760 households, out of which 17.9% had children under the age of 18 living with them, 52.6% were married couples living together, 7.1% had a female householder with no husband present, and 38.0% were non-families. 35.4% of all households were made up of individuals, and 18.7% had someone living alone who was 65 years of age or older. The average household size was 2.07 and the average family size was 2.63.

In the township the population was spread out, with 16.7% under the age of 18, 4.7% from 18 to 24, 17.9% from 25 to 44, 33.1% from 45 to 64, and 27.7% who were 65 years of age or older. The median age was 52 years. For every 100 females, there were 91.7 males. For every 100 females age 18 and over, there were 90.2 males.

The median income for a household in the township was $32,841, and the median income for a family was $39,554. Males had a median income of $30,563 versus $25,000 for females. The per capita income for the township was $19,219. About 11.1% of families and 12.9% of the population were below the poverty line, including 10.8% of those under age 18 and 12.1% of those age 65 or over.
