= Hadley Township, Michigan =

- Civil township
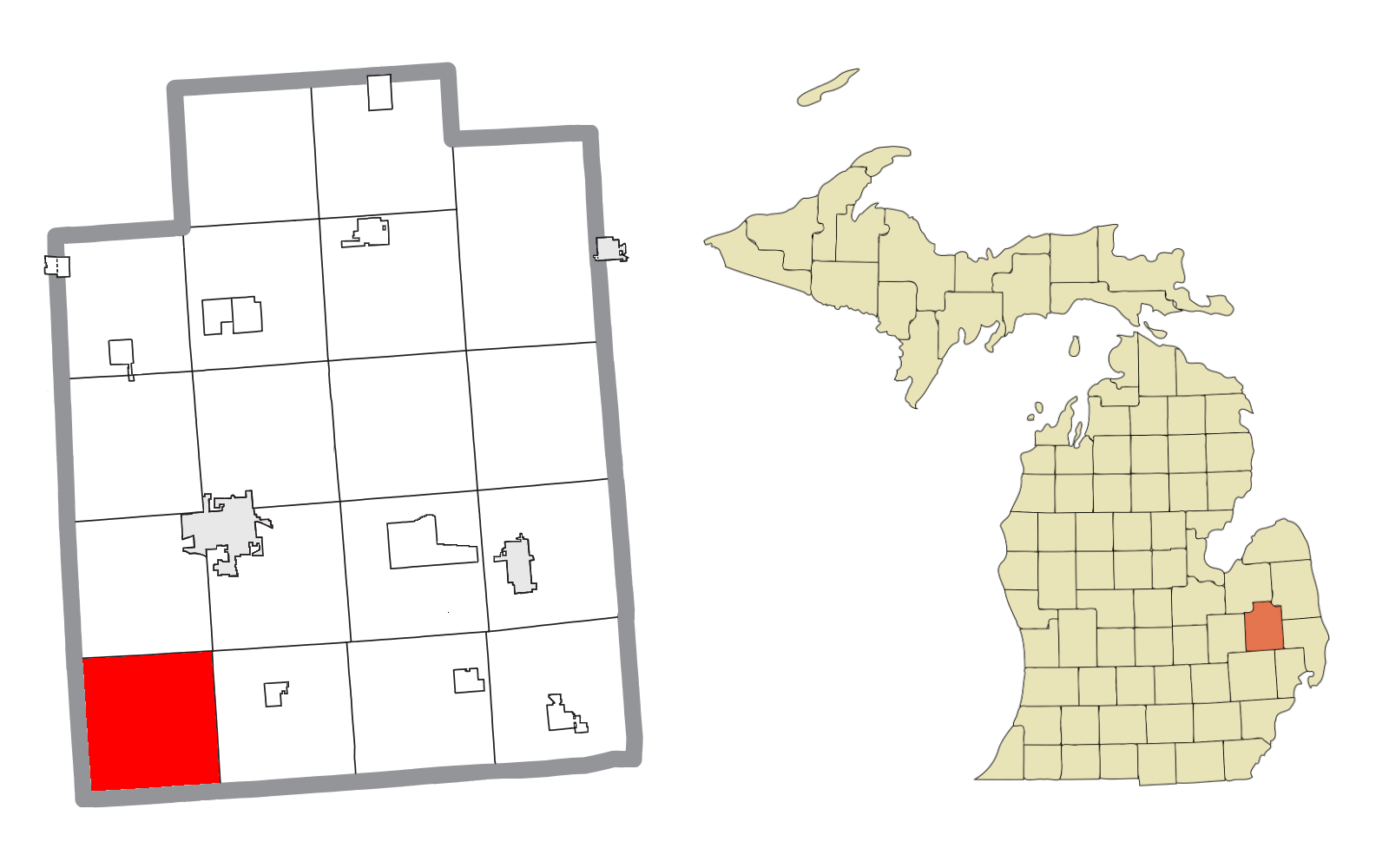
- Location within Lapeer County

- Location within the state of Michigan Location within the United States
- Coordinates: 42°55′33″N 83°24′09″W
- Country: United States
- State: Michigan
- County: Lapeer
- Organized: March 1836

Area
  - Total: 36.1 sq mi (93.4 km^{2})
  - Land: 35.3 sq mi (91.4 km^{2})
  - Water: 0.77 sq mi (2.0 km^{2})
- Elevation: 928 ft (283 m)

Population (2020)
  - Total: 4,547
  - Density: 129/sq mi (49.7/km^{2})
- Time zone: UTC-5 (Eastern (EST))
  - Summer (DST): UTC-4 (EDT)
- ZIP code: 48440 (Hadley P.O. Box), 48455 (Metamora), 48446 (Lapeer), 48438 (Goodrich), 48462 (Ortonville), 48371 (Oxford)
- Area code: 810
- FIPS code: 26-35840
- GNIS feature ID: 1626417
- Website: https://hadleytownship.org/

Hadley Township (/ˈhædliː/, HAD-lee) is a civil township of Lapeer County in the U.S. state of Michigan. The population was 4,547 at the 2020 Census.

== Communities ==
- Cadyville was the area around a school house built in 1838. Starting in 1842, it had its own school district covering the southwest portion of the township, but was later absorbed by other school districts.
- Farmers Creek is an unincorporated community at 42°57′46″N 83°20′24″W on the boundary between Metamora Township on the east and Hadley Township to the west. It was named for the nearby stream. John L. Morse purchased land here in 1833 and settled in 1834. Brother John and Henry M. Look also settled here in 1834. Morse became the first postmaster on January 3, 1836, and the office operated until September 30, 1903.
- Hadley is an unincorporated community in the northern part of the township at 42°57′16″N 83°24′12″W. William Hart, Abraham Tunison, and Charles L. Cambell settled here in 1835. A post office opened on May 7, 1838, with John Mills, Jr. as the first postmaster. Circa 1907, Franklin Hadley became postmaster and for fifty years some member of the Hadley family held the office. The Hadley post office, with ZIP code 48440, provide P.O. box service to a small area within the township.
- Kerr Hill is identified as a populated place by the USGS GNIS at 42°53′46″N 83°23′46″W.
- The village of Metamora is to the east, and the Metamora post office, with ZIP code 48455, also serves much of northern and eastern Hadley Township.
- The city of Lapeer is to the north-northeast, and the Lapeer post office, with ZIP code 48446, also serves a small portion of northwestern Hadley Township.
- The village of Goodrich is to the west in Genesee County, and the Goodrich post office, with ZIP code 48438, also serves a portion of southwest Hadley Township.
- The village of Ortonville is to the south-southwest in Oakland County, and the Ortonville post office, with ZIP code 48462, also serves portions of southern Hadley Township.
- The village of Oxford is to the southeast in Oakland County, and the Oxford post office, with ZIP code 48371, also serves a small portion of southeast Hadley Township.

== Geography ==
According to the United States Census Bureau, the township has a total area of 36.0 square miles (93 km^{2}), of which 35.3 square miles (91 km^{2}) is land and 0.8 square miles (2.1 km^{2}) (2.14%) is water.

== Demographics ==
As of the census of 2000, there were 4,655 people, 1,573 households, and 1,338 families residing in the township. The population density was 131.9 inhabitants per square mile (50.9/km^{2}). There were 1,646 housing units at an average density of 46.7 per square mile (18.0/km^{2}). The racial makeup of the township was 98.17% White, 0.04% African American, 0.28% Native American, 0.34% Asian, 0.24% from other races, and 0.92% from two or more races. Hispanic or Latino of any race were 1.14% of the population.

There were 1,573 households, out of which 39.6% had children under the age of 18 living with them, 77.5% were married couples living together, 3.8% had a female householder with no husband present, and 14.9% were non-families. 11.5% of all households were made up of individuals, and 3.2% had someone living alone who was 65 years of age or older. The average household size was 2.95 and the average family size was 3.21.

In the township the population was spread out, with 28.0% under the age of 18, 6.6% from 18 to 24, 29.9% from 25 to 44, 28.3% from 45 to 64, and 7.2% who were 65 years of age or older. The median age was 38 years. For every 100 females, there were 108.0 males. For every 100 females age 18 and over, there were 107.7 males.

The median income for a household in the township was $72,381, and the median income for a family was $77,006. Males had a median income of $56,000 versus $36,328 for females. The per capita income for the township was $26,859. About 1.3% of families and 1.4% of the population were below the poverty line, including 1.3% of those under age 18 and none of those age 65 or over.

== Climate ==
This climatic region is typified by large seasonal temperature differences, with warm to hot (and often humid) summers and cold (sometimes severely cold) winters. According to the Köppen Climate Classification system, Hadley has a humid continental climate, abbreviated "Dfb" on climate maps.

== Notable people ==
- Louis C. Cramton, US Representative
