= Port Austin, Michigan =

- Village
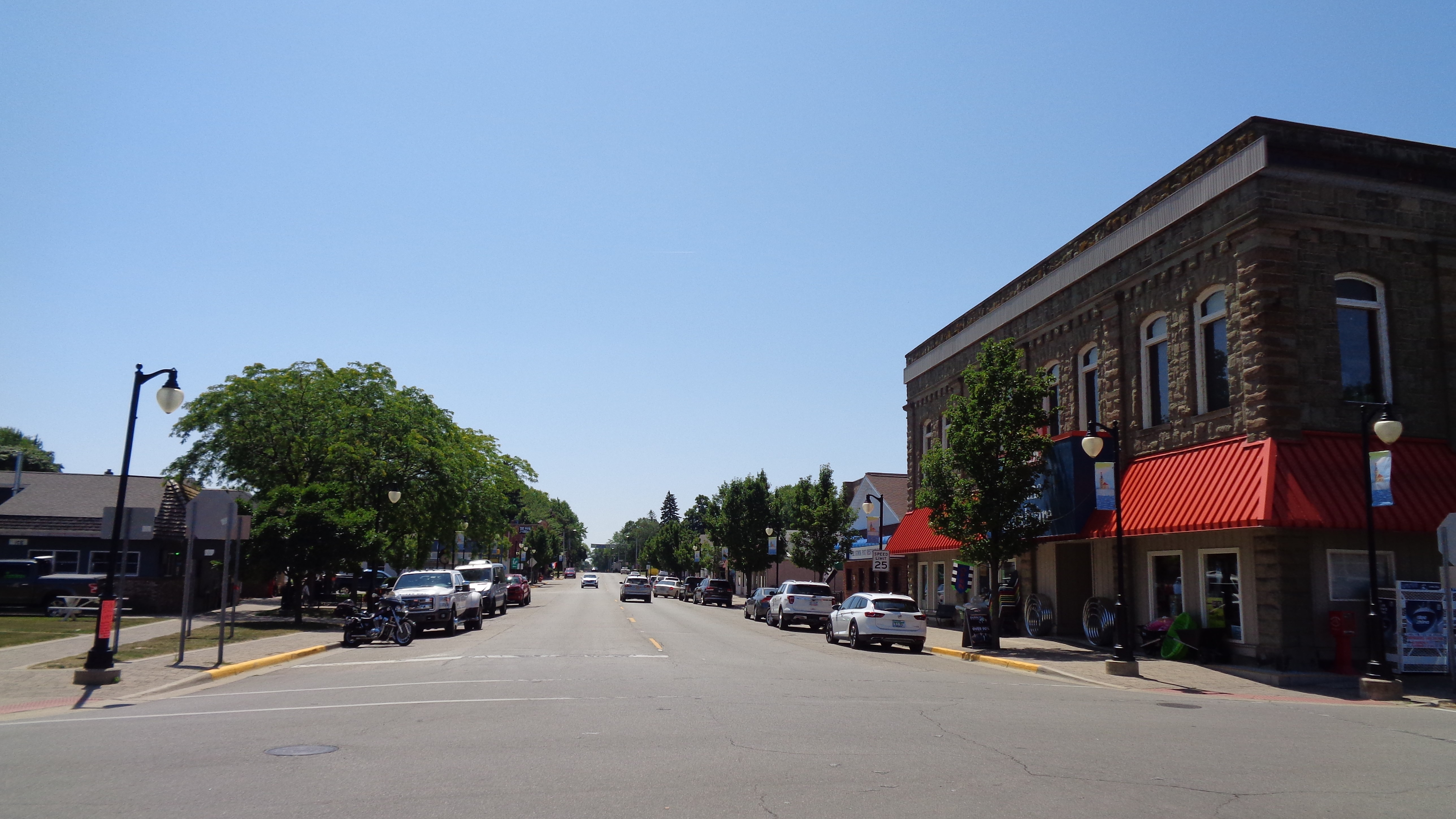
- Looking south along the terminus of M-53 with the concurrency of M-25

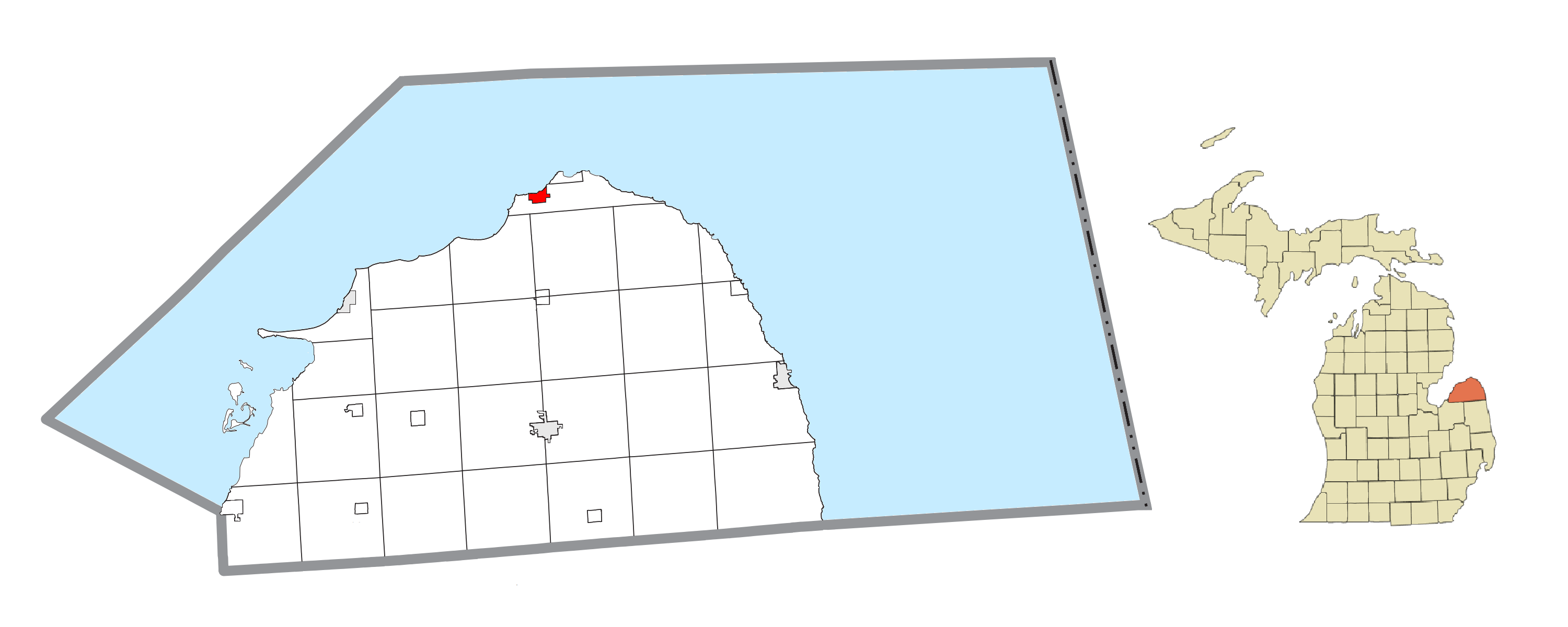
- Location within Huron County

- Location within the state of Michigan
- Coordinates: 44°02′43″N 82°59′40″W
- Country: United States
- State: Michigan
- County: Huron
- Township: Port Austin

Area
  - Total: 1.00 sq mi (2.60 km^{2})
  - Land: 0.99 sq mi (2.56 km^{2})
  - Water: 0.015 sq mi (0.04 km^{2})
- Elevation: 597 ft (182 m)

Population (2020)
  - Total: 622
  - Density: 630.0/sq mi (243.26/km^{2})
- Time zone: UTC-5 (Eastern (EST))
  - Summer (DST): UTC-4 (EDT)
- ZIP code(s): 48467
- Area code: 989
- FIPS code: 26-65680
- GNIS feature ID: 0635259
- Website: Official website

Port Austin is a village in Huron County in the U.S. state of Michigan. As of the 2020 census, Port Austin had a population of 622. The village is within Port Austin Township.

== Geography ==
- According to the United States Census Bureau, the village has a total area of 1.04 square miles (2.69 km^{2}), of which 1.03 square miles (2.67 km^{2}) is land and 0.01 square miles (0.03 km^{2}) is water.
- It is located at the tip of the Thumb of Michigan. Port Austin is home to a rock formation known as Turnip Rock, found to the northeast of town on Point Aux Barques. Nearby is Port Crescent State Park, which has one of Michigan's finest sand beaches.

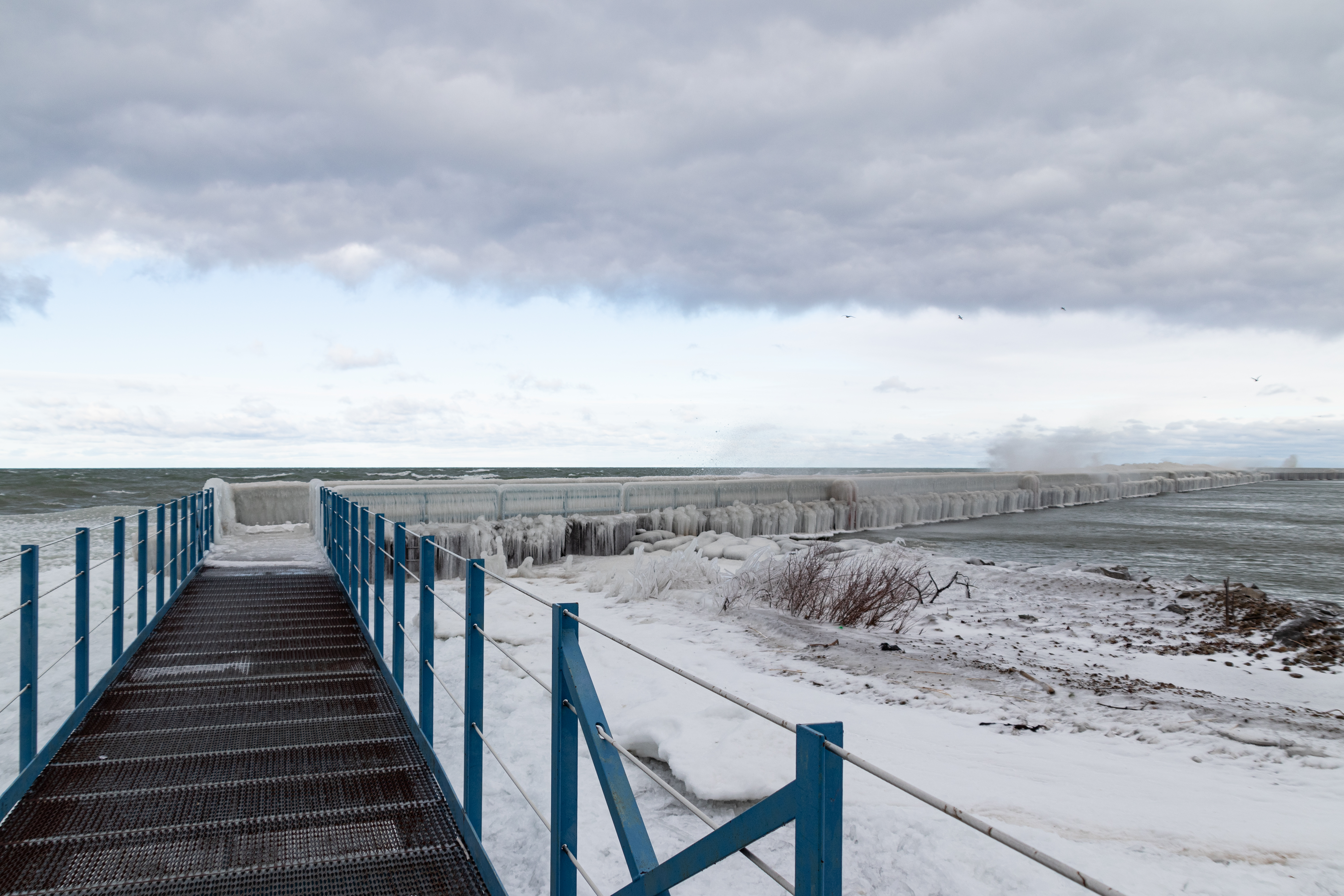
A view from Port Austin Breakwater Pier, with ice freezing over during the winter.

== Demographics ==
Historical population
Census	Pop.	Note	%±
1880	757		—
1890	571		−24.6%
1900	507		−11.2%
1910	533		5.1%
1920	410		−23.1%
1930	503		22.7%
1940	517		2.8%
1950	724		40.0%
1960	706		−2.5%
1970	883		25.1%
1980	839		−5.0%
1990	815		−2.9%
2000	737		−9.6%
2010	664		−9.9%
2020	622		−6.3%
U.S. Decennial Census

=== 2010 census ===
As of the census of 2010, there were 664 people, 338 households, and 168 families living in the village. The population density was 644.7 inhabitants per square mile (248.9/km^{2}). There were 724 housing units at an average density of 702.9 per square mile (271.4/km^{2}). The racial makeup of the village was 96.1% White, 0.2% African American, 0.2% Native American, 1.1% Asian, 0.6% Pacific Islander, 0.5% from other races, and 1.5% from two or more races. Hispanic or Latino of any race were 1.7% of the population.

There were 338 households, of which 16.6% had children under the age of 18 living with them, 36.7% were married couples living together, 10.7% had a female householder with no husband present, 2.4% had a male householder with no wife present, and 50.3% were non-families. 43.5% of all households were made up of individuals, and 22.8% had someone living alone who was 65 years of age or older. The average household size was 1.91 and the average family size was 2.59.

The median age in the village was 55.4 years. 14.6% of residents were under the age of 18; 4.3% were between the ages of 18 and 24; 16.1% were from 25 to 44; 34.8% were from 45 to 64; and 30.3% were 65 years of age or older. The gender makeup of the village was 49.7% male and 50.3% female.

=== 2000 census ===
As of the census of 2000, there were 737 people, 370 households, and 206 families living in the village. The population density was 733.7 inhabitants per square mile (283.3/km^{2}). There were 622 housing units at an average density of 619.2 per square mile (239.1/km^{2}). The racial makeup of the village was 97.96% White, 0.27% African American, 0.27% Native American, 0.14% Asian, 0.27% from other races, and 1.09% from two or more races. Hispanic or Latino of any race were 0.68% of the population.

There were 370 households, out of which 16.5% had children under the age of 18 living with them, 44.9% were married couples living together, 8.9% had a female householder with no husband present, and 44.3% were non-families. 41.4% of all households were made up of individuals, and 21.4% had someone living alone who was 65 years of age or older. The average household size was 1.94 and the average family size was 2.58.

In the village, the population was spread out, with 15.5% under the age of 18, 5.0% from 18 to 24, 17.9% from 25 to 44, 31.6% from 45 to 64, and 30.0% who were 65 years of age or older. The median age was 52 years. For every 100 females, there were 79.8 males. For every 100 females age 18 and over, there were 80.6 males.

The median income for a household in the village was $29,643, and the median income for a family was $38,000. Males had a median income of $26,875 versus $23,750 for females. The per capita income for the village was $18,480. About 12.2% of families and 14.3% of the population were below the poverty line, including 15.3% of those under age 18 and 16.4% of those age 65 or over.

== Notable people ==
- V. Floyd Campbell, illustrator and caricaturist; born in Port Austin
- Napoleon Chagnon, anthropologist; born in Port Austin
