= Thumb Area Bottomland Preserve =

Protected area in Michigan, US

- Location within Michigan
- Location: Lake Huron, Huron County, Michigan USA
- Nearest city: Port Austin, Michigan
- Coordinates: 44.0232°N 82.771°W
- Area: 276 square miles (710 km^{2})
- Governing body: Michigan Department of Natural Resources

The Thumb Area Bottomland Preserve, also called the Thumb Area Underwater Preserve, is a preservation area in Lake Huron in the U.S. state of Michigan. It is 276 square miles (710 km^{2}) in size and is located off Michigan's Thumb north of Detroit.

== Description ==
The Thumb Area Bottomland Preserve protects bottomlands off Pointe aux Barques and the beach port towns of Harbor Beach, Huron City, and Port Austin. The Michigan Department of Environmental Quality has counted 10 known shipwrecks within the boundaries protected by the preserve.

Two package freighters, Philadelphia and Albany sank after colliding off Pointe Aux Barques in 1893.

As in most of the Great Lakes, most of the shipwrecks predate the consolidation of federal marine safety services into the United States Coast Guard in 1915.

The foundered SS Daniel J. Morrell, a lake freighter which split in two and sank in 1966 with a loss of 28 lives, also lies off the shore of Michigan's Thumb, but outside the boundaries of the preserve.

The preserve protects a network of limestone sea caves off Port Austin. Near Port Austin is the largely depopulated former town of Grindstone City, where grindstones were quarried. Some of the specialized stones were lost overboard near the quarries and can be seen underwater as of 2009.
