= SS Philadelphia (1867) =

American package freighter (1867–1893)

Coordinates: 44°4′7.2″N 82°42′59.52″W

History

United States
- Name: Philadelphia
- Operator: Erie & Western Transportation Company
- Port of registry: Buffalo, New York
- Builder: David Bell
- Cost: $160,000 ($3.03 million in 2025)
- Laid down: February 1867
- Launched: 5 December 1867
- Out of service: 7 November 1893
- Identification: US official number 20142
- Fate: Sank in a collision with the package freighter Albany
- Notes: Second metal–hulled freighter built on the Great Lakes

General characteristics
- Class & type: Package freighter
- Tonnage: 1,436.6 GRT; 1,230.15 NRT; 1,035 BOM
- Length: 236 feet (71.9 m) o/a; 227 feet (69.2 m) p/p
- Beam: 34 feet (10.4 m)
- Depth: 14 feet 2 inches (4.3 m)
- Installed power: Engine: 1 × 400 ihp (300 kW) low pressure double–acting fore–and–aft compound steam engine; Boilers: 1 × return–flue boiler (1867–1884); 2 × steel boilers (1884–1893)
- Propulsion: 1 × 11 feet (3.4 m) propeller
- Capacity: 1,300 long tons (1,321 t), or 46,000 bushels

SS Philadelphia was an American package freighter active on the Great Lakes between 1867 and 1893. She was built by shipwright David Bell in Buffalo, New York, for the J. C. & E. T. Evans Company of the same city. A product of a critical period of innovation in the region, Philadelphia was the second metal–hulled merchant ship built on the Great Lakes. In 1873, she joined the fleet of the Erie & Western Transportation Company of Erie, Pennsylvania, also known as the Anchor Line, a subsidiary of the Pennsylvania Railroad.

On the morning of 7 November 1893, Philadelphia was bound from Erie for Duluth, Minnesota, with a cargo of coal and various miscellaneous items. As she reached the mouth of Saginaw Bay, a thick bank of fog had settled over Lake Huron. At around 02:00, Philadelphia's crew spotted the downbound steel package freighter Albany in close in their immediate vicinity. Despite evasive action by both vessels, Philadelphia rammed Albany. Philadelphia picked up Albany's crew, towing her for around half an hour, before cutting her loose and allowing her to sink. Philadelphia ran on for roughly an hour, before sinking as well. A combined 24 crewmen were lost from both vessels, 16 of them from Philadelphia.

Her wreck, which rests in 105 to 125 feet (32.0 to 38.1 m) of water, is protected as part of the Thumb Area Bottomland Preserve.

== History ==
=== Background ===
In 1843, the gunship USS Michigan became the first iron-hulled vessel built on the Great Lakes upon her launching in Erie, Pennsylvania. Though Canadian merchants were importing iron vessels prefabricated in the United Kingdom by the mid-1840s, the first regionally produced iron-hulled merchant vessel, Merchant, was not built until 1862. Despite Merchant's clear success proving the potential of iron hulls, wooden ships remained preferable until the 1880s because of their lower cost and the abundance of high-quality timber and trained carpenters. Between the early 1870s and the mid-1880s, shipyards around the Great Lakes began to construct iron ships on a relatively large scale.

David Bell, a Scottish immigrant, founded the Bell & McNish engine works in 1845 in Buffalo, New York; the company eventually evolved into the Bell's Steam Engine Works. Bell started constructing ships under his own name in 1858, including Merchant. Philadelphia was the eighth ship built by his yard.

=== Service history ===
Philadelphia in Buffalo, c. 1872

=== Final voyage ===
==== Aftermath ====
The first lifeboat, containing the captains of both Albany and Philadelphia, as well as 21 crewmen, reached the shores of Pointe Aux Barques at roughly 08:00. They had attempted to remain with the second, larger lifeboat, containing 24 crewmen, but heavy fog eventually obscured it from their view.

The upturned missing lifeboat was discovered on the morning of 8 November by a member of the life saving service, 22 miles (35.4 km) from land. It had sustained significant damage on one end, indicating a collision with a larger object in rapid motion. The body of a crewman was discovered under the boat. Lifesavers, with the assistance of the steamer City of Concord, recovered 11 bodies. They were transported to Tawas City, Michigan, on 8 November. Several of the bodies sustained injuries such a crushed skull, broken limbs, and bruising. The damage to the lifeboat and the injuries to the bodies fueled suspicions the craft had been run down by a passing vessel. As the crew of the first lifeboat were certain the second lifeboat had made it a significant distance from the sinking Philadelphia, her still turning propeller could not have struck the diminutive craft. A total of 24 people from both vessels were killed; 8 from Albany, and 16 from Philadelphia.

Philadelphia's crew blamed Albany for the collision, alleging she had strayed off course; while Philadelphia maintained both her correct heading, and the appropriate speed for the meteorological conditions.

An investigation by Steamboat Inspection Service's regional inspectors in Port Huron, Michigan, determined heavy fog as the cause of the collision, absolving the officers of both vessels of any wrongdoing.

== Wreck ==
3D photogrammetry model of Philadelphia's wreck

Philadelphia's wreck was discovered by wreck hunter John Steele in 1973. The wreck rest in 105 to 125 feet (32.0 to 38.1 m) of water around 5.5 miles (8.9 km) northwest of Pointe Aux Barques, off Grindstone City, Michigan. The hull, which is mostly intact save for the collision damage at the bow, still contains the engine and boilers. Some of the cast iron stoves from her cargo are scattered on the bottom of the lake. The wreck is located within the boundaries of the Thumb Area Bottomland Preserve.

== Sources ==
- "25 Lost – Two Propellers Sink off Point Aux Barques". The Detroit News. 7 November 1893. p. 1 – via Newspapers.com.
- "An Error". Buffalo Courier-Express. 7 December 1867. p. 8 – via Newspapers.com.
- "Boat Albany at Fault". Grand Rapids Herald. 9 November 1893. p. 2 – via Newspapers.com.
- Bowlus, W. Bruce (2010). Iron Ore Transport on the Great Lakes: The Development of a Delivery System to Feed American Industry. Jefferson, North Carolina: McFarland & Company, Inc. ISBN 978-0-786433-26-1.
- Bugbee, Gordon P. (February 1962a). "Iron Merchant Ships: An Upper Lakes Centennial - Part One" (PDF). Telescope. 11 (2). Detroit: Great Lakes Maritime Institute: 24–27 – via Maritime History of the Great Lakes.
- Bugbee, Gordon P. (March 1962b). "Iron Merchant Ships: An Upper Lakes Cenntenial – Part Two" (PDF). Telescope. 11 (3). Detroit: Great Lakes Maritime Institute: 46–51 – via Maritime History of the Great Lakes.
- Colton, Tim (2016). "David Bell, Buffalo NY". Shipbuilding History.
- "Decision of the Steamboat Inspectors - Have Failed to Qualify". Detroit Free Press. 6 January 1894. p. 3 – via Newspapers.com.
- Kohl, Cris (2008). The Great Lakes Diving Guide (2nd ed.). West Chicago: Seawolf Communications. ISBN 978-0-9679-9769-8.
- "Launch of the New Iron Propeller". The Buffalo Daily Republic. 6 December 1867. p. 3 – via Newspapers.com.
- "Many Perished". Lansing State Journal. 9 November 1893. p. 2 – via Newspapers.com.
- Merryman, Ken (2022). "Shipwreck Philadelphia". Golden Valley, Minnesota: Great Lakes Shipwreck Preservation Society.
- "New Iron Propeller Launched". Buffalo Daily Dispatch and Evening Post. 6 December 1867. p. 2 – via Newspapers.com.
- "One is Alive". The Detroit News. 9 November 1893. p. 1 – via Newspapers.com.
- "One Man in Hiding". Grand Rapids Herald. 10 November 1893. p. 1 – via Newspapers.com.
- "Our Lake Fleet". Buffalo Courier-Express. 6 December 1867. p. 4 – via Newspapers.com.
- "Philadelphia". Bowling Green, Ohio: Bowling Green State University. Archived from the original on 11 November 2026 – via Historical Collections of the Great Lakes.
- "Philadelphia (1868, Package Freighter)". Alpena, Michigan: Alpena County George N. Fletcher Public Library.
- Stein, C. E. (1968). "A Flour Story" (PDF). Telescope. 17 (5). Detroit: Great Lakes Maritime Institute: 94–99 – via Maritime History of the Great Lakes.
- "Story of the Collision". The Times Herald. Port Huron, Michigan. 8 November 1893. p. 5 – via Newspapers.com.
- "The Iron Ship". Buffalo Post. 6 December 1867. p. 3 – via Newspapers.com.
- "The Iron Steamers, Philadelphia and Albany, Collide Early Tuesday Morning off Pte. Aux Barques". The Times. Harbor Beach, Michigan. 10 November 1893. p. 1 – via Newspapers.com.
- "Thirteen Lives Lost". The Times Herald. Port Huron, Michigan. 7 November 1893. p. 1 – via Newspapers.com.
- Thompson, Mark L. (1994). Queen of the Lakes. Detroit: Wayne State University Press. ISBN 978-0-814343-36-4.
- "Thumb Area Bottomland Preserve". St. Ignace, Michigan: Michigan Underwater Preserve Council.
