= SS Albany (1884) =

American package freighter (1884–1893)

Coordinates: 44°6′21.06″N 82°42′0.96″W

History

United States
- Name: Albany
- Operator: Western Transit Company
- Port of registry: Buffalo, New York
- Builder: Detroit Dry Dock Company
- Cost: $200,000 ($6.03 million in 2025)
- Yard number: 69
- Launched: 21 August 1884
- Maiden voyage: 23 September 1884
- Out of service: 7 November 1893
- Identification: US official number 106306
- Fate: Sank in a collision with the package freighter Philadelphia
- Notes: First steel freighter built on the Great Lakes

General characteristics
- Class & type: Package freighter
- Tonnage: 1,917.79 GRT; 1,677.80 NRT
- Length: 282 feet (86.0 m) o/a; 266 feet (81.1 m) p/p
- Beam: 39 feet (11.9 m)
- Depth: 17 feet 6 inches (5.3 m)
- Installed power: Engine: 1 × 650 ihp (480 kW) fore–and–aft compound steam engine; Boilers: 2 × 110 pounds per square inch (760 kPa) firebox boilers
- Propulsion: 1 × 12 feet 6 inches (3.8 m) propeller
- Speed: 12 miles per hour (10.4 kn)
- Capacity: 2,500 long tons (2,540 t), or 85,000 bushels

SS Albany was an American package freighter active on the Great Lakes between 1884 and 1893. She was built to the design of naval architect Frank E. Kirby by the Detroit Dry Dock Company in Wyandotte, Michigan, for the Western Transit Company of Buffalo, New York, to haul cargo between Buffalo and Chicago, Illinois. Built during a period of significant localised innovation, she was the first steel–hulled freighter built on the Great Lakes. She was damaged in a grounding in November 1887.

On 5 November 1893, Albany left Chicago for Buffalo with a cargo of corn, flour, and oats. By the time she neared Pointe Aux Barques, a thick fog had settled over Lake Huron. At around 02:00 (EST) on 7 November, Albany was rammed by the upbound package freighter Philadelphia. All of her crew boarded Philadelphia, which towed Albany for roughly half an hour, before being cut loose and sinking. Philadelphia ran on for roughly an hour, before sinking as well. Eight of Albany's crew were killed.

Her wreck, which rests in 132 to 149 feet (40.2 to 45.4 m) of water, is protected as part of the Thumb Area Bottomland Preserve.

== History ==
=== Background ===
In 1843, the gunship USS Michigan became the first iron-hulled vessel built on the Great Lakes upon her launching in Erie, Pennsylvania. Though Canadian merchants were importing iron vessels prefabricated in the United Kingdom by the mid-1840s, the first regionally produced iron-hulled merchant vessel, Merchant, was not built until 1862. Despite Merchant's clear success proving the potential of iron hulls, wooden ships remained preferable until the 1880s because of their lower cost and the abundance of high-quality timber and trained carpenters. Between the early 1870s and the mid-1880s, shipyards around the Great Lakes began to construct iron ships on a relatively large scale.

=== Design and construction ===
Albany in Detroit, in 1884

Albany (hull number 69) was built by the Detroit Dry Dock Company of Wyandotte, Michigan, to the design of naval architect Frank E. Kirby for the Western Transit Company of Buffalo, New York, exclusively to haul cargo between Buffalo and Chicago, Illinois. Her construction was supervised by F. A. Kirby, superintendent of the shipyard. Albany's construction coincided with a period of rapid technological innovation within the shipbuilding industry on the Great Lakes, being the first steel–hulled freighter built on them. Her hull was composed of mild steel plating, the most suitable type of steel available for shipbuilding at the time, which varied in thickness from 0.5 inches (1.3 cm) to 0.75 inches (1.9 cm). She cost roughly $200,000 ($6.03 million in 2025) to build. (Note: Johnston, Louis & Williamson, Samuel H. (2023). "What Was the U.S. GDP Then?". MeasuringWorth. United States Gross Domestic Product deflator figures follow the MeasuringWorth series.) Albany had an identical sister ship named Syracuse, launched in September 1884; she also bore a strong resemblance to the earlier iron package freighter Boston.

The hull of Albany had an overall length of 282 feet (86.0 metres), a length between perpendiculars of 266 feet (81.1 m), a beam of 39 feet (11.9 m), with a hold depth of 17 feet 6 inches (5.3 m). (Note: Some sources list her length between perpendiculars as 267 feet (81.4 m) or 265 feet (80.8 m). The depth of her hull was also listed as 13.9 feet (4.2 m) or 13.66 feet (4.2 m).) She measured 1,917.79 gross register tons and 1,677.80 net register tons. (Note: The Bowling Green State University lists her register tonnage as 1,917 gross, and 1,677 net.) Albany's hull contained six watertight bulkheads. Her working decks were wooden, with her main and promenade decks spaced 9 feet (2.7 m) apart. She had a capacity of 2,500 long tons (2,540 t), or 85,000 bushels. (Note: One source lists her capacity as 2,250 long tons (2,286 t) on a 14 feet (4.3 m) draught.)

She was powered by a 650 ihp (480 kW) fore–and–aft compound steam engine; the two cylinders of the engine were 28 inches (71.1 cm) and 48 inches (121.9 cm) in diameter, and had a stroke of 48 inches (121.9 cm). Steam was provided by two firebox boilers 9 feet (2.7 m) in diameter, 16 feet (4.9 m) in length, with a working pressure of 110-pound-per-square-inch (760 kPa). (Note: One source lists the length of her boiler as 17 feet (5.2 m), and working pressure as 100-pound-per-square-inch (690 kPa).) Her engine and boilers were manufactured by the Detroit Dry Dock Company. Her machinery was connected to a shaft 11.5 inches (29.2 cm) in diameter; driving a propeller 12 feet 6 inches (3.8 m) in diameter, with a 16-foot (4.9 m) pitch. Albany's machinery enabled her to reach an average speed of 12 miles per hour (10.4 kn).

The side–launching of Albany took place on 21 August 1884. She reached the water one minute and ten seconds after the ropes holding her were severed. She was towed to Detroit, Michigan, by the tug Chushing on 22 August, where she received her funnels and topmasts.

=== Service history ===
Albany's sea trials were initially scheduled for 17 September 1884. (Note: One source states 18 September 1884.) However, they were postponed due to poor weather. Her engine was operated at a limited capacity while moored instead. She began her trial trip at 14:00 on 18 September, after loading fuel in Detroit. She steamed north, briefly entering Lake St. Clair, turned around, and proceeded down the Detroit River to Fighting Island. Her engine operated at limited revolutions throughout.

Her owners' desire to procure 80,000 bushels of wheat for Albany's inaugural trip to Buffalo caused a spike in wheat prices on 19 September. Albany cleared Detroit for Buffalo at 09:00 on 23 September, laden with only the 73,000 bushels of wheat obtainable without causing delays. She arrived in Buffalo around 09:00 on 25 September, drawing 14 feet (4.3 m) of water. Frank E. Kirby and his draughtsmen travelled to Buffalo aboard Albany. She unloaded her cargo at the Bennett Elevator on 26 September, and loaded a cargo of merchandise bound for Chicago.

==== 1887 grounding ====
During a powerful snow storm on the night of 24 November 1887, Albany, while laden with animal feed, 4,000 barrels of flour, and grain, ran hard aground on a reef about 1.5 miles (2.4 km) off the southeastern end of Bois Blanc Island. (Note: One source lists her cargo as animal feed, beef, bran, flour, lard, and pork.) Her bow and stern came to rest in 11 feet (3.4 m) and 16 feet (4.9 m) of water respectively. Her crew was removed. Albany sustained bottom damage around her first compartment, with 15 feet (4.6 m) of water flooding her hold. Her seacocks were opened, allowing her to settle to the bottom.

The tugs Leviathan and Saugatuck, accompanied by several lighters began working to jettison Albany's cargo on 26 November. However, anticipating another storm, they allowed her to fill with water again, to prevent her hull from pounding against the rocks. Leviathan, along with the tugs Gladiator and Swain resumed work the following day. Upon an inspection of her bottom by the salvors, a large hole was discovered just aft of her collision bulkhead. They placed bedding over the hole to patch the leak. However, as Albany was removed from the reef, the bent steel plates returned to their original placement, aiding in the prevention of a further leak.

At around 22:00 on 27 November, the three tugs succeeded in refloating Albany. With five pumps aboard, she was towed to Duncan City, Michigan, where the remaining 10,000 long tons (10,160 t) of corn in her holds could be removed. Only 200 long tons (203 t) of the flour aboard could be salvaged. She left Cheboygan, Michigan, for Detroit on the morning of 1 December, with five pumps aboard, escorted by Leviathan and Swain. (Note: Sources disagree whether or not Albany proceeded to Detroit under her own power, or in tow of the tugs.)

Early on 4 December, Albany arrived in Detroit. She moored at the Lake Superior Transit Company's dock, where 20,000 bushels of wet corn was removed. She was placed in the Springwells Dry Dock to receive repairs. The loss to Albany's cargo, combined with the costs incurred in the salvage process amounted to $100,000 ($3.14 million in 2025).

=== Final voyage ===
Albany left Chicago for Buffalo on the night of 5 November 1893 under the command of Captain Angus J. McDonald, laden with 250 barrels of flour, 17,000 bushels of corn, and 75,000 bushels of oats. As she crossed the mouth of Saginaw Bay, thick fog banks obscured the view from Albany's pilothouse. Consequently, she blew fog signals. On the morning of 7 November around 02:00 (EST), Albany's crew heard the vessel of a nearby vessel. Shortly thereafter, McDonald sighted the iron package freighter Philadelphia, and turned his vessel to port, an action mirrored by Philadelphia. About a minute after the two vessels sighted each other, Philadelphia rammed Albany on her port side, forward of her no. 2 gangway, abaft of the cabin doors. Philadelphia's bow penetrated roughly a third of Albany's width. After Philadelphia reversed out of the gash, she came alongside Albany, allowing the latter's crew to board. As her collision bulkhead appeared to be holding, Philadelphia began towing Albany towards the shore. However, after around 30 to 45 minutes, Philadelphia's bulkhead began to give way, and Albany continued to sink. On the orders of Captain A. E. Huff of Philadelphia, the lone connecting the two vessels was severed, allowing Albany to sink. People aboard Philadelphia reported seeing Albany sink stern first, her bow rising out of the water, after which she rolled over to starboard and sank.

Philadelphia continued her journey towards the shore for about an hour, until the influx of water into her hull necessitated the launching of her lifeboats. As they were being lowered, the bulkhead gave way. Her engines were left running full steam ahead when the crew disembarked. She also sank.

==== Aftermath ====
The first lifeboat, containing the captains of both Albany and Philadelphia, as well as 21 crewmen, reached the shores of Pointe Aux Barques at roughly 08:00. They had attempted to remain with the second, larger lifeboat, containing 24 crewmen, but heavy fog eventually obscured it from their view.

The upturned missing lifeboat was discovered on the morning of 8 November by a member of the life saving service, 22 miles (35.4 km) from land. It had sustained significant damage on one end, indicating a collision with a larger object in rapid motion. The body of a crewman was discovered under the boat. Lifesavers, with the assistance of the steamer City of Concord, recovered 11 bodies. They were transported to Tawas City, Michigan, on 8 November. Several of the bodies sustained injuries such a crushed skull, broken limbs, and bruising. The damage to the lifeboat and the injuries to the bodies fueled suspicions the craft had been run down by a passing vessel. As the crew of the first lifeboat were certain the second lifeboat had made it a significant distance from the sinking Philadelphia, her still turning propeller could not have struck the diminutive craft. A total of 24 people from both vessels were killed; 8 from Albany, and 16 from Philadelphia.

Philadelphia's crew blamed Albany for the collision, alleging she had strayed off course; while Philadelphia maintained both her correct heading, and the appropriate speed for the meteorological conditions.

An investigation by Steamboat Inspection Service's regional inspectors in Port Huron, Michigan, determined heavy fog as the cause of the collision, absolving the officers of both vessels of any wrongdoing.

== Wreck ==
3D photogrammetry model of Albany's wreck

Albany's wreck rests in 132 to 149 feet (40.2 to 45.4 m) around 8 miles (13 km) northeast of Pointe Aux Barques, off Grindstone City, Michigan, about 2.5 miles (4.0 km) northeast of Philadelphia's wreck. The wreck is significantly broken and disarticulated amidships, while her bow and stern remain partially intact. While her cabins are not present, the engine, boilers, and other miscellaneous steam machinery remain at the site. The wreck is located within the boundaries of the Thumb Area Bottomland Preserve.

== Sources ==
- "25 Lost – Two Propellers Sink off Point Aux Barques". The Detroit News. 7 November 1893. p. 1 – via Newspapers.com.
- "A Bad Lookout for the Albany". Detroit Free Press. 28 November 1887. p. 1 – via Newspapers.com.
- "Albany". Bowling Green, Ohio: Bowling Green State University. Archived from the original on 26 July 2024 – via Historical Collections of the Great Lakes.
- "Albany (1884, Package Freighter)". Alpena, Michigan: Alpena County George N. Fletcher Public Library.
- "Arrival of the Albany". The Detroit News. 5 December 1887. p. 4 – via Newspapers.com.
- "Boat Albany at Fault". Grand Rapids Herald. 9 November 1893. p. 2 – via Newspapers.com.
- Bowlus, W. Bruce (2010). Iron Ore Transport on the Great Lakes: The Development of a Delivery System to Feed American Industry. Jefferson, North Carolina: McFarland & Company, Inc. ISBN 978-0-786433-26-1.
- Bugbee, Gordon P. (February 1962a). "Iron Merchant Ships: An Upper Lakes Centennial - Part One" (PDF). Telescope. 11 (2). Detroit: Great Lakes Maritime Institute: 24–27 – via Maritime History of the Great Lakes.
- Bugbee, Gordon P. (March 1962b). "Iron Merchant Ships: An Upper Lakes Cenntenial – Part Two" (PDF). Telescope. 11 (3). Detroit: Great Lakes Maritime Institute: 46–51 – via Maritime History of the Great Lakes.
- "Commercial". Detroit Free Press. 20 September 1884. p. 7 – via Newspapers.com.
- "Decision of the Steamboat Inspectors - Have Failed to Qualify". Detroit Free Press. 6 January 1894. p. 3 – via Newspapers.com.
- Kohl, Cris (2008). The Great Lakes Diving Guide (2nd ed.). West Chicago: Seawolf Communications. ISBN 978-0-9679-9769-8.
- "Launch of the Steamship Albany". Detroit Free Press. 22 August 1884. p. 7 – via Newspapers.com.
- "Made Her Trial Trip". Detroit Free Press. 19 September 1884. p. 7 – via Newspapers.com.
- "Many Perished". Lansing State Journal. 9 November 1893. p. 2 – via Newspapers.com.
- "Marine Intelligence". The Bay City Times. Bay City, Michigan. 30 November 1887. p. 2 – via Newspapers.com.
- "Marine Notes". The Detroit News. 18 September 1884. p. 4 – via Newspapers.com.
- Merryman, Ken (2023). "Shipwreck Albany". Golden Valley, Minnesota: Great Lakes Shipwreck Preservation Society.
- "Notes". Detroit Free Press. 23 August 1884. p. 7 – via Newspapers.com.
- "Notes". Detroit Free Press. 31 August 1884. p. 15 – via Newspapers.com.
- "Notes". Detroit Free Press. 16 September 1884. p. 15 – via Newspapers.com.
- "One is Alive". The Detroit News. 9 November 1893. p. 1 – via Newspapers.com.
- "One Man in Hiding". Grand Rapids Herald. 10 November 1893. p. 1 – via Newspapers.com.
- "Several Steamers Ashore". The Saginaw News. Saginaw, Michigan. 25 November 1887. p. 2 – via Newspapers.com.
- "Several Vessels Ashore". The Detroit News. 25 November 1887. p. 1 – via Newspapers.com.
- Stein, C. E. (1968). "A Flour Story" (PDF). Telescope. 17 (5). Detroit: Great Lakes Maritime Institute: 94–99 – via Maritime History of the Great Lakes.
- "Story of the Collision". The Times Herald. Port Huron, Michigan. 8 November 1893. p. 5 – via Newspapers.com.
- "The Albany". Detroit Free Press. 18 September 1884. p. 7 – via Newspapers.com.
- "The Albany Afloat". The Detroit News. 22 August 1884. p. 4 – via Newspapers.com.
- "The Albany and Montgomery Proceed on Their Way". Detroit Free Press. 2 December 1887. p. 7 – via Newspapers.com.
- "The Albany at Buffalo". Detroit Free Press. 26 September 1884. p. 7 – via Newspapers.com.
- "The Albany Arrives". Detroit Free Press. 5 December 1887. p. 5 – via Newspapers.com.
- "The Albany is in Bad Shape". Detroit Free Press. 28 November 1887. p. 7 – via Newspapers.com.
- "The Albany Released – Work on the Montgomery". Detroit Free Press. 29 November 1887. p. 7 – via Newspapers.com.
- "The Albany Saved". Lansing State Journal. 28 November 1887. p. 1 – via Newspapers.com.
- "The Albany's Condition". The Detroit News. 27 November 1887. p. 1 – via Newspapers.com.
- "The Iron Steamers, Philadelphia and Albany, Collide Early Tuesday Morning off Pte. Aux Barques". The Times. Harbor Beach, Michigan. 10 November 1893. p. 1 – via Newspapers.com.
- "The Markets". Detroit Free Press. 21 September 1884. p. 13 – via Newspapers.com.
- "The Syracuse Launched". Detroit Free Press. 29 September 1884. p. 15 – via Newspapers.com.
- "Thirteen Lives Lost". The Times Herald. Port Huron, Michigan. 7 November 1893. p. 1 – via Newspapers.com.
- Thompson, Mark L. (1994). Queen of the Lakes. Detroit: Wayne State University Press. ISBN 978-0-814343-36-4.
- "Thumb Area Bottomland Preserve". St. Ignace, Michigan: Michigan Underwater Preserve Council.
- "Vessel Movements". Detroit Free Press. 24 September 1884. p. 7 – via Newspapers.com.
