= Lapeer Community Schools =

School district in Michigan

Address
- 250 2nd St. Lapeer, Lapeer County, Michigan, 48446; United States

District information
- Grades: Pre-Kindergarten-12
- Superintendent: Matt Wandrie
- Schools: 8
- Budget: $66,449,000 2022-2023 expenditures
- NCES District ID: 2621180

Students and staff
- Students: 4,089 (2024-2025)
- Teachers: 212.68 FTE (2024-2025)
- Staff: 623.43 FTE (2024-2025)
- Student–teacher ratio: 19.43 (2024-2025)

Other information
- Website: www.lapeerschools.org

Lapeer Community Schools is a public school district in Lapeer County, Michigan. It serves Lapeer, Metamora, Lapeer Township, Mayfield Township and parts of the following townships: Arcadia, Attica, Deerfield, Elba, Hadley, Oregon, and Metamora.

== History ==
Lapeer Academy was the first school in Lapeer County, though it was not affiliated with the school district, and it was housed in an old courthouse on the corner of Main and Genesee Streets. It was established in 1859 for high school students, and it became a union school in a public school district at some point prior to 1873, when a dedicated high school building was built.

The next high school was built in 1923, on the northwest corner of Main and Genesee Streets. It was replaced by a new high school in 1961, when it became a junior high school. It was used as the district administration building between 1995 and 2008, and was demolished in 2021.

In 1961, a new high school was built at 170 Millville Road. In January 1976, Lapeer East High School opened, and the existing high school became West High School. Lapeer's two high schools consolidated in fall 2014 in the East building. The West building became the Center for Innovation, an alternative high school.

Zemmer Junior High, now called Zemmer 8-9 Campus, was built in 1969 and underwent extensive renovations in 2010.

Due to school renovation projects, some grades will be assigned to different buildings during the 2025-2026 school year.

== Schools ==
Schools in Lapeer Community Schools district
School	Address	Notes
Lapeer High School	933 South Saginaw Street, Lapeer	Grades 10-12. Built 1975
Zemmer 8-9 Campus	1920 Oregon Road, Lapeer	Grades 8-9
Rolland-Warner 6-7 Campus	3145 W. Genesee Street, Lapeer	Grades 6-7
Center for Innovation	170 Millville Road, Lapeer	Houses an alternative high school and vocational training. Built 1961.
Lynch Elementary	2035 Roods Lake Road, Lapeer	Grades K-5
Murphy Elementary	1100 Pratt Road, Metamora	Grades K-5
Schickler Elementary	2020 W. Oregon Rd., Lapeer	Grades K-5
Turrill Elementary	785 South Elm Street, Lapeer	Grades K-5
Kids & Company Preschool & Childcare	3145 W. Genesee Street, Lapeer	Preschool and childcare services housed at the Rolland-Warner Campus
