= Metamora Crossroads Historic District =

Historic district in Michigan, United States

- U.S. National Register of Historic Places
- U.S. Historic district
- Michigan State Historic Site
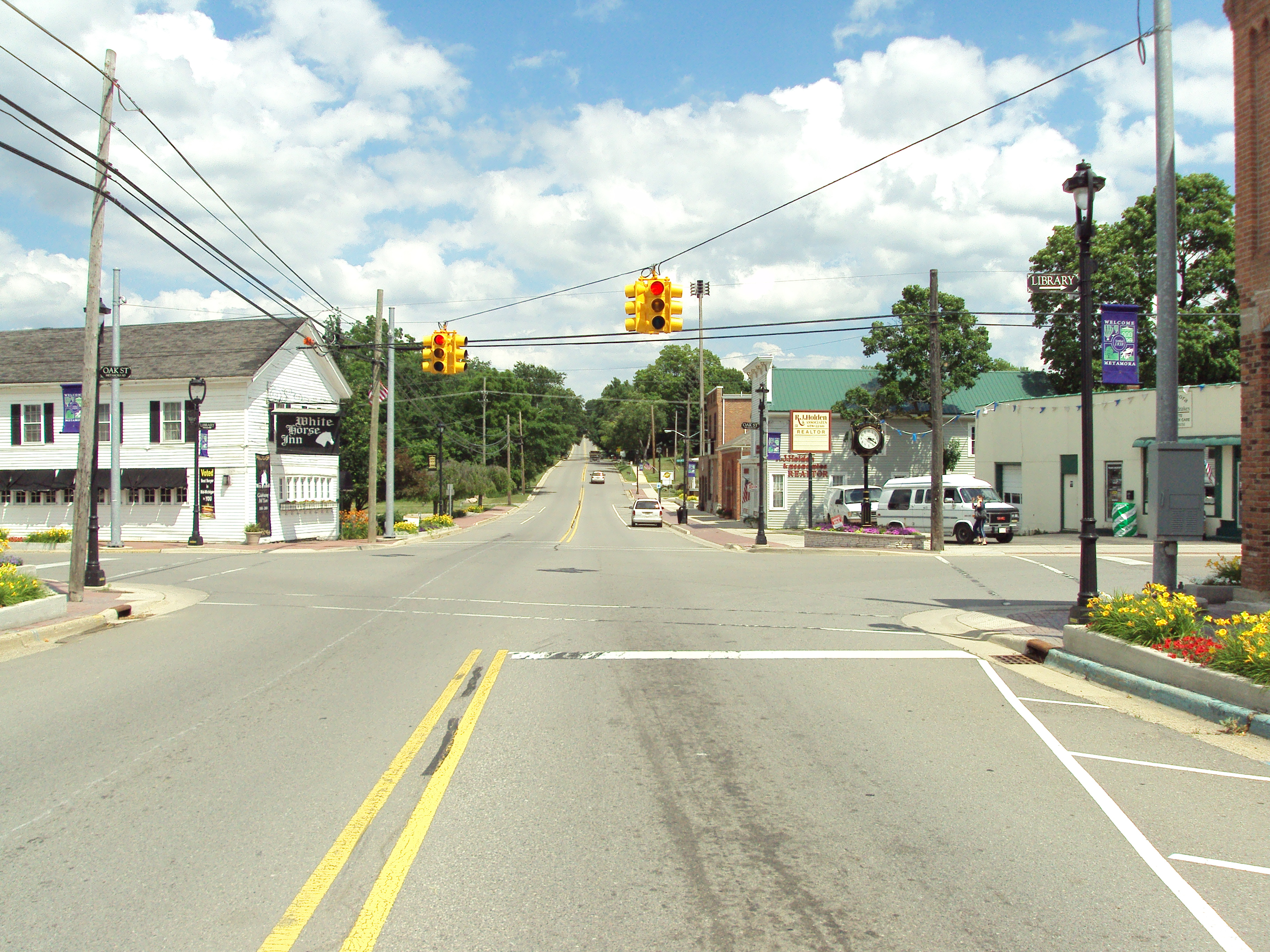

- Location within Michigan Location within the United States
- Interactive map
- Location: Intersection of Oak and High Street; Metamora, Michigan
- Coordinates: 42°56′30″N 83°17′20″W
- Area: 3.5 acres (1.4 ha)
- Built: 1850–1910
- Architectural style: Mix of Greek Revival, Gothic Revival, and Italianate
- NRHP reference No.: 84001790

Significant dates
- Added to NRHP: July 19, 1984
- Designated MSHS: July 19, 1984

The Metamora Crossroads Historic District is a historic district centered at the intersection of Oak and High Street in the small village of Metamora in Metamora Township in Lapeer County, Michigan. It was designated as a Michigan State Historic Site and also added to the National Register of Historic Places on July 19, 1984.

== Description ==
The historic district comprises 3.5 acres (1.4 hectares) and fifteen buildings, fourteen of which contribute to the historic character of the district. These structures consist of various functions and architecture, including Greek Revival, Gothic Revival, and Italianate architecture. The 15 buildings include ten commercial structures, four houses, and a church. Most of the buildings were built between 1850 and 1910, and several of them still retain their original purpose. The White Horse Inn, located at 1 East High Street, is promoted as Michigan's oldest continually running restaurant since first opening in 1850.

The district includes:

- Ammerman Building / Hoard House (now the White Horse Inn): A Greek Revival style village store built in 1850 by Daniel Ammerman.
- House: Two-story Greek Revival house built about 1850.
- Barrows Building: A wood-framed building covered in clapboard, built in about 1866 by Eber Barrows.
- Wilder Brothers building: A two-story wood-framed building covered in clapboard, built in about 1870 by the Wilder brothers.
- House: Two-story Italianate house built about 1870.
- Pilgrim Congregational Church: A Gothic-style church built in 1878.
- Stone Building: A two-story Italianate commercial building built in 1879 by Dr. David Stone.
- Metamora Township Hall and Opera House: A single-story red-brick Romanesque Revival structure built in 1888.
- Bank Building: Single-story red-brick building constructed in about 1890.
- Henderson Building: Single-story red-brick building with Queen Anne and Italianate elements, constructed in about 1890.
- Masonic Lodge: A two-story red-brick building constructed in 1907 by Marion Barnes as a combination store and Masonic Temple.
- Commercial Building: A single-story commercial building built in 1911.
- Pilgrim Congregational Church parsonage: Two-story wood-framed parsonage built about 1930.
- Walker House: A 1 1/2-story post-World War II house

== History ==
"Barrow's Corners," as Metamora was originally known, was first settled in 1839 by Eber Barrows. He constructed a log way station at this site in 1843 to shelter travelers heading north. In 1848, Territorial Road was opened through the settlement, and soon a number of competing hotels were opened in the area. To keep pace, Barrow modernized his way station and renamed it the Northern Exchange Hotel. In 1850, Daniel Ammerman built the first store in Barrow's Corners. The building was eventually enlarged into Lorenzo Hoard's House, another establishment for travelers. Around this time, agriculture became more important in the area, as farmers began raising sheep and apples. Metamora became the center of the surrounding agricultural community, with a blacksmith, wagon shop, and soon two doctors.

A number of commercial buildings were constructed by Eber Barrows and the Wilder Brothers in the late 1860s. In 1872, the Detroit and Bay City Railway constructed a line through the village, and Metamora became a hub for the transport of local goods. Brick commercial buildings gradually replaced earlier frame ones, and new churches and schools were constructed. In 1888 the Town Hall and Opera House was built, and a few more structures were built by 1910. As the automobile rose in the 1910s, Metamora began to lose residents to Flint and Pontiac. By the 1920s, new owners in the rural area were breeding horses and running hunt clubs. The village shops continued to provide convenient shopping to residents, and so remained in use. Development of this core area ceased prior to World War I, preserving the early architecture.
