= Elba, Michigan =

Elba, Michigan is the name of the following places in the U.S. state of Michigan:

- Elba Island (Michigan), an island in the Detroit River
- Elba Township, Gratiot County, Michigan
  - Elba, Gratiot County, Michigan, a historic locale
- Elba Township, Lapeer County, Michigan
  - Elba, Lapeer County, Michigan, an unincorporated community
- Elba, Washtenaw County, Michigan, a historic locale
