= Alvin N. Hart =

American politician

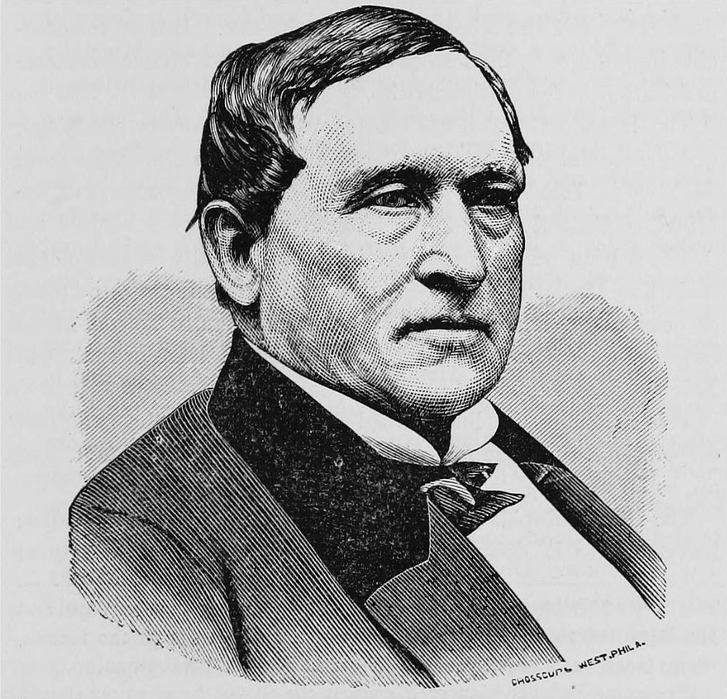

Member of the Michigan House of Representatives from the Lapeer County district
- In office November 2, 1835 – January 1, 1837

Member of the Michigan Senate from the 6th district
- In office January 1, 1844 – January 4, 1846
- In office January 3, 1848 – January 31, 1851

Member of the Michigan House of Representatives from the Ingham County, 1st district
- In office January 4, 1871 – December 31, 1872

Personal details
- Born: February 11, 1804 Cornwall, Connecticut
- Died: August 22, 1874 (aged 70) Lansing, Michigan
- Party: Democratic

Alvin Nelson Hart (February 11, 1804 – August 22, 1874) was an American jurist and politician who served multiple terms in the Michigan Senate and Michigan House of Representatives in the state's early years, and founded the town of Lapeer, Michigan.

== Biography ==
Alvin Hart was born in Cornwall, Connecticut, on February 11, 1804, the youngest son of Revolutionary War veteran Captain Elias Hart and Philomela Burnham. He lived on the family farm until the age of fifteen and was educated in an academy in Sharon, Connecticut, and then attended Amherst College, but did not graduate.

Hart married Charlotte F. Ball in Utica, New York, on July 8, 1828. He lived in Utica for three years and then moved to Michigan. He cut his way through 14 miles (23 km) of wilderness, to the site of present-day Lapeer, Michigan. He built the first log cabin in the area and moved into it on November 11, 1831. His older brother Oliver followed him soon after.

He platted the town of Lapeer, and was appointed sheriff of Lapeer County in 1832. He was a member of the state's constitutional convention in 1835 and that same year was elected as a Democrat to the Michigan House of Representatives. He was elected a supervisor of Lapeer Township in 1842, and served in the position for eleven years. He was elected to the Michigan Senate in 1843, and in 1846, he was elected to a four-year term as a four-year term chief judge of the Lapeer County court. He was elected again to the state senate in 1847 to fill the seat of the deceased Elijah B. Witherbee, and re-elected to a full term in 1848.

Hart founded Lapeer's first newspaper, the Plain Dealer, in 1839. Between 1845 and 1846, Hart invested $10,000 (equivalent to $358,333 in 2025) in building the Lapeer County Courthouse, to compete with another courthouse built by a Whig rival, Enoch J. White. He first offered to lease it to the county for $1 a year, but after the state senate, of which he was a member, voted to allow governments to levy taxes to pay for government buildings, he decided to sell it instead. After voters rejected his offer in 1851, Hart accepted $3,500 for it in 1853. The courthouse is the state's oldest still in use in a county seat.

In 1860, he moved to Lansing, Michigan, where he was a merchant and served as an alderman. He also had interests in real estate, milling, and railroads. He was elected to another term as a representative in 1871.

After a period of poor health, he contracted typhoid pneumonia and died a week later at his home in Lansing, on August 22, 1874. His body was taken from Lansing to Lapeer for his funeral and burial in a special railroad car, accompanied by the mayor and city council of Lansing. At his death, his estate was worth half a million dollars (equivalent to $14,227,941 in 2025).

=== Family ===
Hart and his wife Charlotte had five children: Danforth A., B. E., Rodney G., Arthur N., and Mrs. Bell Hamilton. Charlotte Hart died in August 1850.
