= General Squier Memorial Park =

- Dryden Community Country Club–General Squier Historic Park Complex
- U.S. National Register of Historic Places
- U.S. Historic district
- Michigan State Historic Site
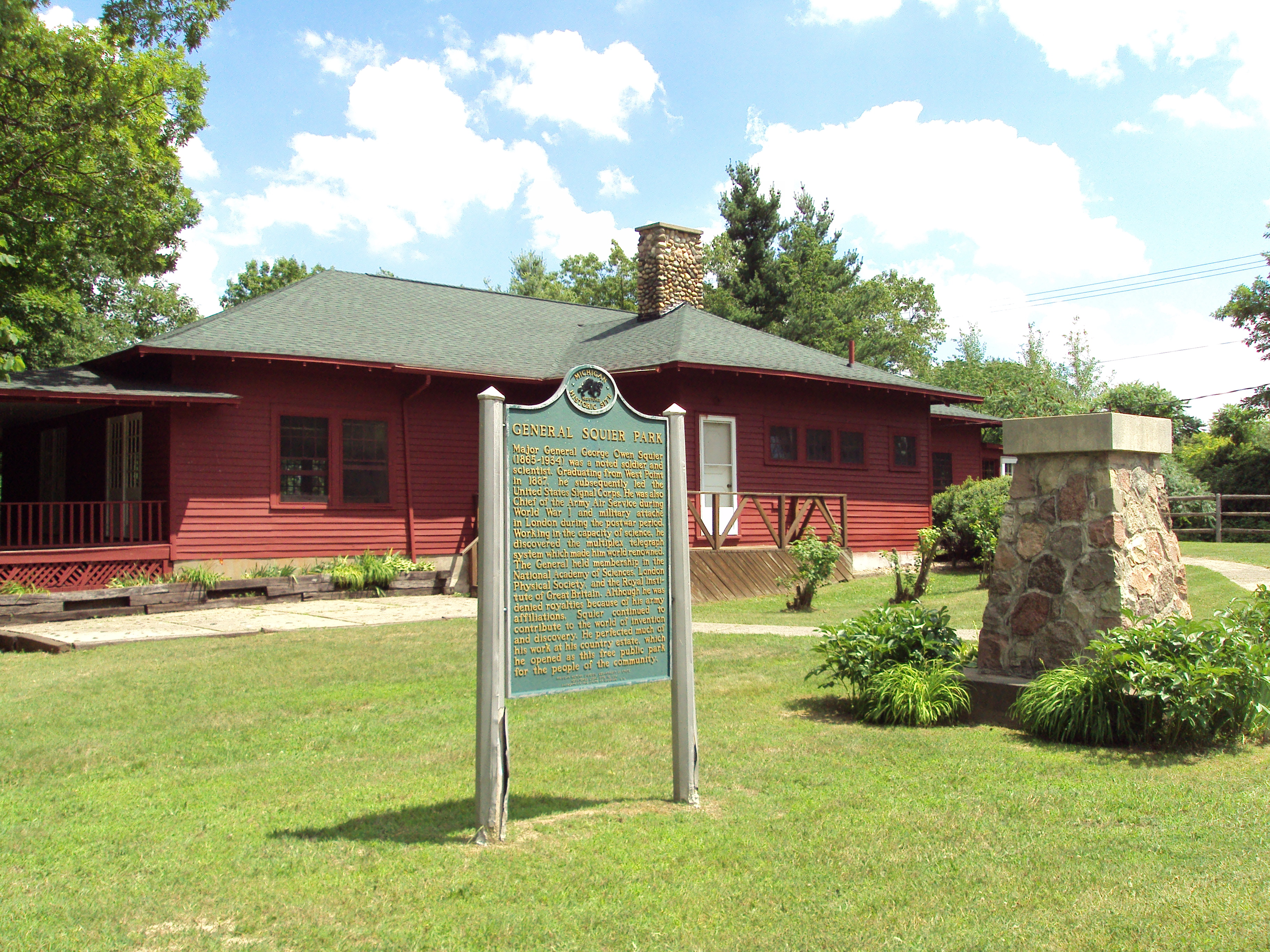

- Location within Michigan Location within the United States
- Interactive map
- Location: 4725 South Mill Road; Dryden Township, Michigan
- Coordinates: 42°55′33″N 83°07′27″W
- Area: 80 acres (32 ha)
- Built: 1870–1920
- NRHP reference No.: 86001220

Significant dates
- Added to NRHP: June 5, 1986
- Designated MSHS: June 6, 1977

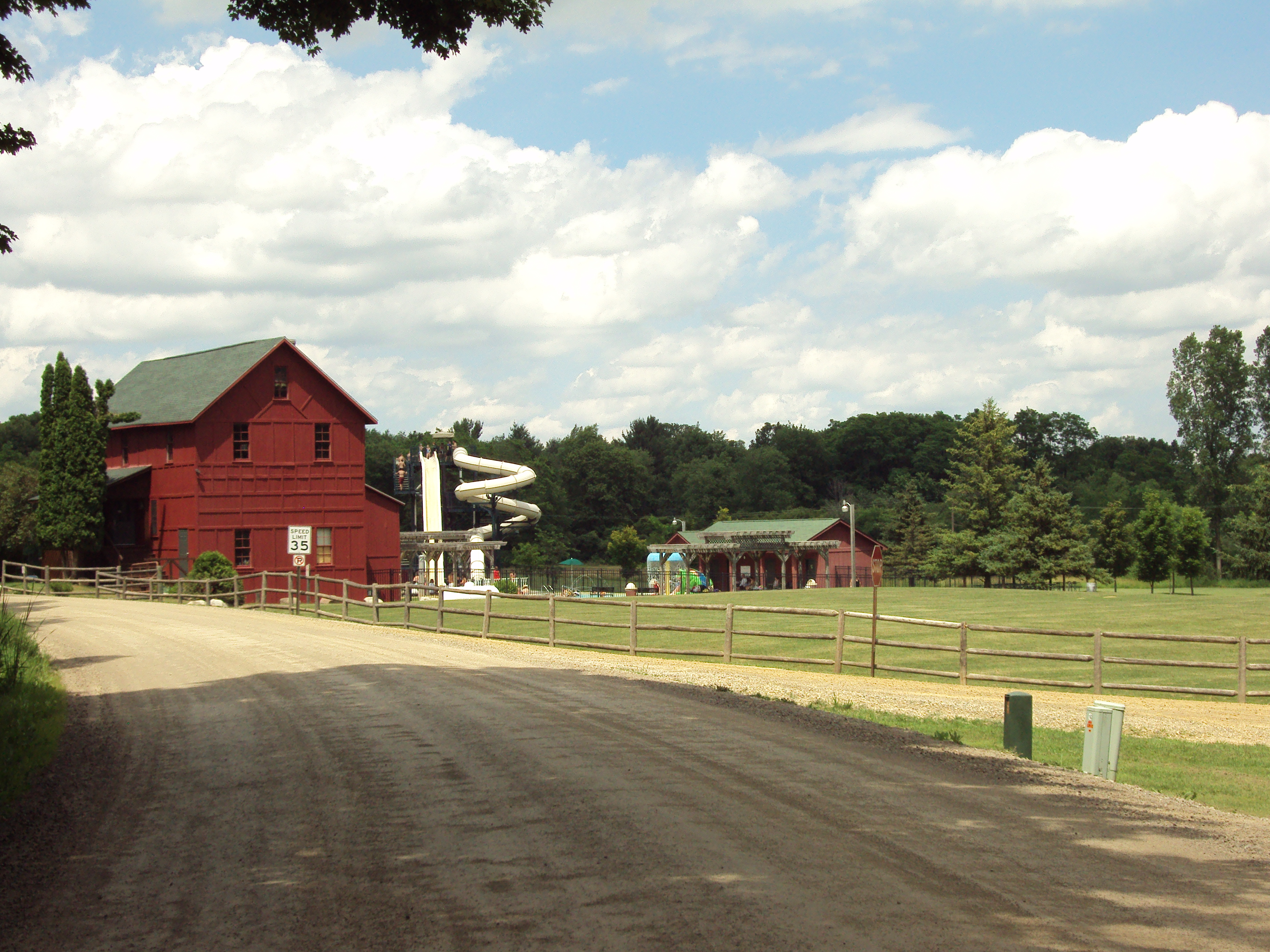
The mill and waterpark

The General Squier Memorial Park is a park located at 4725 South Mill Road in Dryden Township in southeastern Lapeer County, Michigan. It was designated as a Michigan Historic Site on June 6, 1977 and later added to the National Register of Historic Places on June 5, 1986, as the Dryden Community Country Club–General Squier Historic Park Complex. The site is also known locally as the General George Squier Club or General Squier County Park.

== History ==
In 1840, the Maynard Brothers built the first flouring mill in the township near this site. The mill was extensively used until 1870, when it burned. In 1871, they rebuilt the mill at this site. By the turn of the century, the mill had begun deteriorating. However, in 1917, Dryden native Major General George Owen Squier purchased the mill and a surrounding tract of 200 acres. Squier had plans to develop the property into a summer home and into a public park - what he referred to as a free "Country Club for Country People". Squier refurbished the mill and built Forest Hall and a cottage in 1917, and added a two-story wooden lookout tower and tea house in 1920.

Squier opened his Dryden Community Country Club in 1918, with no charge for admission. He built his own cottage on the site in 1920, and although he maintained homes in Washington DC and St Petersburg Florida, he returned to Dryden each summer. Over the years, he added other recreational equipment to the park. Squier died in 1934, and his sister, Mary Squier Park, deeded the property to Lapeer County. The property was renamed in Squier's honor and continues to this day as a free recreational facility, which now includes a waterpark situated next to the old mill.

== Description ==
The oldest structure on the 80 acre (33 hectare) site is a three-story timber mill dating to 1871. Squier restored the mill for use as a facility for family reunions, educational and club meetings, and social gatherings. Also on the site is a cottage, originally built in 1917, which is a single story, wood-framed and clapboard-sheathed bungalow with a low-pitched gable roof and wraparound porch. Originally a caretaker's cottage, the building was moved to its present site in 1931 after Squier's cottage burned. Also built in 1917 was Forest Hall, a wood-framed and clapboard-sheathed one-story building measuring 100 feet in by 60 feet. Inside is a kitchen, bathroom, and low stage. Squier constructed this building as the main facility for meetings, dances, and banquets. Also on the grounds are a 1917 pavilion and a two-story wooden lookout tower and tea house built in 1920.
