= Metamora Township, Michigan =

- Civil township
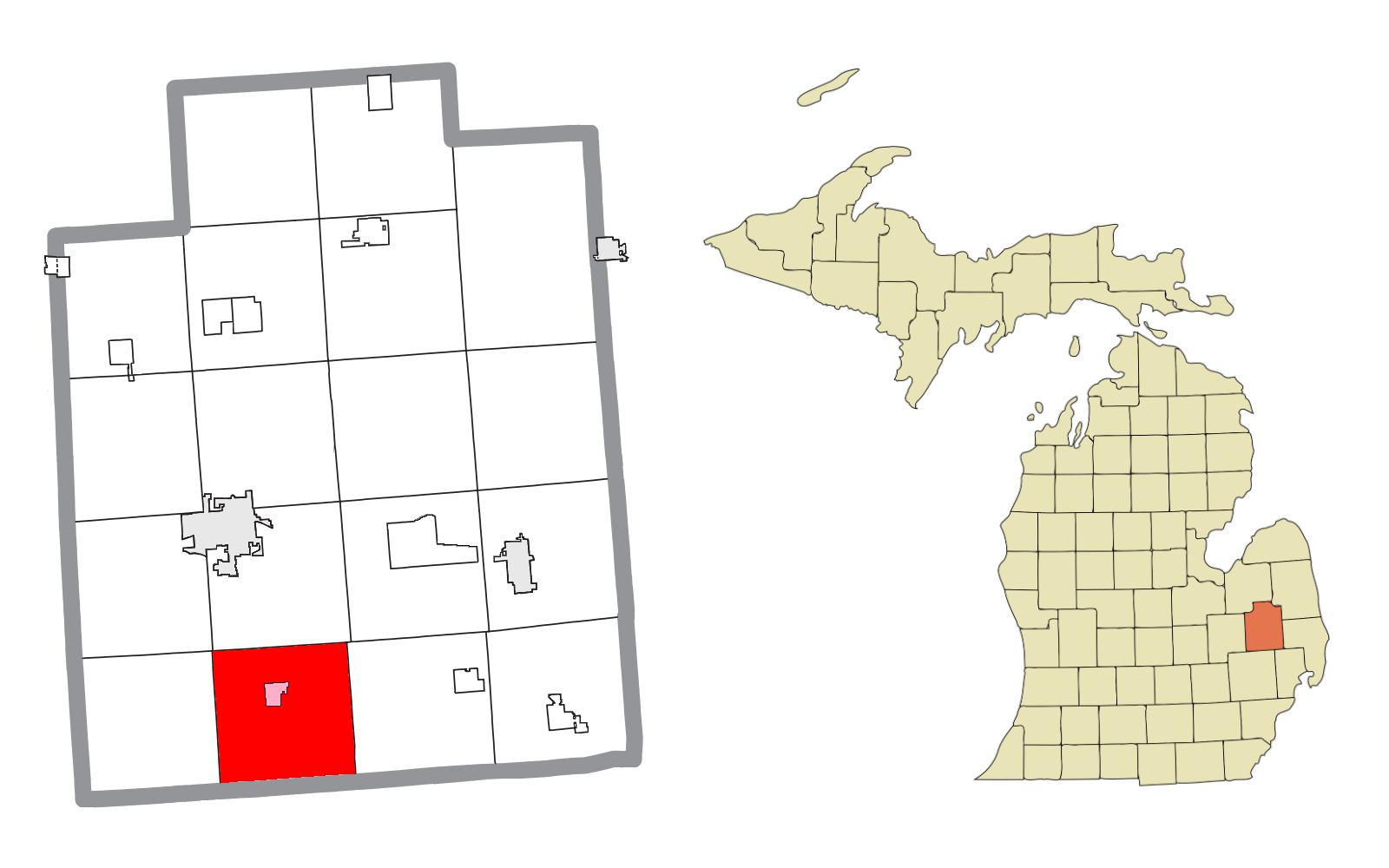
- Location within Lapeer County (red) and the administered village of Metamora (pink)

- Location within the state of Michigan Location within the United States
- Coordinates: 42°55′36″N 83°16′23″W
- Country: United States
- State: Michigan
- County: Lapeer
- Established: 2 April 1838

Area
  - Total: 35.3 sq mi (91.5 km^{2})
  - Land: 34.7 sq mi (90.0 km^{2})
  - Water: 0.54 sq mi (1.4 km^{2})
- Elevation: 1,063 ft (324 m)

Population (2020)
  - Total: 4,368
  - Density: 126/sq mi (48.5/km^{2})
- Time zone: UTC-5 (Eastern (EST))
  - Summer (DST): UTC-4 (EDT)
- ZIP code: 48455 (Metamora), 48371 (Oxford)
- Area code: 810
- FIPS code: 26-53360
- GNIS feature ID: 1626730
- Website: metamoratownship.com

Metamora Township is a civil township of Lapeer County in the U.S. state of Michigan. The population was 4,368 at the 2020 Census.

== History ==
Metamora Township was formed from the eastern half of Hadley Township on 2 April 1838. The name of the township was based on the character Metamora in the very popular 1829 play Metamora; or, The Last of the Wampanoags, which had a stage run over 60 years. This play inspired four new Midwestern towns to adopt the name Metamora — Metamora, Ohio in the 1830s, Metamora Township, Michigan in 1838 after the 1836-37 Toledo War caused the removal of Metamora from Michigan Territory to Ohio, Metamora, Indiana also in 1838, and Metamora, Illinois in 1845.

== Communities ==
- The village of Metamora is located within the township, and the Metamora post office, with ZIP code 48455, also serves most of the township.
- Farmers Creek is an unincorporated community at 42°57′46″N 83°20′24″W on the boundary between Metamora Township on the east and Hadley Township to the west. It was named for the nearby stream. John L. Morse purchased land here in 1833 and settled in 1834. John Look and family also settled here in 1834. Morse became the first postmaster on January 3, 1836, and the office operated until September 30, 1903.
- Thornville is an unincorporated community at 42°56′33″N 83°13′26″W on the boundary between Metamora Township on the west and Dryden Township on the east. It was given a post office with the name "Amboy" on March 21, 1837, with Joseph S. Gibbins as the first postmaster. Benjamin Thorne, who came here from Dutchess County, New York in 1839, became the third postmaster on December 3, 1845. On July 14, 1854, the settlement and post office were renamed Thornville after him. The post office operated until June 30, 1905.
- The village of Oxford is to the south in Oakland County, and the Oxford post office, with ZIP code 48371, also serves a portion of southern Metamora Township.

== Geography ==
According to the United States Census Bureau, the township has a total area of 35.3 square miles (91 km^{2}), of which 34.8 square miles (90 km^{2}) is land and 0.6 square miles (1.6 km^{2}) (1.59%) is water.

== Demographics ==
As of the census of 2000, there were 4,184 people, 1,533 households, and 1,214 families residing in the township. The population density was 120.4 inhabitants per square mile (46.5/km^{2}). There were 1,634 housing units at an average density of 47.0 per square mile (18.1/km^{2}). The racial makeup of the township was 97.28% White, 0.17% African American, 0.33% Native American, 0.43% Asian, 0.31% from other races, and 1.48% from two or more races. Hispanic or Latino of any race were 1.20% of the population.

There were 1,533 households, out of which 34.6% had children under the age of 18 living with them, 68.6% were married couples living together, 7.4% had a female householder with no husband present, and 20.8% were non-families. 16.9% of all households were made up of individuals, and 4.2% had someone living alone who was 65 years of age or older. The average household size was 2.72 and the average family size was 3.06.

In the township the population was spread out, with 25.9% under the age of 18, 6.8% from 18 to 24, 29.9% from 25 to 44, 27.8% from 45 to 64, and 9.6% who were 65 years of age or older. The median age was 39 years. For every 100 females, there were 99.8 males. For every 100 females age 18 and over, there were 98.9 males.

The median income for a household in the township was $61,250, and the median income for a family was $67,425. Males had a median income of $53,589 versus $34,107 for females. The per capita income for the township was $29,255. About 4.7% of families and 5.4% of the population were below the poverty line, including 4.2% of those under age 18 and 4.0% of those age 65 or over.

== Education ==
Most of the township is in Lapeer Community Schools. Other portions are in Dryden Community Schools, and Oxford Community Schools.

Respective zoned high schools are Lapeer High School, Dryden Junior/Senior High School, and Oxford High School.
