= Arcadia Township, Lapeer County, Michigan =

Arcadia Township, Michigan
- Civil township
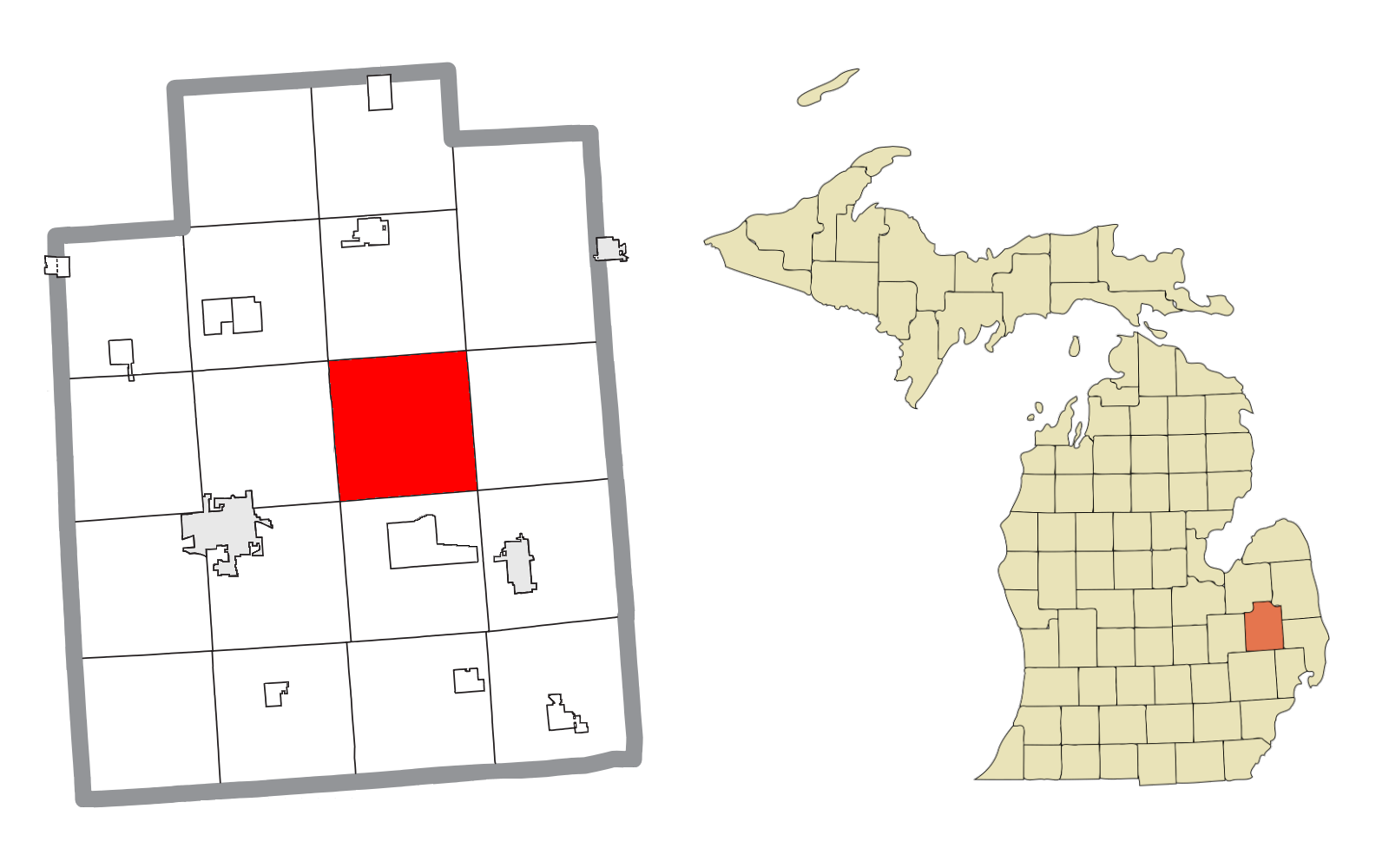
- Location within Lapeer County

- Location within the state of Michigan Location within the United States
- Coordinates: 43°06′48″N 83°10′08″W
- Country: United States
- State: Michigan
- County: Lapeer

Area
  - Total: 36.2 sq mi (93.7 km^{2})
  - Land: 35.3 sq mi (91.5 km^{2})
  - Water: 0.85 sq mi (2.2 km^{2})
- Elevation: 909 ft (277 m)

Population (2020)
  - Total: 3,148
  - Density: 89.1/sq mi (34.4/km^{2})
- Time zone: UTC-5 (Eastern (EST))
  - Summer (DST): UTC-4 (EDT)
- FIPS code: 26-03280
- GNIS feature ID: 1625844
- Website: www.arcadiatownship.org

Arcadia Township is a civil township of Lapeer County in the U.S. state of Michigan. Its population was 3,148 at the 2020 Census. It was organized in 1857.

== Communities ==
=== Five Lakes ===
Five Lakes, formerly Asa, is an unincorporated community on the boundary between Arcadia Township to the east and Mayfield Township to the west. It was first settled in 1855 and named for the nearby lakes.

=== Kings Mill ===
Kings Mill is an unincorporated community in the township at 43°08′32″N 83°10′22″W. The settlement formed around the grist mill and sawmill of Harvey King. It was a station on the Pontiac, Oxford and Port Austin Railroad (later part of the Grand Trunk Western Railroad). A post office operated from December 4, 1883, to February 15, 1934.

=== Lum ===
Lum is an unincorporated community in the township at 43°05′58″N 83°09′04″W. Lum was a station on the Pontiac, Oxford and Northern Railroad (later part of the Grand Trunk Western Railroad) It was named by Wallace Huntley for Colonel Lum, under whom he had served in the American Civil War.

== History ==
Five Lakes was settled in 1855. Three sawmills were built there with one on the Mayfield Township side. On May 28, 1869, a Five Lakes post office under postmaster William G. Stone, an inn-keeper, opened. The post office on April 6, 1874, was renamed to Asa but on April 29, 1878, returned to the Five Lakes name. A post office opened at King's Mill on December 4, 1883. The Lum settled as early as 1850's there was a school built before 1874. Elijah Vincent became the first postmaster on March 24, 1884.

In January 1909, the Lum depot suffered an explosion. The King's Mill post office closed on February 15, 1934.

== Geography ==
According to the United States Census Bureau, the township has a total area of 36.2 square miles (94 km^{2}), of which 35.3 square miles (91 km^{2}) is land and 0.9 square miles (2.3 km^{2}) (2.38%) is water.

== Demographics ==
As of the census of 2000, there were 3,197 people, 1,089 households, and 887 families residing in the township. The population density was 90.5 inhabitants per square mile (34.9/km^{2}). There were 1,134 housing units at an average density of 32.1 units per square mile (12.4 units/km^{2}). The racial makeup of the township was 98.40% White, 0.31% African American, 0.13% Native American, 0.13% Asian, 0.53% from other races, and 0.50% from two or more races. Hispanic or Latino of any race were 1.75% of the population.

There were 1,089 households, out of which 39.0% had children under the age of 18 living with them, 72.4% were married couples living together, 5.6% had a female householder with no husband present, and 18.5% were non-families. 15.3% of all households were made up of individuals, and 6.6% had someone living alone who was 65 years of age or older. The average household size was 2.91 and the average family size was 3.23.

In the township the population was spread out, with 28.0% under the age of 18, 7.0% from 18 to 24, 30.3% from 25 to 44, 25.0% from 45 to 64, and 9.7% who were 65 years of age or older. The median age was 37 years. For every 100 females, there were 107.1 males. For every 100 females age 18 and over, there were 105.0 males.

The median income for a household in the township was $56,458, and the median income for a family was $61,563. Males had a median income of $47,237 versus $24,444 for females. The per capita income for the township was $22,080. About 3.3% of families and 4.9% of the population were below the poverty line, including 6.9% of those under age 18 and 7.1% of those age 65 or over.
