= WLCO =

- Lapeer, Michigan; United States
- Broadcast area: (Daytime)
- Frequency: 1530 kHz
- Branding: Bridge 96.7

Programming
- Format: Instrumental music

Ownership
- Owner: Smile FM

History
- First air date: October 16, 1962; 63 years ago
- Former call signs: WLSP (3/14/1994–3/1/2007); WWGZ (11/8/1990–3/14/1994); WDEY (9/22/1980–11/8/1990); WTHM (11/16/1962–9/22/1980)
- Call sign meaning: "Lapeer Country" (former format)

Technical information
- Licensing authority: FCC
- Facility ID: 14225
- Class: D
- Power: 5,000 watts (daytime only)
- Transmitter coordinates: 43°01′35″N 83°17′12″W
- Translator: 96.7 W244EN (Lapeer)

Links
- Public license information: Public file; LMS
- Website: bridgeradio.net

WLCO (1530 AM) is a radio station broadcasting a music format primarily featuring instrumental versions of classic hits songs. Owned by Smile FM, the station is branded as "Bridge 96.7," in reference to its FM translator at 96.7 FM. Licensed to Lapeer, Michigan, it first began broadcasting under the WTHM call sign in 1962. Until December 2019, it broadcast a country music format using Westwood One's Real Country, which combines classic country favorites with select current titles. Prior to that, as WLSP, the station had aired satellite-fed adult standards from ABC (Timeless Classics), and, prior to that, Talk and Sports formats.

WTHM first went on the air November 16, 1962, adding an FM sister station on 103.1 in 1968. The WTHM call letters are derived from THuMb indicating that the signal covers the Thumb region of Michigan. WTHM-AM/FM was a full-service station featuring MOR/adult contemporary music. Later on the call sign on both AM and FM were switched to WDEY; the music format remained AC.

WDEY-AM/FM had been owned for many years by James Sommerville, who sold both to Covenant Communications in 1991. WDEY switched to a country format as "Country Gold" with the WWGZ calls in the early 1990s, before adopting an all-sports format and the new call sign WLSP in 1994.

Both WLSP and WRXF-FM were sold in December 2001 to Regent Communications (now Townsquare Media) for $1.3 million. Both stations then moved from their longtime location at 286 West Nepessing Street in Lapeer to join their new Regent affiliate stations at G-3338 East Bristol Road in the Flint suburb of Burton. WLSP dropped sports in 2002 for a talk format featuring programming from the Michigan Talk Radio Network, before switching to adult standards as "Unforgettable 1530" (using ABC Radio's "Stardust" format) in January 2004. The station adopted the "Real Country" format and WLCO calls on March 1, 2007.

On December 2, 2019, WLCO fell silent due to an equipment failure at the station's transmitter site. It returned to the air by September 20, 2020, simulcasting the classic rock format of its then sister station WQUS.

WLCO operates from local sunrise to local sunset to protect Clear-channel station WCKY in Cincinnati, Ohio.

Effective March 3, 2022, Townsquare Media sold WLCO to Smile FM for $172,500. After an initial period of stunting with Christmas music, it began playing its current format of instrumental music in early 2023, adding a simulcast on translator 96.7 W244EN, which had previously rebroadcast Smile FM's flagship contemporary Christian format.
