= Lapeer County Courthouse =

- U.S. National Register of Historic Places
- Michigan State Historic Site
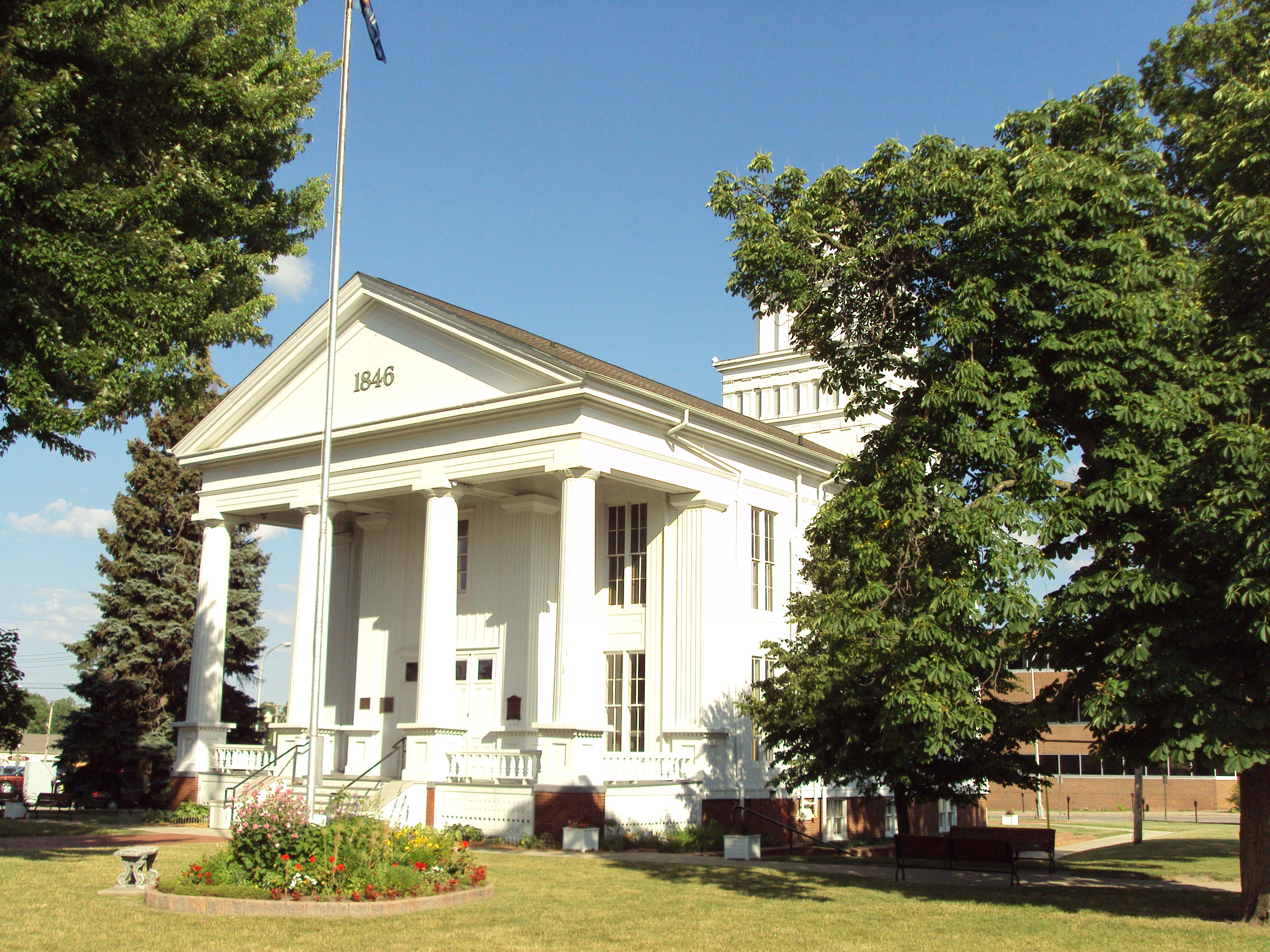

- Location within Michigan Location within the United States
- Interactive map
- Location: Courthouse Square on West Nepessing Street; Lapeer, Michigan
- Coordinates: 43°03′14″N 83°18′39″W
- Built: 1845–1846
- Architectural style: Greek Revival
- NRHP reference No.: 71000402

Significant dates
- Added to NRHP: September 3, 1971
- Designated MSHS: September 17, 1957

The Lapeer County Courthouse is a county courthouse located on Courthouse Square along West Nepessing Street in the city of Lapeer in Lapeer County, Michigan. It was designated as a Michigan State Historic Site on September 17, 1957, and later added to the National Register of Historic Places on September 3, 1971. It was the first property in Lapeer County to be listed on either registry.

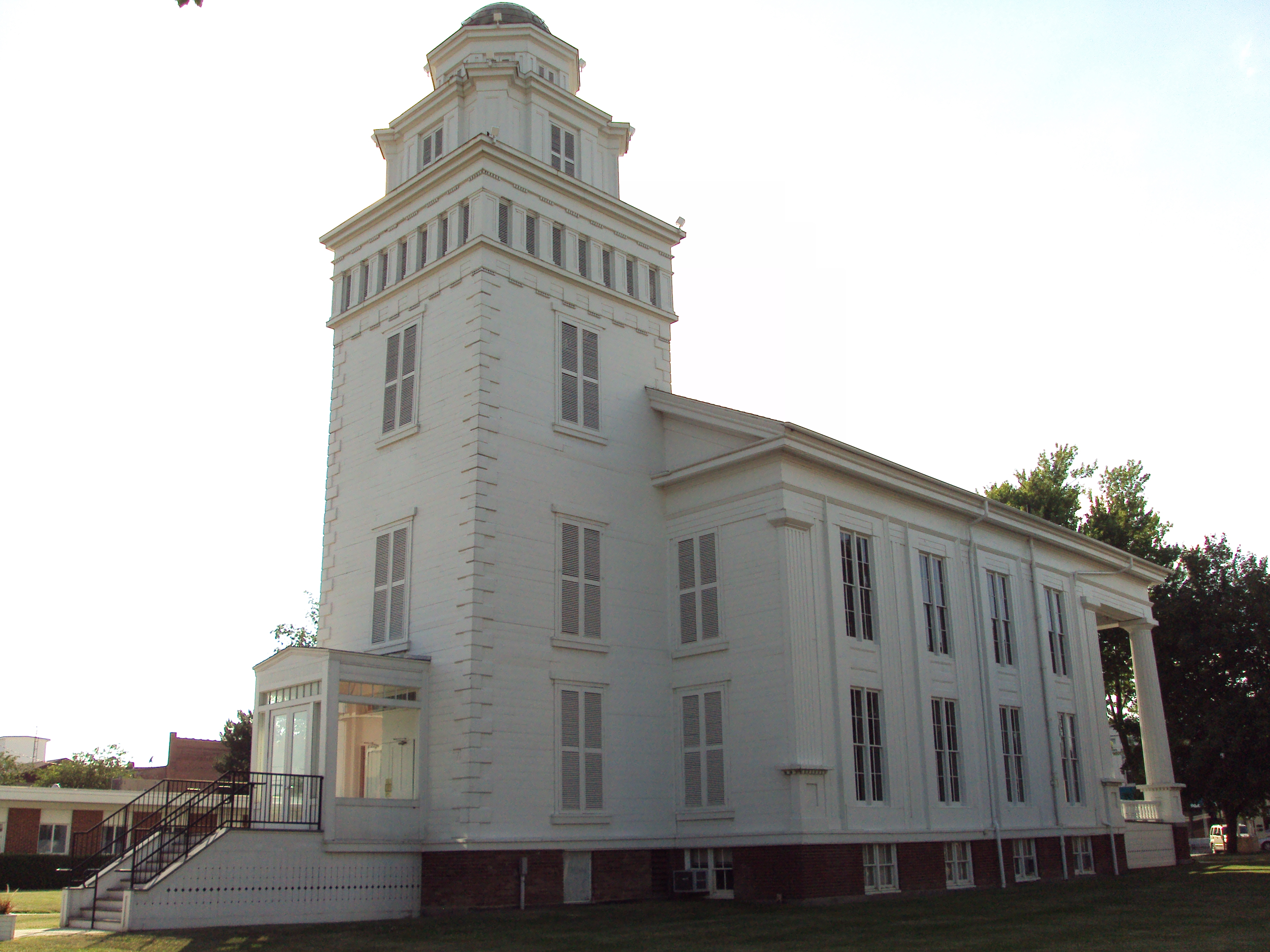
Back view of the courthouse

The courthouse is a rectangular, wood, two-story structure built on a raised foundation in the style of Greek Revival architecture. On the inside, a circuit court room is located on the second floor with jury room; administrative offices are located on the ground floor; and restrooms are located in the basement. The building also houses a Lapeer County Historical Society display with some vintage furnishings. With limited space, the police station, probate court, jail, and several other offices and courtrooms are now located behind the courthouse in a newer complex located at 255 Clay Street.

The Lapeer County Courthouse is among the earliest of its kind built in the state. It is recognized as the oldest original courthouse structure still in use in the state of Michigan and one of the 10 oldest such structures in all of the country. Lapeer County was formed in 1822 with the city of Lapeer being established as the county seat in 1831. The structure is recognized as having been first constructed in 1839, although this represents an earlier structure built on the site. The date on the pediment states 1846, which is the date that the current structure was completed—having been started the previous year. It was commissioned by state representative and state senator Alvin N. Hart, who lobbied successfully for Lapeer to continue to serve as the county seat. Hart sold the structure to the Board of Supervisors of Lapeer County for $4,500 in 1853. The first local Grange in Michigan was founded at this site in 1872. Since its construction, the only alteration to the structure occurred when three doorways were cut into the portico in 1938.

The property is owned by the Lapeer County Historical Society and is open for tours during special events. It can also be rented.
