= Lapeer, Michigan =

- City
- City of Lapeer
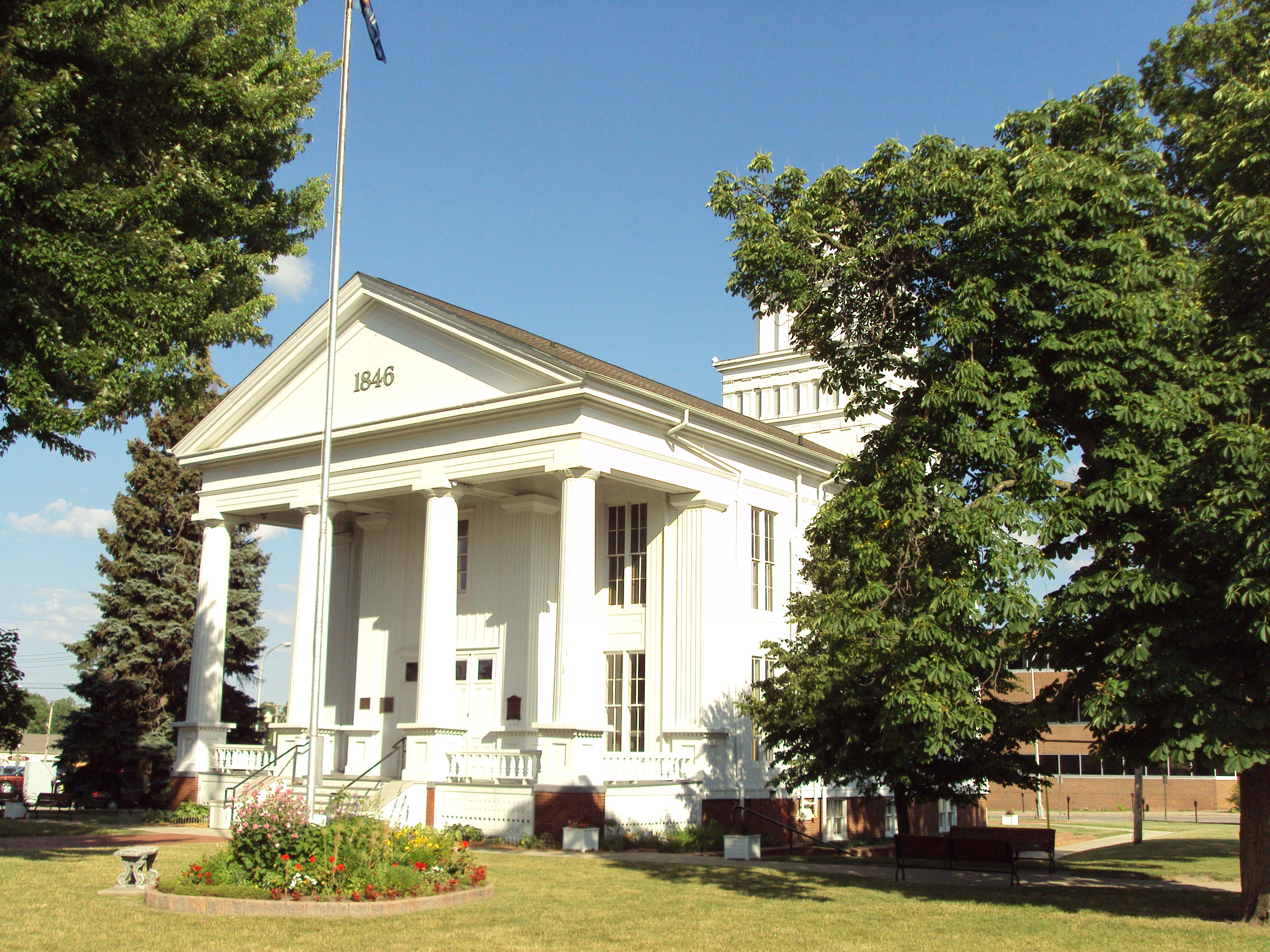
- Lapeer County Courthouse

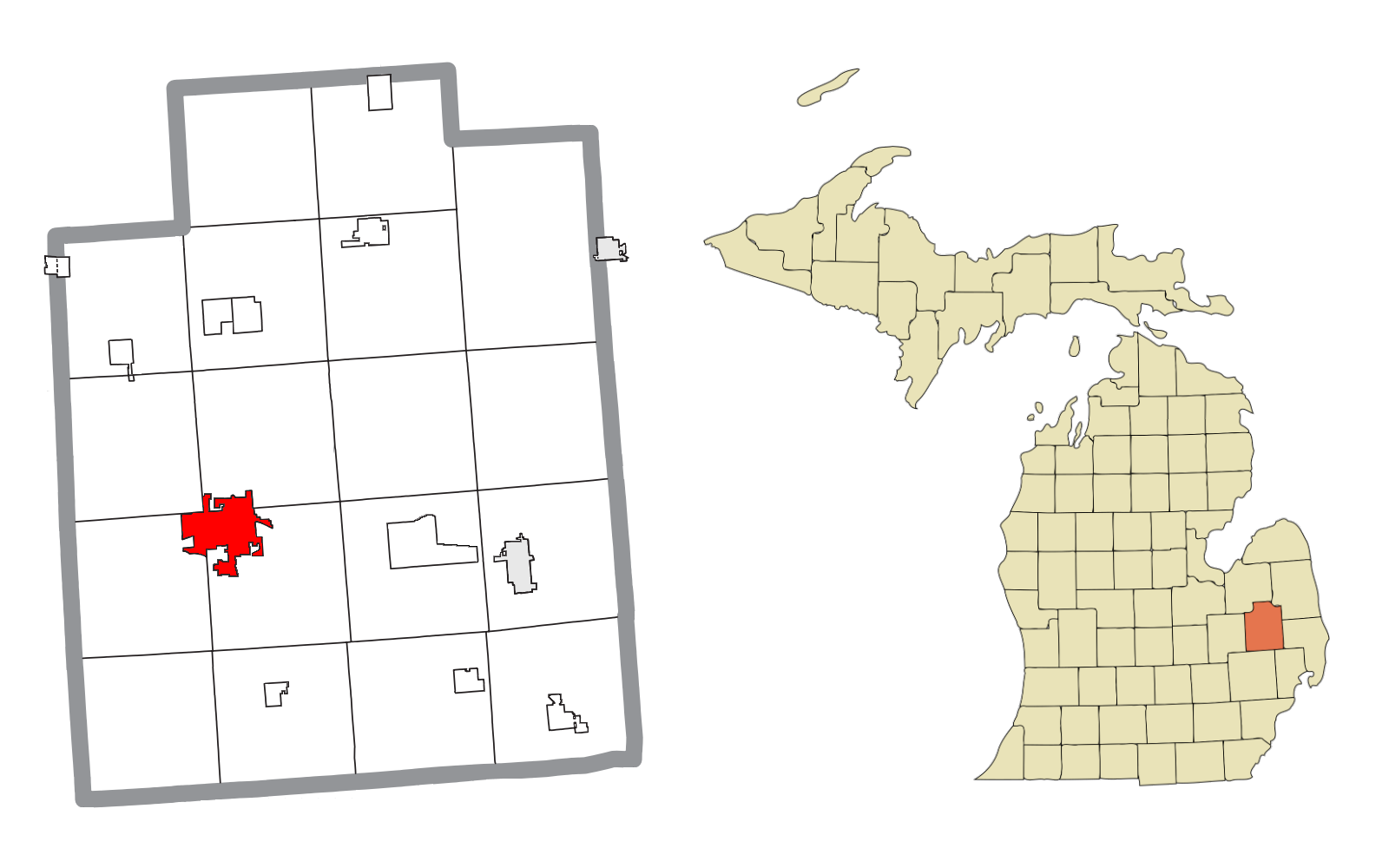
- Location within Lapeer County

- Location within the state of Michigan Location within the United States
- Coordinates: 43°03′7″N 83°18′59″W
- Country: United States
- State: Michigan
- County: Lapeer
- Settled: 1831
- Incorporated: 1858 (village); 1869 (city)

Government
  - Type: City commission
  - Mayor: Jeramy Hing
  - Clerk: Romona Sanchez
  - Manager: Mike Womack

Area
  - Total: 7.51 sq mi (19.46 km^{2})
  - Land: 7.34 sq mi (19.02 km^{2})
  - Water: 0.17 sq mi (0.44 km^{2})
- Elevation: 856 ft (261 m)

Population (2020)
  - Total: 9,023
  - Density: 1,229.29/sq mi (474.63/km^{2})
- Time zone: UTC-5 (Eastern (EST))
  - Summer (DST): UTC-4 (EDT)
- ZIP code: 48446
- Area code: 810
- FIPS code: 26-46040
- GNIS feature ID: 0630146
- Website: Official website

Lapeer (/ləˈpɪər/ lə-PEER) is a city in the U.S. state of Michigan and is the county seat of Lapeer County. As of the 2020 census, the city population was 9,023. Most of the city was incorporated from land that was formerly in Lapeer Township, though portions were also annexed from Mayfield Township and Elba Township. Lapeer is in central Michigan, east of Flint, on the Flint River.

== History ==
By an ordinance of the Congress of the United States passed on July 13, 1787, the area lying northwest of the Ohio River, though still occupied by the British, was organized as the Northwest Territory. Lapeer County was once part of the Northwest Territory. In January 1820, the county of Oakland was formed, which served the area now known as Lapeer, until the County of Lapeer was formed in 1837, when Michigan became a state. The first elections were for county officers, with 520 persons voting in 1837.

Folklore claims Lapeer was derived from the naming of the south branch of the Flint River, which flows northwestward in Lapeer County. French and Indian traders frequently passed over this section of the county and through the river, ultimately naming the city for the stone that lay at the river bottom. In French, stone is called "la pierre"; the English pronunciation of these words gives Lapeer. The river was named Flint, synonymous with stone. (See List of Michigan county name etymologies.)

It is also believed that the first settlers who came from New York State may have brought the name Lapeer from a similarly named city in their home state. A third supposition is that French missionaries named the city Le Pere, meaning The Father.

The first settlers in Lapeer were a group of men named Alvin N. Hart, Oliver B. Hart, and J.B. Morse. The most prominent of the three, Alvin N. Hart, was born in Cornwall, Connecticut, on February 11, 1804. He came to Lapeer in 1831 and platted the Village of Lapeer, November 8, 1833. The plat was registered in Pontiac on December 14, 1833, in the County of Oakland; four years before Michigan became a state and Lapeer became a county. Alvin N. Hart became a State Senator in 1843, representing Lapeer, Oakland, Genesee, Shiawassee, Tuscola, Saginaw Counties and the entire Upper Peninsula. He was instrumental in having the State Capitol relocated from Detroit to Lansing. Hart died on August 22, 1874, and is buried in Lapeer.

The second group of settlers were Enoch J. White and his family. He was born in South Hadley, Massachusetts in 1814. He came to Lapeer in 1833. Of pioneer stock, Alvin N. Hart and Enoch J. White both had the initiative to start new communities. Mr. Hart formed Lapeer and Mr. White formed what was then known as Whitesville, which now consists of the western portion of Lapeer. A tamarack swamp once separated these two settlements.

Other distinguished natives include John T. Rich, former governor of the state of Michigan; Louis C. Cramton, special assistant to the U.S. Secretary of the Interior in 1931 and 1932. He led studies of the area around the Colorado River that led to the establishment of the first National Recreation Area, Lake Mead National Recreation Area; Charles Potter, whose son became a U.S. Senator; William Reed, Big Ten Football Commissioner; and Marguerite deAngeli, internationally known writer of children's books.

At one time, there were two courthouses. The White family erected one at the present site of the Old Lapeer High School at Main and Genesee Streets, while the Hart family erected one at Nepessing and Court Streets. The Board of Supervisors purchased the Hart courthouse for $3,000, which is now the oldest continuously running courthouse in the state of Michigan and one of the oldest 10 courthouses in the United States. White's courthouse later became the first school in Lapeer called Lapeer Academy.

Over time, it became evident that the business district would be near the Courthouse, so the city's founders moved the Opera House piece-by-piece to its present location at the southeast corner of Court and Nepessing Streets in 1879. The building is now known as the White Block.

Lapeer's first church was the Congregational Church; organized in 1833, the same year Lapeer was platted. The Methodist Episcopal Church opened its doors a year later, followed by the Baptist Church in 1858, the Immaculate Conception Catholic Church in 1866, the Universalist Church in 1873, the Methodist Protestant Church in 1877 and the Grace Episcopal Church in 1882.

Lumbering was the sole industry in the early days of Lapeer. The flourishing lumber business attracted the New York Central Railroad and Grand Trunk Railroad. Lapeer later became the intersection to two state trunk lines: M-21 and M-24. Industries today supply the automotive industry with gray iron casting, molded plastics, plastic fabrics, electrical harnesses and stamping.

On October 26, 2010, Lapeer became a founding member of the Karegnondi Water Authority.

On August 15, 2012, the fourth-largest Powerball jackpot was won from a ticket sold at a Sunoco station in Lapeer. The jackpot had an annuity value of $337 million.

== Geography ==
According to the United States Census Bureau, the city has a total area of 7.38 square miles (19.11 km^{2}), of which 7.13 square miles (18.47 km^{2}) is land and 0.25 square miles (0.65 km^{2}) is water. It is considered to be part of the Thumb of Michigan, which in turn is a subregion of the Flint/Tri-Cities.

=== Climate ===
Climate data for Lapeer WWTP, Michigan (1991–2020 normals, extremes 1949–present)
Month	Jan	Feb	Mar	Apr	May	Jun	Jul	Aug	Sep	Oct	Nov	Dec	Year
Record high °F (°C)	66 (19)	68 (20)	87 (31)	87 (31)	93 (34)	100 (38)	100 (38)	99 (37)	98 (37)	89 (32)	80 (27)	69 (21)	100 (38)
Mean daily maximum °F (°C)	30.0 (−1.1)	33.0 (0.6)	43.1 (6.2)	56.4 (13.6)	69.0 (20.6)	78.5 (25.8)	82.4 (28.0)	80.5 (26.9)	74.0 (23.3)	61.0 (16.1)	47.0 (8.3)	35.6 (2.0)	57.5 (14.2)
Daily mean °F (°C)	22.5 (−5.3)	24.1 (−4.4)	33.3 (0.7)	44.9 (7.2)	57.1 (13.9)	66.9 (19.4)	70.9 (21.6)	69.1 (20.6)	62.1 (16.7)	50.5 (10.3)	38.7 (3.7)	28.9 (−1.7)	47.4 (8.6)
Mean daily minimum °F (°C)	15.1 (−9.4)	15.2 (−9.3)	23.4 (−4.8)	33.5 (0.8)	45.2 (7.3)	55.3 (12.9)	59.4 (15.2)	57.7 (14.3)	50.1 (10.1)	40.1 (4.5)	30.4 (−0.9)	22.1 (−5.5)	37.3 (2.9)
Record low °F (°C)	−26 (−32)	−24 (−31)	−17 (−27)	4 (−16)	23 (−5)	31 (−1)	36 (2)	29 (−2)	25 (−4)	17 (−8)	1 (−17)	−15 (−26)	−26 (−32)
Average precipitation inches (mm)	2.25 (57)	1.87 (47)	1.91 (49)	3.06 (78)	3.24 (82)	3.09 (78)	3.33 (85)	3.10 (79)	2.81 (71)	2.87 (73)	2.42 (61)	1.94 (49)	31.89 (810)
Average snowfall inches (cm)	10.8 (27)	8.2 (21)	4.8 (12)	1.0 (2.5)	0.0 (0.0)	0.0 (0.0)	0.0 (0.0)	0.0 (0.0)	0.0 (0.0)	0.1 (0.25)	1.9 (4.8)	7.6 (19)	34.4 (87)
Average precipitation days (≥ 0.01 in)	11.5	9.2	8.3	10.5	11.1	9.5	8.6	9.6	9.0	10.9	9.9	10.8	118.9
Average snowy days (≥ 0.1 in)	7.5	6.3	2.7	0.8	0.0	0.0	0.0	0.0	0.0	0.1	0.9	5.6	23.9
Source: NOAA

== Demographics ==
Historical population
Census	Pop.	Note	%±
1870	1,772		—
1880	2,911		64.3%
1890	2,753		−5.4%
1900	3,297		19.8%
1910	3,946		19.7%
1920	4,723		19.7%
1930	5,008		6.0%
1940	5,365		7.1%
1950	6,143		14.5%
1960	6,160		0.3%
1970	6,314		2.5%
1980	6,198		−1.8%
1990	7,759		25.2%
2000	9,072		16.9%
2010	8,841		−2.5%
2020	9,023		2.1%
U.S. Decennial Census; 2010 2020

=== 2020 census ===
As of the 2020 census, Lapeer had a population of 9,023. The population density was 1,201.5 inhabitants per square mile (463.9/km^{2}). The median age was 39.8 years. 19.9% of residents were under the age of 18 and 17.9% of residents were 65 years of age or older. For every 100 females there were 109.7 males, and for every 100 females age 18 and over there were 109.1 males age 18 and over.

99.2% of residents lived in urban areas, while 0.8% lived in rural areas.

There were 3,684 households in Lapeer, of which 26.4% had children under the age of 18 living in them. Of all households, 29.2% were married-couple households, 21.1% were households with a male householder and no spouse or partner present, and 41.0% were households with a female householder and no spouse or partner present. About 41.6% of all households were made up of individuals and 18.1% had someone living alone who was 65 years of age or older.

There were 3,921 housing units at an average density of 522.1 per square mile (201.6/km^{2}), of which 6.0% were vacant. The homeowner vacancy rate was 2.2% and the rental vacancy rate was 4.4%.

Racial composition as of the 2020 census
Race	Number	Percent
White	7,546	83.6%
Black or African American	695	7.7%
American Indian and Alaska Native	41	0.5%
Asian	67	0.7%
Native Hawaiian and Other Pacific Islander	0	0.0%
Some other race	97	1.1%
Two or more races	577	6.4%
Hispanic or Latino (of any race)	397	4.4%

=== 2010 census ===
As of the census of 2010, there were 8,841 people, 3,446 households, and 1,927 families living in the city. The population density was 1,240.0 inhabitants per square mile (478.8/km^{2}). There were 3,956 housing units at an average density of 554.8 per square mile (214.2/km^{2}). The racial makeup of the city was 88.6% White, 7.6% African American, 0.6% Native American, 0.8% Asian, 0.5% from other races, and 1.8% from two or more races. Hispanic or Latino of any race were 3.9% of the population.

There were 3,446 households, of which 32.6% had children under the age of 18 living with them, 32.1% were married couples living together, 18.3% had a female householder with no husband present, 5.5% had a male householder with no wife present, and 44.1% were non-families. 39.2% of all households were made up of individuals, and 15.6% had someone living alone who was 65 years of age or older. The average household size was 2.22 and the average family size was 2.97.

The median age in the city was 36 years. 24.1% of residents were under the age of 18; 11% were between the ages of 18 and 24; 27.2% were from 25 to 44; 24.2% were from 45 to 64; and 13.5% were 65 years of age or older. The gender makeup of the city was 51.5% male and 48.5% female.

=== 2000 census ===
As of the census of 2000, there were 9,072 people, 3,443 households, and 1,979 families living in the city. The population density was 1,635.5 inhabitants per square mile (631.5/km^{2}). There were 3,658 housing units at an average density of 659.5 per square mile (254.6/km^{2}). The racial makeup of the city was 89.91% White, 5.95% African American, 0.47% Native American, 0.57% Asian, 0.03% Pacific Islander, 1.09% from other races, and 1.96% from two or more races. Hispanic or Latino of any race were 3.33% of the population.

There were 3,443 households, out of which 33.0% had children under the age of 18 living with them, 38.3% were married couples living together, 15.7% had a female householder with no husband present, and 42.5% were non-families. 36.8% of all households were made up of individuals, and 14.2% had someone living alone who was 65 years of age or older. The average household size was 2.29 and the average family size was 3.02.

In the city, the population was spread out, with 24.6% under the age of 18, 9.9% from 18 to 24, 36.5% from 25 to 44, 17.1% from 45 to 64, and 11.9% who were 65 years of age or older. The median age was 33 years. For every 100 females, there were 106.8 males. For every 100 females age 18 and over, there were 110.6 males.

The median income for a household in the city was $35,526, and the median income for a family was $42,872. Males had a median income of $36,731 versus $24,552 for females. The per capita income for the city was $16,608. About 8.5% of families and 10.2% of the population were below the poverty line, including 12.3% of those under age 18 and 12.1% of those age 65 or over.

== Government and infrastructure ==
The city levies an income tax of 1 percent on residents and 0.5 percent on nonresidents. Lapeer is a member of Karegnondi Water Authority and of the Greater Lapeer County Utilities Authority. Lapeer is served by the Lapeer District Library.

== Notable people ==
- Thomas Carrigan – silent film actor
- Marguerite de Angeli – writer and illustrator of children's books, including the 1950 Newbery Award-winning book The Door in the Wall
- Roger Kish – wrestler and coach
- Terry Knight – producer of music groups Grand Funk Railroad and Bloodrock
- Jake Long – University of Michigan offensive lineman and 2008 first overall NFL draft pick
- Terry Nichols – Oklahoma City bombing conspirator
- Victor Prather – set an altitude record for manned balloon flight in 1960 (held until 2012); helped develop the space suit
- Rob Rubick – football player, Detroit Lions tight end
- Jim Slater – professional hockey player for the Winnipeg Jets
- Kris Tamulis – professional golfer
- Maxx Crosby – football player, Las Vegas Raiders defensive end

== Transportation ==
=== Major highways ===
- I-69 – runs east and west south of the city
- M-24 – runs north and south through the city
- M-21 – previously ran through Lapeer but its designation was removed east of Flint after the completion of I-69.

=== Rail and bus ===
Amtrak, the national passenger rail system, provides service to Lapeer, operating its Blue Water daily in both directions between Chicago and Port Huron.

Greater Lapeer Transportation Authority (GLTA) is the local public bus system serving Lapeer and the surrounding area.

== Media ==
=== Radio ===
The thumb area is an unranked radio area. Local radio in Lapeer includes WLCO AM, WQUS FM, and WMPC AM.

==== FM ====
- WMPC 106.9 FM, "Where many preach Christ"
- WWBN 101.5 FM, Flint's Banana 101.5
- WNFR 90.7 FM, Port Huron, Christian Radio
- WIDL 92.1 FM, Cass City
- WBGV 92.5 FM, Marlette, Today's Best Country
- WQUS 103.1 FM, Lapeer, "US 103.1" Classic Hits
- WCZE 103.7 FM Harbor Beach / WHYT 88.1 FM Imlay City, Smile FM

=== Online ===
- Solid State Radio
- WMPC Radio simulcast https://www.wmpc.org

==== AM ====
- WMIC 660 AM, Sandusky, The Thumb's Information Station (Daytime Only)
- WMPC 1230 AM, Lapeer, Gospel 1230
- WLCO 1530 AM, Lapeer, Real Country (Daytime Only)

=== Newspaper ===
- The County Press is a local newspaper, published Sundays and Wednesdays.
- The Lapeer Area View is a free local newspaper, mailed to homes throughout the county every Thursday.
- Daily editions of the Flint Journal, Detroit Free Press and The Detroit News are also available throughout the area.

=== Television ===
Lapeer is in the Detroit and Flint television markets; Lapeer also receives most stations from the Flint-Saginaw-Bay City market. Charter Communications in Lapeer carry most Detroit channels and most major Flint/Tri-Cities channels.
