= Lapeer Township, Michigan =

- Civil township
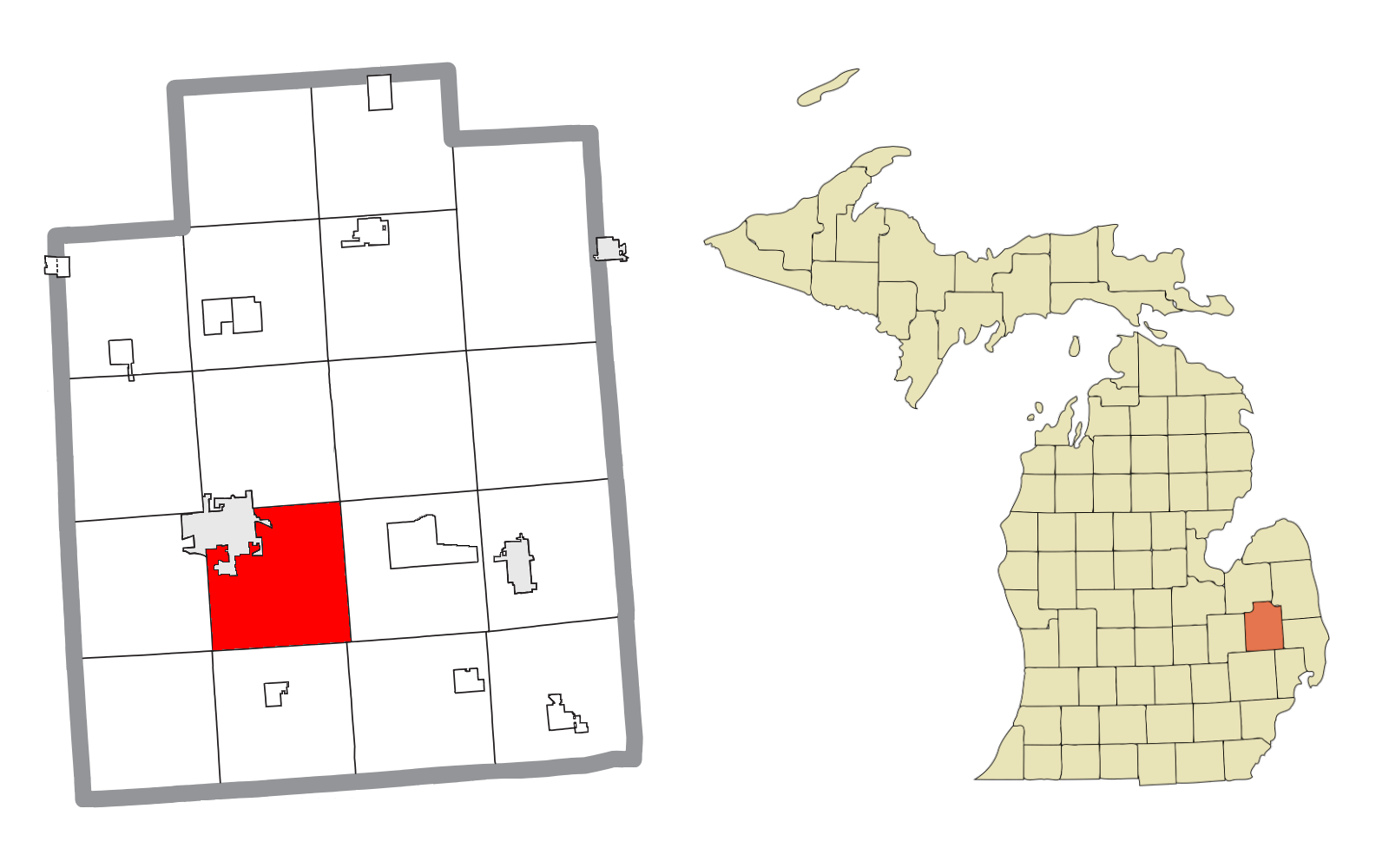
- Location within Lapeer County

- Location within the state of Michigan Location within the United States
- Coordinates: 43°01′10″N 83°17′23″W
- Country: United States
- State: Michigan
- County: Lapeer

Area
  - Total: 32.3 sq mi (83.7 km^{2})
  - Land: 32.0 sq mi (82.9 km^{2})
  - Water: 0.31 sq mi (0.8 km^{2})
- Elevation: 860 ft (262 m)

Population (2020)
  - Total: 4,956
  - Density: 155/sq mi (59.8/km^{2})
- Time zone: UTC-5 (Eastern (EST))
  - Summer (DST): UTC-4 (EDT)
- ZIP code: 48446 (Lapeer), 48412 (Attica), 48455 (Metamora)
- Area code: 810
- FIPS code: 26-46060
- GNIS feature ID: 1626591
- Website: https://www.lapeertwp.org/

Lapeer Township is a civil township of Lapeer County in the U.S. state of Michigan. The population was 4,956 at the 2020 Census. The name is an Americanization of the French La pierre, which means "flint" or "flint stone".

== Communities ==
- The city of Lapeer is located to the northwest and incorporates land from the township, but is administratively autonomous. The Lapeer post office, with ZIP code 48446, also serves most of Lapeer Township.
- Hunters Creek is an unincorporated community in the southern part of township at 42°59′08″N 83°17′38″W. The settlement was named for the nearby stream and dates from approximately 1836. A post office opened on October 30, 1857, with Harris M. Tripp as the first postmaster. It became a station on the Detroit and Bay City Railroad in 1872. John Clark built a sawmill and shingle mill in 1873.
- The community and township of Attica is to the east, and the Attica Post Office, with ZIP code 48412, also serves a portion of eastern Lapeer Township.
- The village of Metamora is to the south, and the Metamora post office, with ZIP code 48455, also serves portions of southern Lapeer Township.

== Geography ==
According to the United States Census Bureau, the township has a total area of 32.3 square miles (84 km^{2}), of which 32.0 square miles (83 km^{2}) is land and 0.3 square miles (0.78 km^{2}) (0.99%) is water.

== Demographics ==
As of the census of 2000, there were 5,078 people, 1,765 households, and 1,457 families residing in the township. The population density was 158.7 inhabitants per square mile (61.3/km^{2}). There were 1,831 housing units at an average density of 57.2 per square mile (22.1/km^{2}). The racial makeup of the township was 97.14% White, 0.30% African American, 0.22% Native American, 0.63% Asian, 0.02% Pacific Islander, 0.51% from other races, and 1.18% from two or more races. Hispanic or Latino of any race were 1.93% of the population.

There were 1,765 households, out of which 37.3% had children under the age of 18 living with them, 72.8% were married couples living together, 6.3% had a female householder with no husband present, and 17.4% were non-families. 14.0% of all households were made up of individuals, and 4.9% had someone living alone who was 65 years of age or older. The average household size was 2.85 and the average family size was 3.13.

In the township the population was spread out, with 27.1% under the age of 18, 7.3% from 18 to 24, 28.1% from 25 to 44, 27.8% from 45 to 64, and 9.6% who were 65 years of age or older. The median age was 38 years. For every 100 females, there were 102.1 males. For every 100 females age 18 and over, there were 101.3 males.

The median income for a household in the township was $63,411, and the median income for a family was $66,136. Males had a median income of $49,095 versus $27,308 for females. The per capita income for the township was $23,383. About 1.6% of families and 4.1% of the population were below the poverty line, including 5.4% of those under age 18 and 3.3% of those age 65 or over.
