= Elba Township, Lapeer County, Michigan =

Elba Township, Michigan
- Civil township
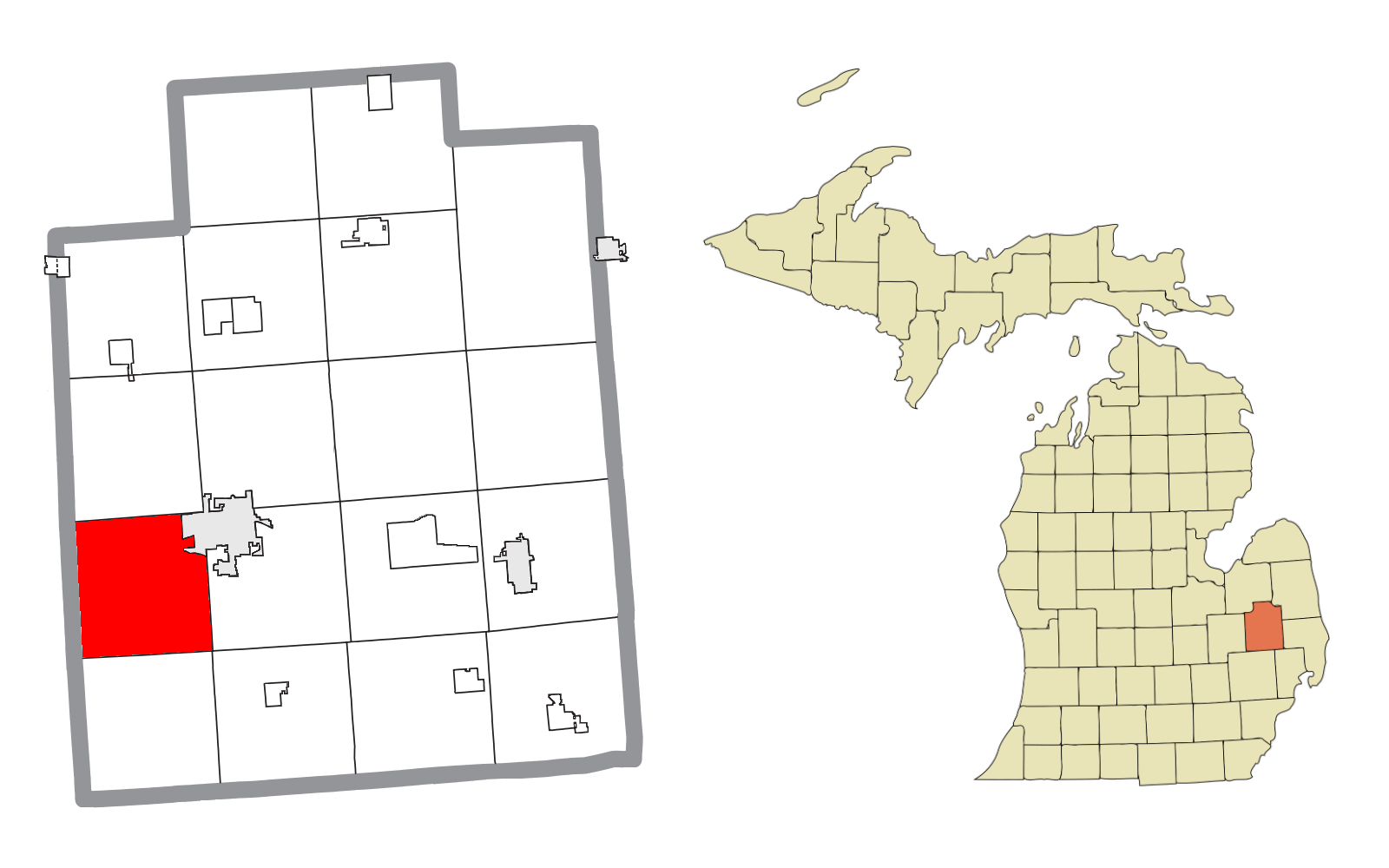
- Location within Lapeer County

- Location within the state of Michigan Location within the United States
- Coordinates: 43°01′13″N 83°24′39″W
- Country: United States
- State: Michigan
- County: Lapeer

Area
  - Total: 34.0 sq mi (88.1 km^{2})
  - Land: 32.8 sq mi (84.9 km^{2})
  - Water: 1.2 sq mi (3.1 km^{2})
- Elevation: 850 ft (259 m)

Population (2020)
  - Total: 5,235
  - Density: 160/sq mi (61.7/km^{2})
- Time zone: UTC-5 (Eastern (EST))
  - Summer (DST): UTC-4 (EDT)
- ZIP codes: 48446 (Lapeer), 48455 (Metamora)
- FIPS code: 26-25160
- GNIS feature ID: 1626222
- Website: https://elbatownship.org/

Elba Township is a civil township of Lapeer County in the U.S. state of Michigan. The population was 5,235 at the 2020 Census.

== History ==
Elba Township was established in 1838.

== Communities ==
- Elba is an unincorporated community in the township at 43°02′11″N 83°26′24″W. The first white settlers were Hozial Howland and his son Ira, who moved there from Rhode Island in 1835. The township was organized in 1838. The community of Elba was founded in 1871. A post office opened on December 26, 1871, with John Winship as the first postmaster. The office closed on September 30, 1941. Elba was a station on the Grand Trunk Western Railroad.
- The city of Lapeer is to the northeast and incorporates some land from the township. The Lapeer post office, with ZIP code 48446, also serves nearly all of Elba Township.
- The village of Metamora is to the southeast, and the Metamora post office, with ZIP code 48455, also serves a small portion of southeast Elba Township.

== Geography ==
According to the United States Census Bureau, the township has a total area of 34.0 square miles (88.1 km^{2}), of which 32.8 square miles (84.9 km^{2}) is land and 1.2 square miles (3.1 km^{2}) (3.56%) is water.

== Demographics ==
As of the census of 2000, there were 5,462 people, 1,940 households, and 1,550 families residing in the township. The population density was 166.6 inhabitants per square mile (64.3/km^{2}). There were 2,121 housing units at an average density of 64.7 per square mile (25.0/km^{2}). The racial makeup of the township was 97.25% White, 0.37% African American, 0.66% Native American, 0.15% Asian, 0.51% from other races, and 1.06% from two or more races. Hispanic or Latino of any race were 1.79% of the population. 9% of Elba was of Czech descent, 7% Slovak, and 3% Czechoslovak, making Elba the largest Czech/Slovak community in Michigan by percentage of the population.

There were 1,940 households, out of which 36.1% had children under the age of 18 living with them, 69.5% were married couples living together, 6.2% had a female householder with no husband present, and 20.1% were non-families. 15.7% of all households were made up of individuals, and 5.1% had someone living alone who was 65 years of age or older. The average household size was 2.79 and the average family size was 3.10.

In the township the population was spread out, with 26.1% under the age of 18, 7.0% from 18 to 24, 30.5% from 25 to 44, 27.1% from 45 to 64, and 9.3% who were 65 years of age or older. The median age was 38 years. For every 100 females, there were 105.6 males. For every 100 females age 18 and over, there were 103.6 males.

The median income for a household in the township was $53,614, and the median income for a family was $56,231. Males had a median income of $48,897 versus $29,609 for females. The per capita income for the township was $22,863. About 4.8% of families and 5.5% of the population were below the poverty line, including 3.6% of those under age 18 and 13.5% of those age 65 or over.
