= Attica, Michigan =

- Census-designated place (CDP) & unincorporated community
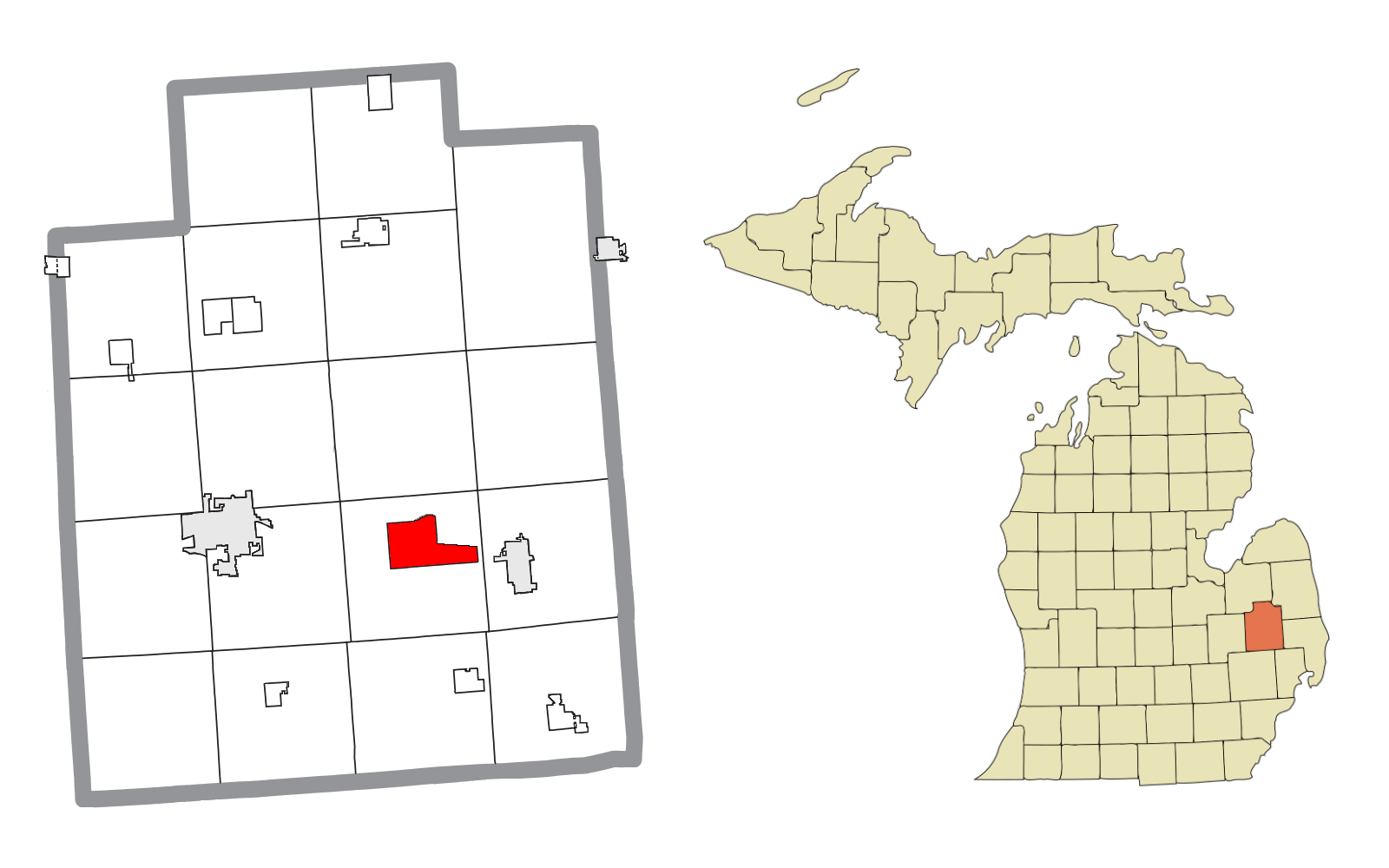
- Location within Lapeer County

- Location within the state of Michigan Location within the United States
- Coordinates: 43°01′49″N 83°09′58″W
- Country: United States
- State: Michigan
- County: Lapeer
- Township: Attica
- Settled: 1851

Area
  - Total: 4.97 sq mi (12.87 km^{2})
  - Land: 4.78 sq mi (12.37 km^{2})
  - Water: 0.19 sq mi (0.50 km^{2})
- Elevation: 896 ft (273 m)

Population (2020)
  - Total: 962
  - Density: 201.26/sq mi (77.71/km^{2})
- Time zone: UTC-5 (Eastern (EST))
  - Summer (DST): UTC-4 (EDT)
- ZIP code(s): 48412
- Area code: 810
- GNIS feature ID: 620309

Attica is an unincorporated community and census-designated place in Attica Township, Lapeer County, Michigan, United States. Its population was 962 as of the 2020 census. Attica has a post office with ZIP code 48412.

== Geography ==
Attica is in southeastern Lapeer County, north of the center of Attica Township. It is 1 mile (1.6 km) north of Interstate 69, with access from Exit 163 (Lake Pleasant Road). I-69 leads east 39 miles (63 km) to Port Huron and west 27 miles (43 km) to Flint. According to the U.S. Census Bureau, the Attica CDP has an area of 4.968 square miles (12.87 km^{2}), of which 4.775 square miles (12.37 km^{2}) are land and 0.193 square miles (0.50 km^{2}), or 3.88%, are water.

== Demographics ==
Historical population
Census	Pop.	Note	%±
2020	962		—
U.S. Decennial Census

== History ==
In 1851, William Williams from New York state built a sawmill here, and most of the settlement developed on his land. I. N. Jenness, a lumberman and also from New York, is considered as co-founder of the community. A post office named "Mill Station" was established on October 9, 1867, with Oscar A. Williams as the first postmaster. The office was renamed "Elk Lake" on September 12, 1870, and became "Attica", after the township, on February 1, 1871. The Attica Hotel, built in Attica, Michigan in the early 1870s, was originally called the Williams House and later the Schirmer House.The Williams family had 14 children, and there are five bedrooms on the second floor wing. The second floor also held a ballroom with a door leading to the second floor porch. At one time, there were a total of nine doors, and four porches, and the hotel held a post office. It was later moved to Crossroads Village in November 1981 and the exterior was restored in 1986.
