= Dryden Township, Michigan =

- Civil township
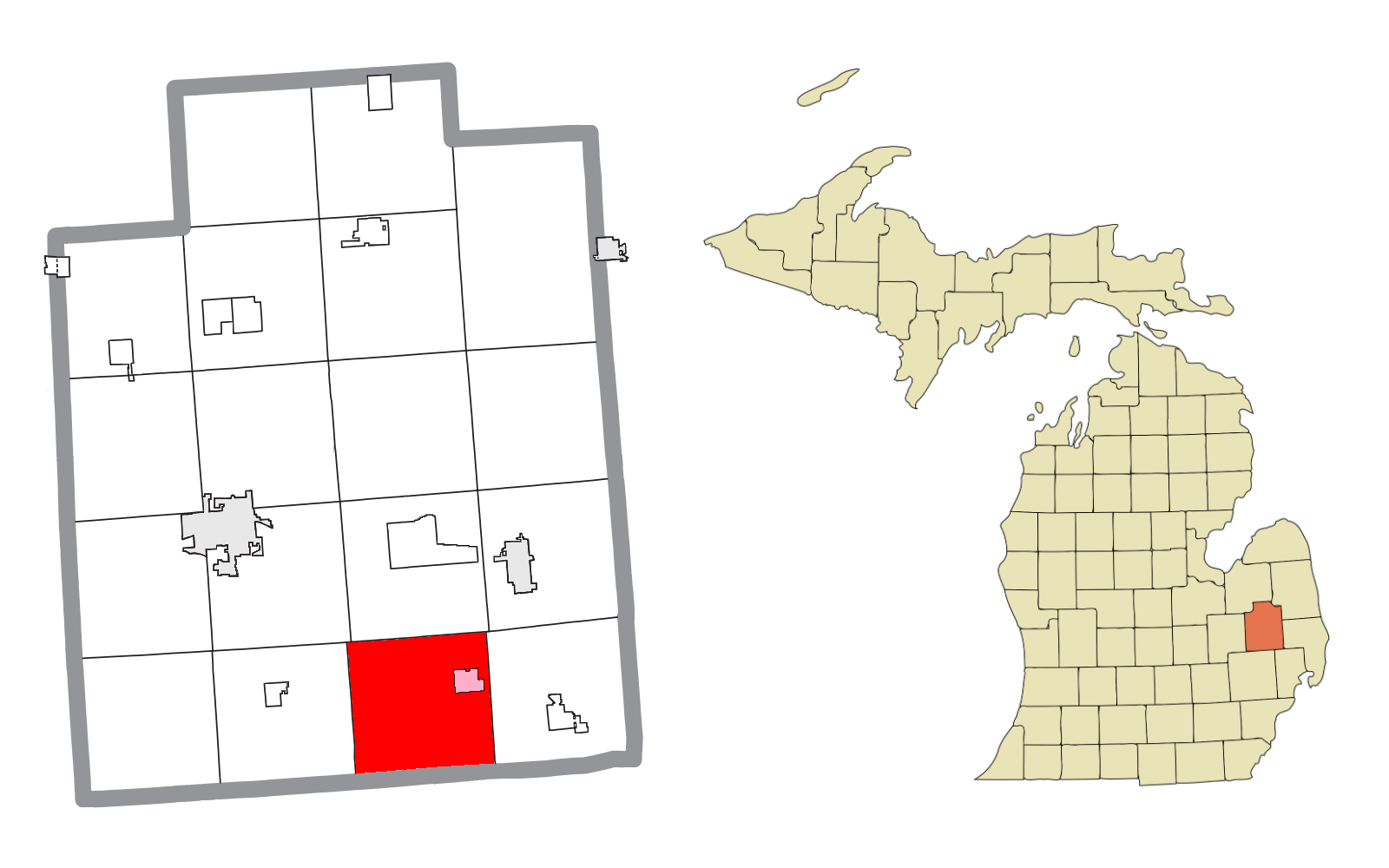
- Location within Lapeer County (red) and the administered village of Dryden (pink)

- Location within the state of Michigan Location within the United States
- Coordinates: 42°55′38″N 83°9′13″W
- Country: United States
- State: Michigan
- County: Lapeer

Area
  - Total: 36.2 sq mi (93.8 km^{2})
  - Land: 35.4 sq mi (91.8 km^{2})
  - Water: 0.73 sq mi (1.9 km^{2})
- Elevation: 1,007 ft (307 m)

Population (2020)
  - Total: 4,799
  - Density: 135/sq mi (52.3/km^{2})
- Time zone: UTC-5 (Eastern (EST))
  - Summer (DST): UTC-4 (EDT)
- ZIP code: 48428
- Area code: 810
- FIPS code: 26-23160
- GNIS feature ID: 1626194
- Website: https://www.drydentownship.com/

Dryden Township is a civil township in Lapeer County in the U.S. state of Michigan, named in honor of the literary critic, John Dryden. The population was 4,799 at the 2020 census. The village of Dryden is located within the township.

When it was first organized, the township was called Lomond Township but was given its present name by 1846.

== Geography ==
According to the United States Census Bureau, the township has a total area of 36.2 square miles (94 km^{2}), of which 35.5 square miles (92 km^{2}) is land and 0.7 square miles (1.8 km^{2}) (2.05%) is water.

== Demographics ==
As of the census of 2000, there were 4,624 people, 1,586 households, and 1,322 families residing in the township. The population density was 128.9 inhabitants per square mile (49.8/km^{2}). There were 1,673 housing units at an average density of 46.6 per square mile (18.0/km^{2}). The racial makeup of the township was 97.84% White, 0.11% African American, 0.39% Native American, 0.22% Asian, 0.48% from other races, and 0.97% from two or more races. Hispanic or Latino of any race were 1.06% of the population.

There were 1,586 households, out of which 39.1% had children under the age of 18 living with them, 75.5% were married couples living together, 4.9% had a female householder with no husband present, and 16.6% were non-families. 13.3% of all households were made up of individuals, and 3.5% had someone living alone who was 65 years of age or older. The average household size was 2.90 and the average family size was 3.19.

In the township the population was spread out, with 28.3% under the age of 18, 6.3% from 18 to 24, 31.0% from 25 to 44, 26.6% from 45 to 64, and 7.9% who were 65 years of age or older. The median age was 37 years. For every 100 females, there were 105.6 males. For every 100 females age 18 and over, there were 104.4 males.

The median income for a household in the township was $69,659, and the median income for a family was $72,065. Males had a median income of $55,872 versus $29,886 for females. The per capita income for the township was $26,902. About 2.5% of families and 2.5% of the population were below the poverty line, including 1.5% of those under age 18 and 4.1% of those age 65 or over.

== Education ==
Most of the township is in Dryden Community Schools. Other portions are in Oxford Community Schools, Almont Community Schools, and Lapeer Community Schools. Respective zoned high schools are Dryden Junior/Senior High School, Oxford High School, Almont High School, and Lapeer High School.
