= Metamora, Michigan =

- Village
- Village of Metamora
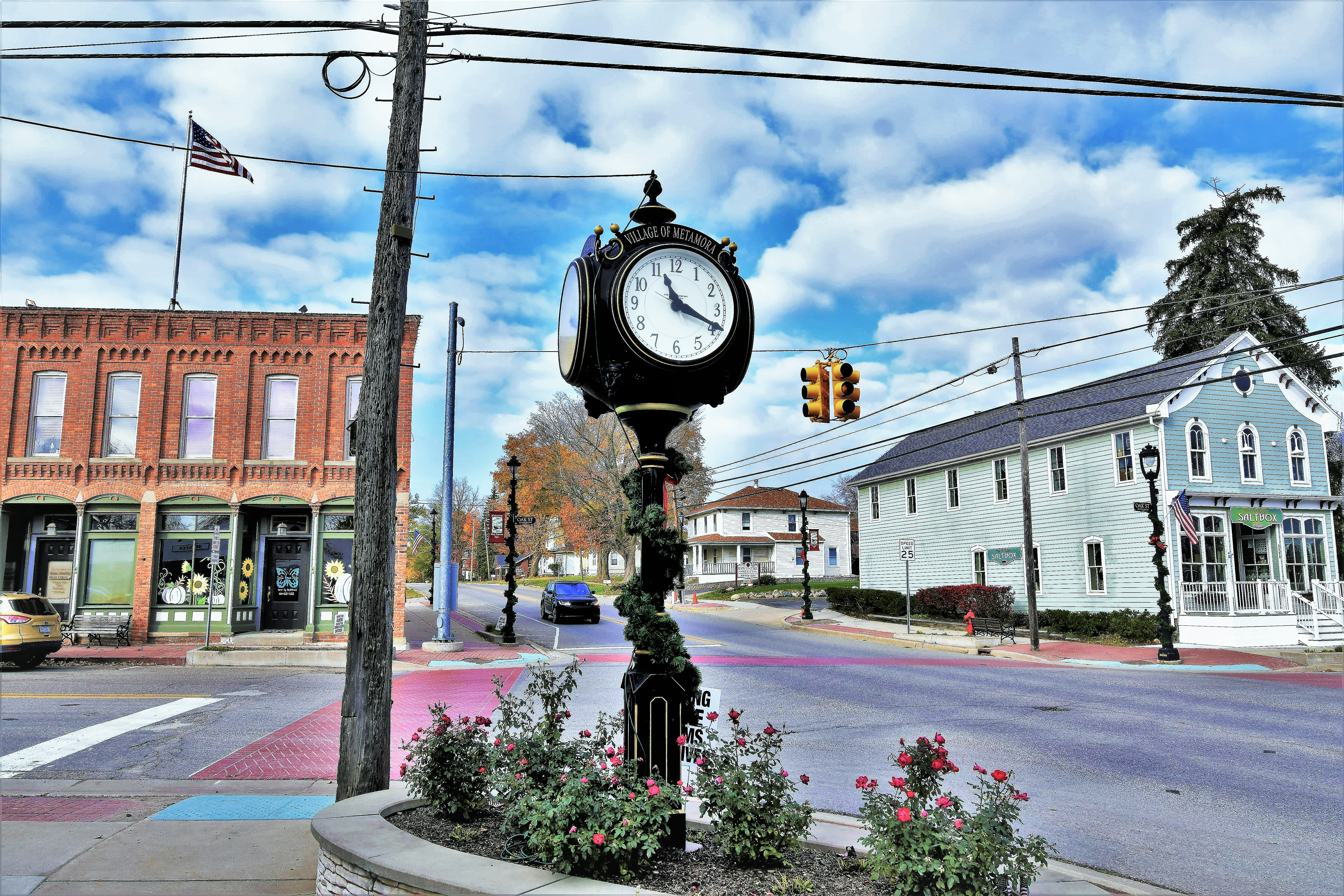
- Metamora Crossroads Historic District

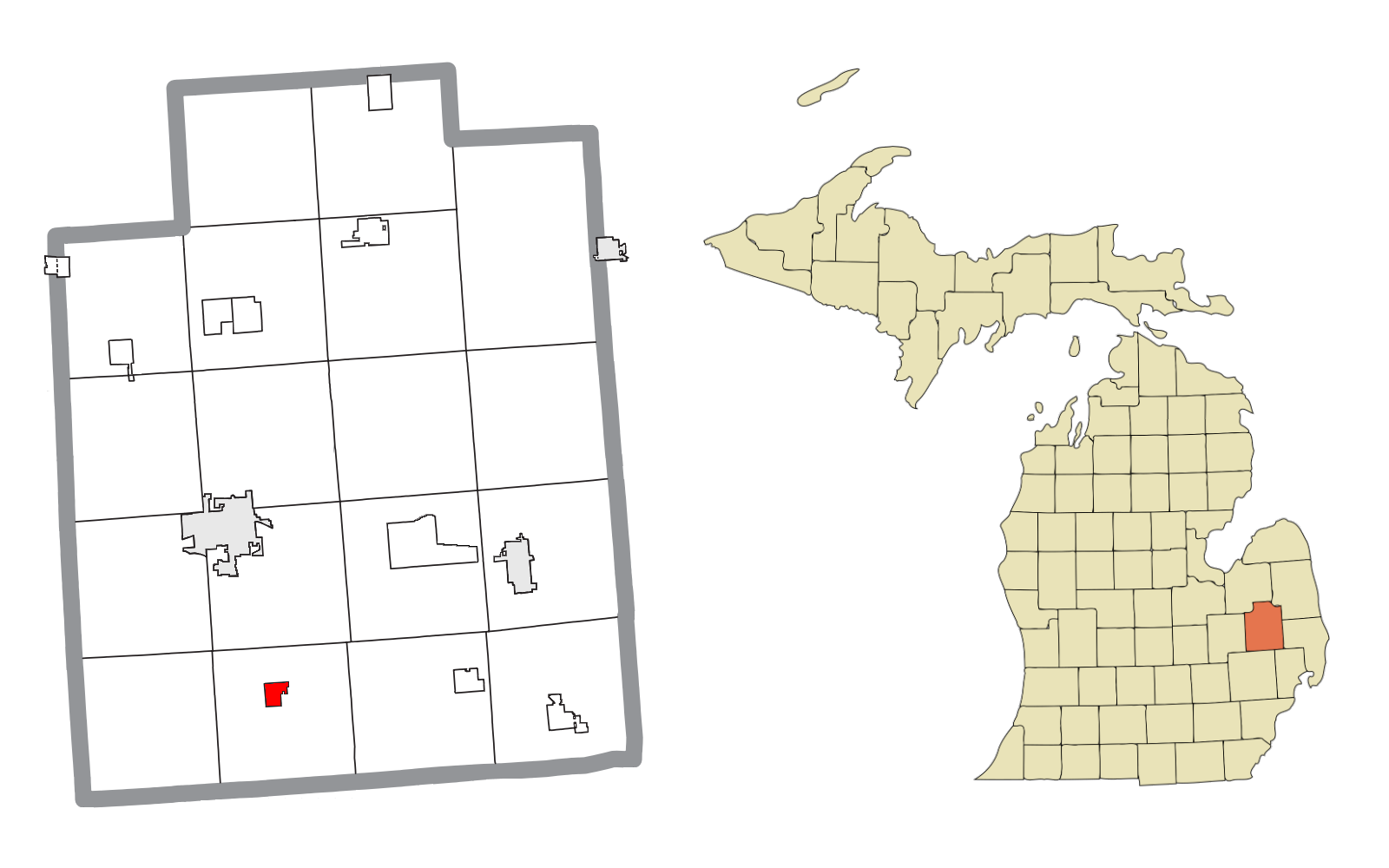
- Location within Lapeer County

- Location within the state of Michigan Location within the United States
- Coordinates: 42°56′29″N 83°17′19″W
- Country: United States
- State: Michigan
- County: Lapeer
- Township: Metamora
- Settled: 1843
- Incorporated: 1885

Government
  - Type: Village council
  - President: John Clark
  - Clerk: Tina Sauve

Area
  - Total: 0.83 sq mi (2.16 km^{2})
  - Land: 0.83 sq mi (2.15 km^{2})
  - Water: 0 sq mi (0.00 km^{2})
- Elevation: 1,043 ft (318 m)

Population (2020)
  - Total: 594
  - Density: 715.67/sq mi (276.32/km^{2})
- Time zone: UTC-5 (Eastern (EST))
  - Summer (DST): UTC-4 (EDT)
- ZIP code(s): 48455
- Area code: 810
- FIPS code: 26-53340
- GNIS feature ID: 0632164
- Website: Official website

Metamora is a village in Lapeer County in the U.S. state of Michigan. The population was 594 at the 2020 census. The village is located within Metamora Township.

== Geography ==
According to the United States Census Bureau, the village has a total area of 0.83 square miles (2.15 km^{2}), all land.

== Demographics ==
Historical population
| Census | Pop. | Note | %± |
|---|---|---|---|
| 1880 | 236 | | — |
| 1890 | 314 | | 33.1% |
| 1900 | 313 | | −0.3% |
| 1910 | 276 | | −11.8% |
| 1920 | 271 | | −1.8% |
| 1930 | 293 | | 8.1% |
| 1940 | 281 | | −4.1% |
| 1950 | 390 | | 38.8% |
| 1960 | 452 | | 15.9% |
| 1970 | 468 | | 3.5% |
| 1980 | 552 | | 17.9% |
| 1990 | 447 | | −19.0% |
| 2000 | 507 | | 13.4% |
| 2010 | 565 | | 11.4% |
| 2020 | 594 | | 5.1% |
U.S. Decennial Census

=== 2010 census ===
As of the census of 2010, there were 565 people, 216 households, and 151 families living in the village. The population density was 680.7 inhabitants per square mile (262.8/km^{2}). There were 245 housing units at an average density of 295.2 per square mile (114.0/km^{2}). The racial makeup of the village was 98.1% White, 0.4% African American, 0.5% Native American, 0.2% Asian, 0.2% from other races, and 0.7% from two or more races. Hispanic or Latino of any race were 1.4% of the population.

There were 216 households, of which 38.4% had children under the age of 18 living with them, 56.5% were married couples living together, 8.8% had a female householder with no husband present, 4.6% had a male householder with no wife present, and 30.1% were non-families. 24.5% of all households were made up of individuals, and 7.4% had someone living alone who was 65 years of age or older. The average household size was 2.62 and the average family size was 3.11.

The median age in the village was 39.4 years. 27.8% of residents were under the age of 18; 5.6% were between the ages of 18 and 24; 24.1% were from 25 to 44; 30.7% were from 45 to 64; and 11.7% were 65 years of age or older. The gender makeup of the village was 48.5% male and 51.5% female.

=== 2000 census ===
As of the census of 2000, there were 507 people, 188 households, and 137 families living in the village. The population density was 765.4 inhabitants per square mile (295.5/km^{2}). There were 204 housing units at an average density of 308.0 per square mile (118.9/km^{2}). The racial makeup of the village was 96.84% White, 0.39% Native American, 0.20% Asian, and 2.56% from two or more races. Hispanic or Latino of any race were 0.79% of the population.

There were 188 households, out of which 33.0% had children under the age of 18 living with them, 60.6% were married couples living together, 9.6% had a female householder with no husband present, and 27.1% were non-families. 19.7% of all households were made up of individuals, and 6.4% had someone living alone who was 65 years of age or older. The average household size was 2.70 and the average family size was 3.14.

In the village, the population was spread out, with 26.6% under the age of 18, 8.3% from 18 to 24, 34.9% from 25 to 44, 19.7% from 45 to 64, and 10.5% who were 65 years of age or older. The median age was 34 years. For every 100 females, there were 92.0 males. For every 100 females age 18 and over, there were 97.9 males.

The median income for a household in the village was $58,088, and the median income for a family was $63,750. Males had a median income of $41,563 versus $26,563 for females. The per capita income for the village was $19,548. About 3.6% of families and 3.6% of the population were below the poverty line, including 1.4% of those under age 18 and 7.4% of those age 65 or over.

== Schools ==
Metamora does not have a school system. Residents of the village attend Lapeer Community Schools, Dryden Community Schools, Oxford Community Schools, or private schools within Metro Detroit.

== White Horse Inn ==
The White Horse Inn was founded in 1850 and operated continuously for 162 years, until it closed in 2012. It was housed in the same building, built in 1850, the entire time. The Inn underwent an extensive renovation with a planned reopening in late 2014. The entire Metamora community donated time and skill to the renovation. Metamora is home to skilled craftsmen who usually work on high-end homes. Much of the materials came from the current owner's wood lot, or are recycled from a nearby farm which donated the remains of a century old barn, or from other old barns. In addition, Jean Louis Sauvat, came from France to paint charcoal images of horses on the interior wall.

== Events and attractions ==
Held annually is Metamora Country Days and Balloon Festival where about 20 balloons launch on Friday and Saturday evening. The festival is held on a late August weekend every year.

The village hosts free summer concerts, held every Thursday evening from mid-June through late August in Harmer Park.

Metamora and its surrounding township is notable for its beauty. The Metamora Hunt is a historic organization dedicated to the pursuit of foxes by horses and hounds. During the fall the hounds will often be seen being taken on hunts and take up the entire dirt road.

== Notable people ==
- Vinnie Miller, racecar driver in the NASCAR Xfinity Series.
