= Lapeer County, Michigan =

County in Michigan, United States

- County
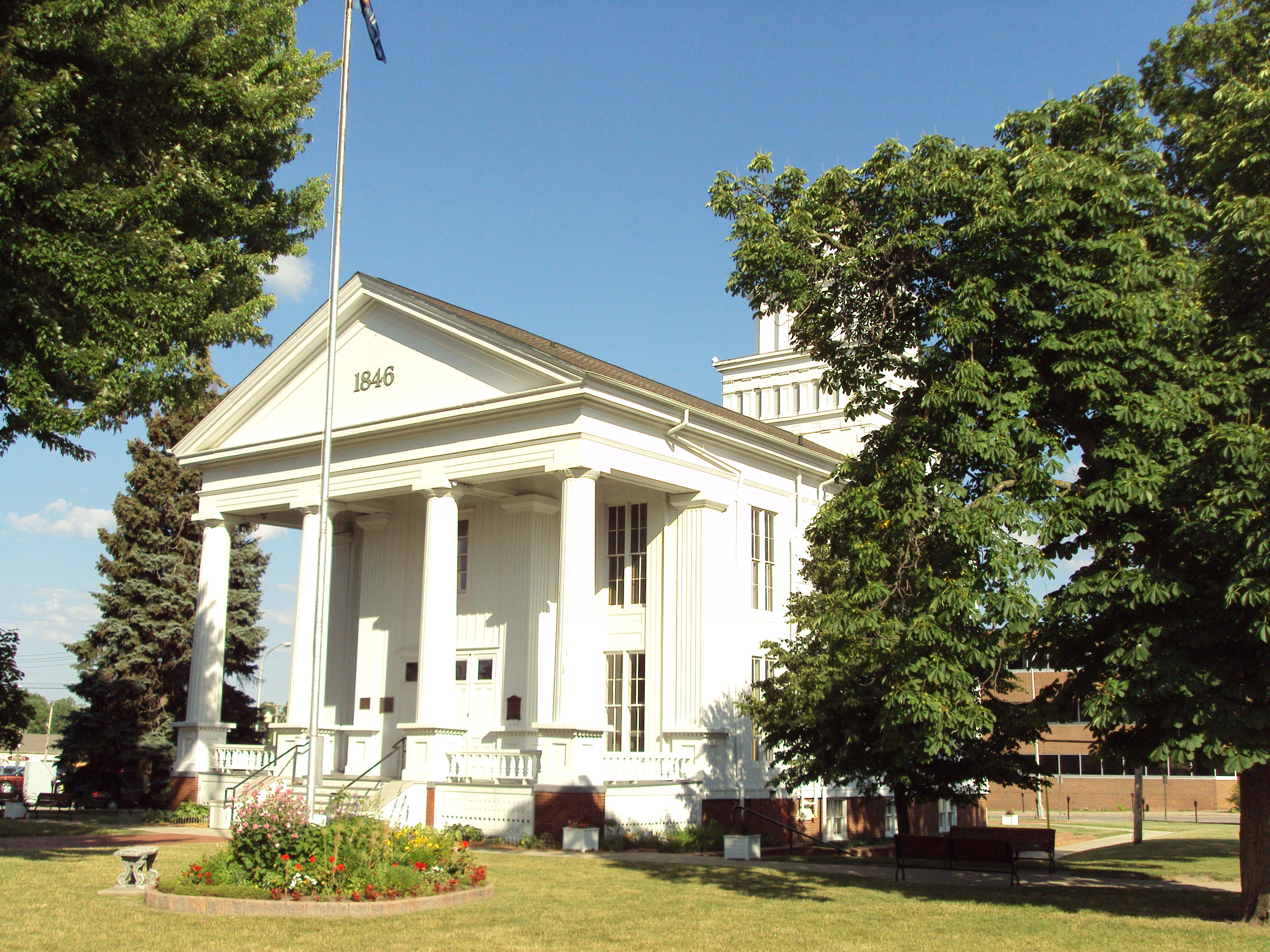
- Lapeer County Courthouse

- Location within the U.S. state of Michigan
- Coordinates: 43°05′N 83°13′W
- Country: United States
- State: Michigan
- Founded: September 18, 1822 (created); February 2, 1835 (organized)
- Seat: Lapeer
- Largest city: Lapeer

Area
  - Total: 663 sq mi (1,720 km^{2})
  - Land: 643 sq mi (1,670 km^{2})
  - Water: 20 sq mi (52 km^{2}) 3.0%

Population (2020)
  - Total: 88,619
  - Estimate (2025): 89,516 ▲
  - Density: 137/sq mi (53/km^{2})
- Time zone: UTC−5 (Eastern)
  - Summer (DST): UTC−4 (EDT)
- Congressional district: 9th
- Website: www.lapeercountymi.gov

Lapeer County (/ləˈpɪər/ lə-PEER) is a county located in the U.S. state of Michigan. As of the 2020 Census, the population was 88,619. The county seat is Lapeer. The county was created on September 18, 1822, and was fully organized on February 2, 1835. The name is a corruption of the French la pierre, which means "the stone". Lapeer County is located north of Detroit and east of Flint.

== History ==
Lapeer County was part of New France from 1534, As, New France gained in population, this area was considered part of the Pays d'en Haut (upper countries) dependency of the Colony of Canada, from its formation as a department of New France in 1712. In 1763 England took possession of all French territory in North America east of the Mississippi River after winning the Seven Years' War. It renamed the colony and its dependencies as the Province of Quebec. France and England had controlled trading with First Nations in this area by establishing forts as a place for gathering and trading, and to settle disputes and enforce laws. They used the ancient overland and waterborne trade routes of the First Nations, while providing superior tools and weapons in exchange for valuable furs.

Following the American Revolution, Great Britain ceded portions of the Province of Quebec to the newly independent United States of America. By an ordinance of the Congress of the United States passed on July 13, 1787, under the Articles of Confederation, the whole of the territory of the United States lying northwest of the Ohio River and east of the Mississippi River, though still occupied by the British, was organized as the Northwest Territory. The area that is now Lapeer County used to be a part of the County of Wayne, named in the honor of General Anthony Wayne. This original Wayne County was created on August 11, 1796; very large, it included all of the lower peninsula of Michigan, parts of Northern Ohio and Indiana, and also portions of Wisconsin and Illinois. As population increased in the area, new counties were organized in this territory.

What is now Lapeer County, on May 7, 1800, was considered part of the Territory of Indiana, which included all of the lower peninsula of Michigan. After Ohio and Indiana became states, the Territory of Michigan was formed. In 1807 local Indian tribes: the Ottawa, Ojibwa (Chippewa), Wyandot and Potawatomi, ceded the land of Southeast Michigan to the United States in the Treaty of Detroit. They had been under pressure for some time, especially as they had been allied with the British in the Revolutionary War. They were encouraged to move west out of the area, but some remained in Michigan.

In January 1820, the County of Oakland was formed. On September 18, 1822, Governor Lewis Cass set Lapeer County's boundaries, although it remained a part of Oakland County until it was organized. Lapeer County officially became a county on February 2, 1835. The first recorded elections for county officers, with 520 people voting, occurred in 1837.

The first European-American settler in Lapeer was Alvin N. Hart, who was born in Cornwall, Connecticut on February 11, 1804. He came to Lapeer in 1831 and platted the Village of Lapeer on November 8, 1833. The plat was registered in Pontiac, December 14, 1833, in Oakland County's Associate Judge Bagley's court. Alvin Hart became a state senator in 1843, representing Lapeer, Oakland, Genesee, Shiawassee, Tuscola, Saginaw counties and the entire Upper Peninsula. He was instrumental in having the state capital moved from Detroit to Lansing.

On March 9, 1843, a column of townships was removed from westernmost Lapeer County and annexed to Genesee County. From north to south, the townships were Forest, Richfield, Davison and Atlas.

Lumber was the principal industry of the Lapeer County area from the 1830s until 1870. Lumber was in demand with development throughout the Midwest. In addition there was the expectation that clearing much of the county's forests would attract farmers as settlers. Lapeer's economy shifted to become primarily agriculturally based.

On October 26, 2010, Lapeer became a founding member of the Karegnondi Water Authority.

=== Historical markers ===
Fifteen historical markers have been installed throughout Lapeer County commemorating sites and structures of interest:

- Columbiaville Depot
- Currier House (Almont)
- Dryden Depot
- General Squier Memorial Park (Dryden Township)
- Grand Trunk Western Railroad Depot / Imlay City
- Grettenberger Field (Imlay City)
- Henry Stephens Memorial Library (Almont)
- Ladies Library Hall (Dryden)
- Lapeer County (at Lapeer County Courthouse)
- Lapeer Public Library
- Pioneer Bank (North Branch)
- St. Patrick's Church (Clifford)
- Tuttle House (Lapeer)
- United Methodist Church (Columbiaville)
- William Peter Mansion (Columbiaville)
- The White Horse Inn (Metamora)

== Geography ==
According to the U.S. Census Bureau, the county has a total area of 663 square miles (1,720 km^{2}), of which 643 square miles (1,670 km^{2}) is land and 20 square miles (52 km^{2}) (3.0%) is water. Lapeer County's geography is very similar to Oakland County, except Lapeer County is more rural. Lapeer is one of the five counties that form the peninsula projecting into Lake Huron known as The Thumb, which in turn is a sub-region of Mid Michigan.

The headwaters of the Flint River are in Columbiaville. It flows through the county toward Genesee. The City of Lapeer straddles it course.

=== Major highways ===
- I-69 runs east and west through the county
- M-24 runs north and south through the western part of the county, including the city of Lapeer
- M-53 runs north and south through the eastern part of the county, including Imlay City
- M-90 runs east and west through the county, including the city of North Branch

=== Adjacent counties ===
- Sanilac County (northeast)
- Tuscola County (northwest)
- St. Clair County (east)
- Genesee County (west)
- Macomb County (southeast)
- Oakland County (southwest)

== Demographics ==
Historical population
Census	Pop.	Note	%±
1840	4,265		—
1850	7,029		64.8%
1860	14,754		109.9%
1870	21,345		44.7%
1880	30,138		41.2%
1890	29,213		−3.1%
1900	27,641		−5.4%
1910	26,033		−5.8%
1920	25,782		−1.0%
1930	28,348		10.0%
1940	32,116		13.3%
1950	35,794		11.5%
1960	41,926		17.1%
1970	52,317		24.8%
1980	70,038		33.9%
1990	74,768		6.8%
2000	87,904		17.6%
2010	88,319		0.5%
2020	88,619		0.3%
2025 (est.)	89,516	▲	1.0%
U.S. Decennial Census; 1790-1960 1900-1990; 1990-2000 2010-2018

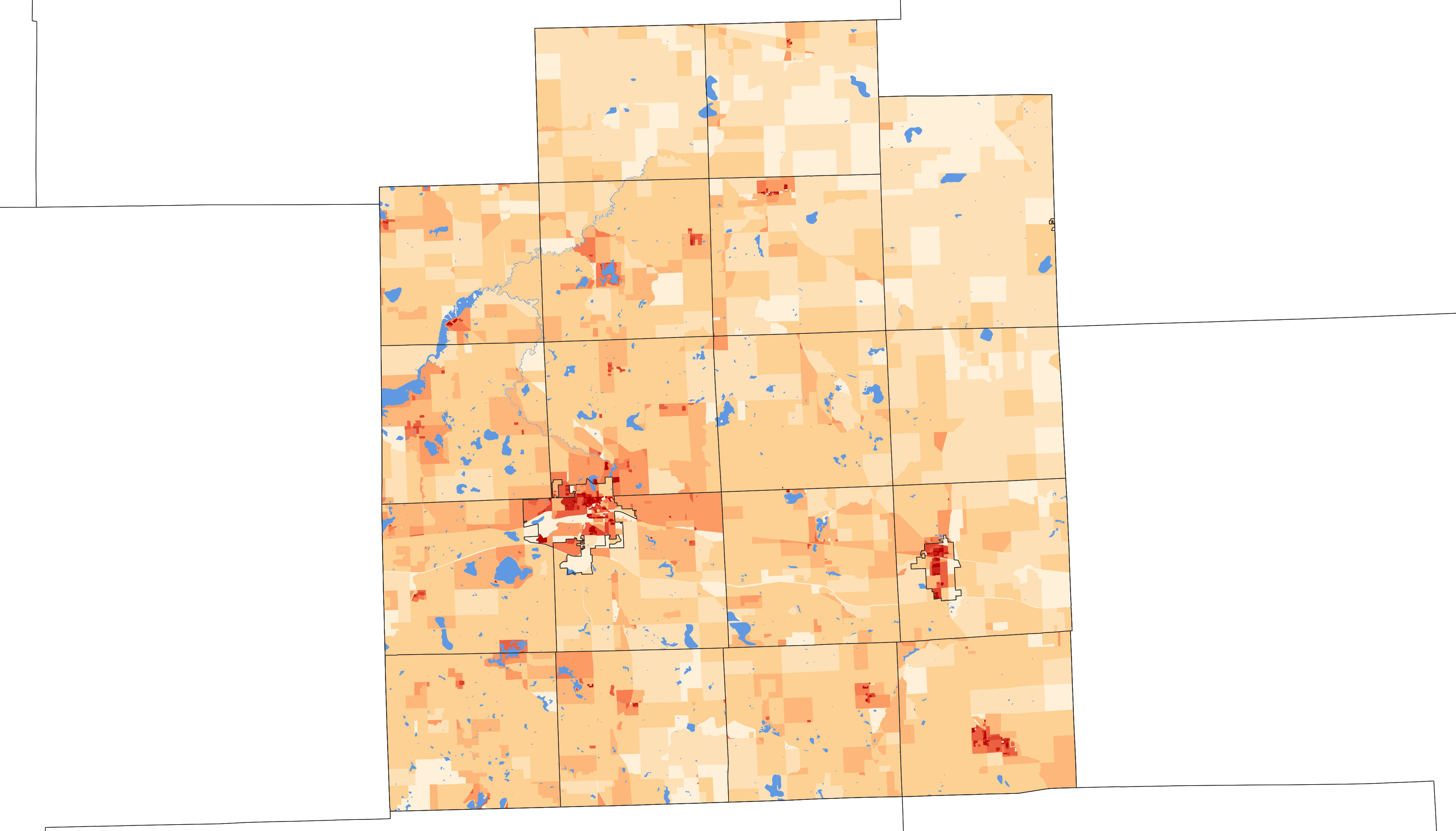
2020 population density of Lapeer County MI by census block

=== Racial and ethnic composition ===
Lapeer County, Michigan – Racial and ethnic composition Note: the US Census treats Hispanic/Latino as an ethnic category. This table excludes Latinos from the racial categories and assigns them to a separate category. Hispanics/Latinos may be of any race.
Race / Ethnicity (NH = Non-Hispanic)	Pop 1980	Pop 1990	Pop 2000	Pop 2010	Pop 2020	% 1980	% 1990	% 2000	% 2010	% 2020
White alone (NH)	68,091	72,225	82,998	82,147	78,871	97.22%	96.60%	94.42%	93.01%	89.00%
Black or African American alone (NH)	156	473	709	896	966	0.22%	0.63%	0.81%	1.01%	1.09%
Native American or Alaska Native alone (NH)	168	307	296	348	277	0.24%	0.41%	0.34%	0.39%	0.31%
Asian alone (NH)	184	262	331	308	396	0.26%	0.35%	0.38%	0.35%	0.45%
Native Hawaiian or Pacific Islander alone (NH)	x	x	6	9	8	x	x	0.01%	0.01%	0.01%
Other race alone (NH)	114	8	31	20	250	0.16%	0.01%	0.04%	0.02%	0.28%
Mixed race or Multiracial (NH)	x	x	802	969	3,607	x	x	0.91%	1.10%	4.07%
Hispanic or Latino (any race)	1,325	1,493	2,731	3,622	4,244	1.89%	2.00%	3.11%	4.10%	4.79%
Total	70,038	74,768	87,904	88,319	88,619	100.00%	100.00%	100.00%	100.00%	100.00%

=== 2020 census ===
As of the 2020 census, the county had a population of 88,619, the median age was 44.4 years, 20.8% of residents were under the age of 18, and 19.2% of residents were 65 years of age or older. For every 100 females there were 103.5 males, and for every 100 females age 18 and over there were 102.7 males age 18 and over.

The racial makeup of the county was 90.6% White, 1.1% Black or African American, 0.4% American Indian and Alaska Native, 0.5% Asian, <0.1% Native Hawaiian and Pacific Islander, 1.7% from some other race, and 5.8% from two or more races. Hispanic or Latino residents of any race comprised 4.8% of the population.

14.1% of residents lived in urban areas, while 85.9% lived in rural areas.

There were 34,256 households in the county, of which 28.3% had children under the age of 18 living in them. Of all households, 55.9% were married-couple households, 17.0% were households with a male householder and no spouse or partner present, and 20.2% were households with a female householder and no spouse or partner present. About 23.9% of all households were made up of individuals and 11.0% had someone living alone who was 65 years of age or older.

There were 36,725 housing units, of which 6.7% were vacant. Among occupied housing units, 83.5% were owner-occupied and 16.5% were renter-occupied. The homeowner vacancy rate was 1.1% and the rental vacancy rate was 5.0%.

=== 2010 census ===
As of the 2010 United States census, there were 88,319 people living in the county. 95.5% were White, 1.0% Black or African American, 0.5% Native American, 0.3% Asian, 1.2% of some other race and 1.4% of two or more races. 4.1% were Hispanic or Latino (of any race). 23.9% were of German, 10.9% English, 10.4% Irish, 8.6% Polish, 7.3% American and 5.2% French, French Canadian or Cajun ancestry.

=== 2000 census ===
As of the 2000 census, there were 87,904 people, 30,729 households, and 23,876 families living in the county. The population density was 134 inhabitants per square mile (52/km^{2}). There were 32,732 housing units at an average density of 50 per square mile (19/km^{2}). The racial makeup of the county was 96.17% White, 0.82% Black or African American, 0.38% Native American, 0.39% Asian, 0.01% Pacific Islander, 1.07% from other races, and 1.16% from two or more races. 3.11% of the population were Hispanic or Latino of any race. 24.2% were of German, 11.8% English, 9.7% American, 9.6% Irish and 9.4% Polish ancestry, 95.9% spoke English and 2.6% Spanish as their first language.

In 2000, there were 30,729 households, of which 38.30% had children under the age of 18 living with them, 65.70% were married couples living together, 8.10% had a female householder with no husband present, and 22.30% were non-families. 18.50% of all households were made up of individuals, and 6.90% had someone living alone who was 65 years of age or older. The average household size was 2.80 and the average family size was 3.19.

Among county residents, 28.00% were under the age of 18, 7.70% from 18 to 24, 31.00% from 25 to 44, 23.80% from 45 to 64, and 9.60% were 65 years of age or older. The median age was 36 years. For every 100 females, there were 102.40 males. For every 100 females age 18 and over, there were 101.10 males.

The median income for a household in the county was $51,717, and the median income for a family was $57,817. Males had a median income of $47,506 versus $26,385 for females. The per capita income for the county was $21,462. About 3.80% of families and 5.40% of the population lived below the poverty line, including 5.70% of those under age 18 and 7.50% of those age 65 or over.

== Government ==
United States presidential election results for Lapeer County, Michigan
Year	Republican		Democratic		Third party(ies)	
Year	No.	%	No.	%	No.	%
1884	3,062	50.15%	2,741	44.89%	303	4.96%
1888	3,662	53.36%	2,914	42.46%	287	4.18%
1892	3,126	49.11%	2,698	42.39%	541	8.50%
1896	3,809	53.63%	3,065	43.15%	229	3.22%
1900	3,706	59.71%	2,208	35.57%	293	4.72%
1904	3,917	68.96%	1,519	26.74%	244	4.30%
1908	3,426	63.49%	1,644	30.47%	326	6.04%
1912	1,728	32.09%	1,200	22.28%	2,457	45.63%
1916	3,345	61.77%	1,937	35.77%	133	2.46%
1920	5,523	78.61%	1,298	18.47%	205	2.92%
1924	6,297	83.65%	929	12.34%	302	4.01%
1928	6,514	82.80%	1,312	16.68%	41	0.52%
1932	4,882	51.87%	4,315	45.85%	215	2.28%
1936	5,081	54.26%	3,868	41.31%	415	4.43%
1940	7,714	69.85%	3,299	29.87%	31	0.28%
1944	7,769	71.80%	3,002	27.74%	50	0.46%
1948	8,358	62.85%	4,668	35.10%	272	2.05%
1952	9,940	72.79%	3,644	26.68%	72	0.53%
1956	10,527	72.81%	3,913	27.06%	19	0.13%
1960	10,450	67.13%	5,099	32.76%	18	0.12%
1964	6,012	41.11%	8,595	58.77%	17	0.12%
1968	8,866	54.85%	5,199	32.17%	2,098	12.98%
1972	11,615	66.02%	5,531	31.44%	446	2.54%
1976	12,349	55.59%	9,503	42.78%	363	1.63%
1980	15,996	56.99%	9,671	34.45%	2,402	8.56%
1984	19,222	70.67%	7,800	28.68%	178	0.65%
1988	16,670	60.19%	10,736	38.76%	291	1.05%
1992	12,326	35.13%	11,982	34.15%	10,776	30.71%
1996	13,369	40.71%	14,308	43.57%	5,164	15.72%
2000	20,351	54.66%	15,749	42.30%	1,134	3.05%
2004	25,556	57.89%	18,086	40.97%	505	1.14%
2008	22,831	50.33%	21,457	47.30%	1,074	2.37%
2012	23,734	55.05%	18,796	43.60%	585	1.36%
2016	30,037	66.48%	12,734	28.18%	2,412	5.34%
2020	35,482	67.29%	16,367	31.04%	883	1.67%
2024	38,398	69.26%	16,338	29.47%	703	1.27%

United States Senate election results for Lapeer County, Michigan1
Year	Republican		Democratic		Third party(ies)	
Year	No.	%	No.	%	No.	%
2024	36,578	66.93%	16,651	30.47%	1,426	2.61%

Michigan Gubernatorial election results for Lapeer County
Year	Republican		Democratic		Third party(ies)	
Year	No.	%	No.	%	No.	%
2022	26,940	61.50%	15,983	36.49%	879	2.01%

The county government operates the jail, maintains rural roads, operates the major local courts, keeps files of deeds and mortgages, maintains vital records, administers public health regulations, runs county parks, and participates with the state in the provision of welfare and other social services. The county board of commissioners controls the budget but has only limited authority to make laws or ordinances. In Michigan, most local government functions — police and fire, building and zoning, tax assessment, street maintenance, etc. — are the responsibility of individual cities, villages, and townships.

=== Elected officials (2022) ===
- Prosecuting Attorney: John Miller
- Sheriff: Scott McKenna
- County Clerk: Theresa M. Spencer
- County Treasurer: Dana M. Miller
- Register of Deeds: Amy R. Stearns
- Drain Commissioner: Joseph E. Suma
- County Surveyor: Richard A. Duthler, P.S.

=== Board of Commissioners ===
7 members, elected from districts (1 Democrat, 6 Republicans)

District	Commissioner	Party	District's Area
1	Cheryl Clark (Vice-chairman)	Democratic	Townships of Marathon, Oregon and portion of Elba
2	Dyle Henning	Republican	Townships of Rich, Deerfield and portion of Mayfield
3	Gary Roy (chairman)	Republican	Townships of Arcadia, Burlington, Burnside, Goodland and North Branch
4	Lenny Schneider	Republican	City of Lapeer and portions of Lapeer and Mayfield Townships
5	Dave Eady	Republican	Townships of Hadley, Metamora and portion of Elba
6	Linda Jarvis	Republican	Townships of Attica, Dryden and portion of Lapeer
7	Ian Kempf	Republican	Imlay City and Townships of Almont and Imlay

== Communities ==
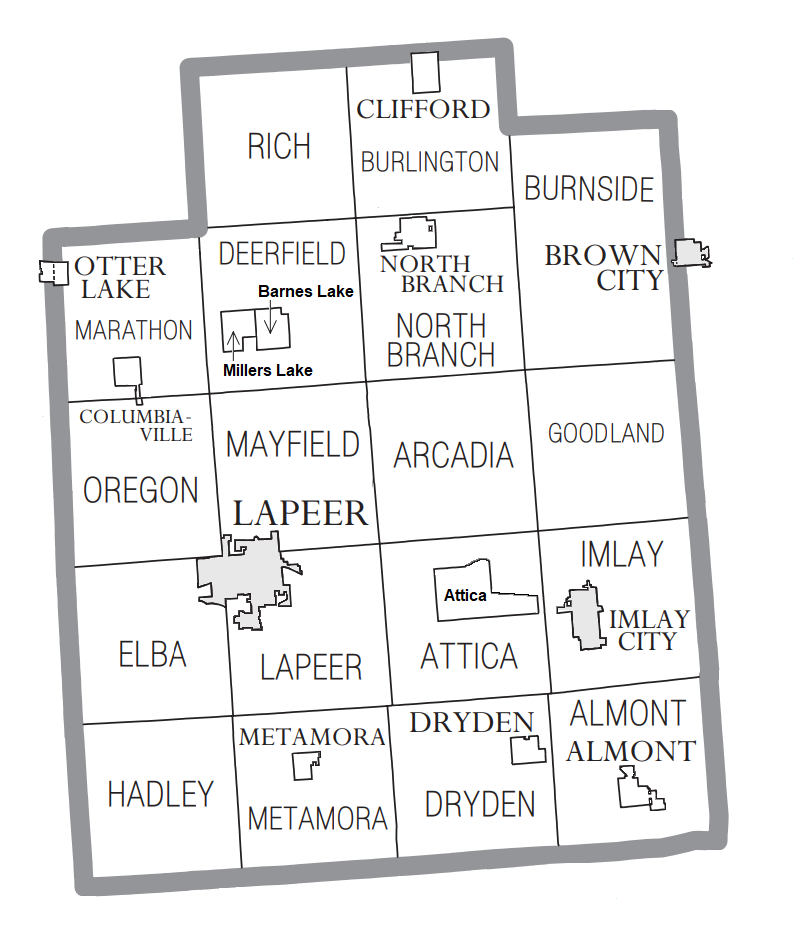
U.S. Census data map showing local municipal boundaries within Lapeer County, as well as CDP boundaries. Shaded areas represent incorporated cities.

=== Cities ===
- Brown City (mostly in Sanilac County)
- Imlay City
- Lapeer (county seat)

=== Villages ===
- Almont
- Clifford
- Columbiaville
- Dryden
- Metamora
- North Branch
- Otter Lake (partly in Genesee County)

=== Civil townships ===
- Almont Township
- Arcadia Township
- Attica Township
- Burlington Township
- Burnside Township
- Deerfield Township
- Dryden Township
- Elba Township
- Goodland Township
- Hadley Township
- Imlay Township
- Lapeer Township
- Marathon Township
- Mayfield Township
- Metamora Township
- North Branch Township
- Oregon Township
- Rich Township

=== Census-designated places ===
- Attica
- Barnes Lake
- Barnes Lake–Millers Lake (former)
- Millers Lake

=== Other unincorporated communities ===
- Burnside
- Elba
- Farmers Creek
- Five Lakes
- Goodland
- Hadley
- Hunters Creek
- Kerr Hill
- Kings Mill
- Lum
- Silverwood
- Thornville

== See also ==
- List of Michigan State Historic Sites in Lapeer County
- National Register of Historic Places listings in Lapeer County, Michigan
