= Mayfield Township, Lapeer County, Michigan =

Mayfield Township, Michigan
- Civil township
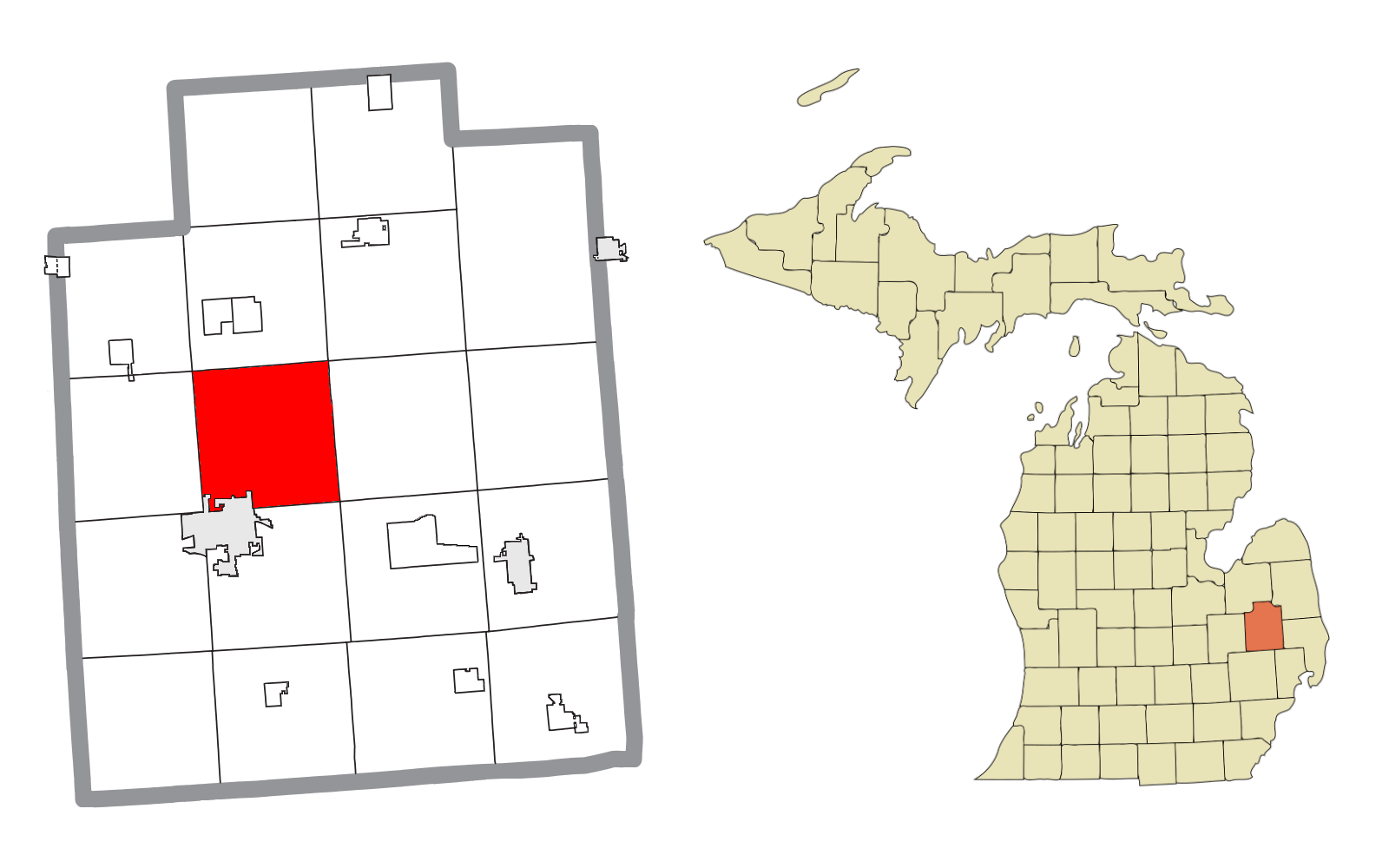
- Location within Lapeer County

- Location within the state of Michigan Location within the United States
- Coordinates: 43°05′34″N 83°17′17″W
- Country: United States
- State: Michigan
- County: Lapeer

Government
  - Type: Michigan Municipal Corporation
  - Supervisor: Terry Jostock

Area
  - Total: 35.1 sq mi (90.8 km^{2})
  - Land: 34.8 sq mi (90.1 km^{2})
  - Water: 0.27 sq mi (0.7 km^{2})
- Elevation: 827 ft (252 m)

Population (2020)
  - Total: 7,988
  - Density: 230/sq mi (88.7/km^{2})
- Time zone: UTC-5 (Eastern (EST))
  - Summer (DST): UTC-4 (EDT)
- FIPS code: 26-52500
- GNIS feature ID: 1626713
- Website: www.mayfieldtownship.com

Mayfield Township is a civil township of Lapeer County in the U.S. state of Michigan. The population was 7,988 at the 2020 Census.

== History ==
Mayfield Township was first organized in 1843 when John B. Evans, John Ryan and Martin Stiles gave notice to the township's inhabitants that a town meeting would be held on April 17 at the school near Stiles' home. 34 freeholders met that day, elected the township's first officers, and voted to raise $125 to pay expenses and establish a burial ground. The cemetery was later named after Stiles.

Six years after it was organized, Mayfield Township was attached to Lapeer Township in a move by the state legislature. That arrangement continued until March 13, 1869, when the township was reorganized.

In the years following, the lumber industry grew and by 1874, there were ten saw mills operating in Mayfield Township. The success of the lumber industry resulted in three thriving villages within the township: Fish Lake, Five Lakes and Millville. As land was cleared of its trees, it was sold to individuals for homesteads and farms. By 1884, the village of Fish Lake was abandoned. The census of that year reported no saw, shingle, or lathe mills still operating.

Much of the former prime lumbering lands in the township were bought by the Michigan Department of Conservation in 1944. The Michigan State Game Area comprises much of the land once owned by Mayfield Township's early settlers.

Besides the mills at Millville, the township's longest running business may have been the Callis brick making plant. William Callis moved to Mayfield in the mid-1850s. The plant on the family homestead was built about that time and operated for many years. The home Callis built for his son, William Elmer, at the corner of Callis and Davis Lake Roads still stands.

Mayfield Township has also been home to two of the most successful manufacturing businesses in Lapeer County's history. In 1962, Vesely's Apache camping trailer was named Michigan's Consumer Product of the Year. At one time, the plant was the world's largest camping trailer factory, producing up to 2,000 per month. Next, the plant was home to Durakon Industries, which manufactured pickup truck bedliners.

Two historical sites in the township recognized with special markers from the Lapeer County Historical Society are the former villages of Millville and Fish Lake.

== Government ==
Supervisor- Dan Engelman

Clerk- Julie Schlaud

Treasurer- Dan Frisch

Trustee- Cheryl Kile

Trustee- Chris Maasch

== Geography ==
According to the United States Census Bureau, the township has a total area of 35.1 square miles (90.8 km^{2}), of which 34.8 square miles (90.1 km^{2}) is land and 0.3 square mile (0.7 km^{2}) (0.80%) is water.

== Demographics ==
As of the census of 2000, there were 7,659 people, 2,685 households, and 2,107 families residing in the township. The population density was 220.2 inhabitants per square mile (85.0/km^{2}). There were 2,774 housing units at an average density of 79.8 per square mile (30.8/km^{2}). The racial makeup of the township was 97.43% White, 0.25% African American, 0.30% Native American, 0.39% Asian, 0.03% Pacific Islander, 0.38% from other races, and 1.23% from two or more races. Hispanic or Latino of any race were 1.72% of the population.

There were 2,685 households, out of which 38.8% had children under the age of 18 living with them, 67.1% were married couples living together, 8.1% had a female householder with no husband present, and 21.5% were non-families. 17.4% of all households were made up of individuals, and 6.6% had someone living alone who was 65 years of age or older. The average household size was 2.79 and the average family size was 3.15.

In the township the population was spread out, with 27.4% under the age of 18, 7.4% from 18 to 24, 29.0% from 25 to 44, 24.4% from 45 to 64, and 11.8% who were 65 years of age or older. The median age was 37 years. For every 100 females, there were 96.8 males. For every 100 females age 18 and over, there were 92.9 males.

The median income for a household in the township was $50,822, and the median income for a family was $54,827. Males had a median income of $48,494 versus $26,381 for females. The per capita income for the township was $20,399. About 3.7% of families and 4.7% of the population were below the poverty line, including 5.2% of those under age 18 and 7.0% of those age 65 or over.
