= National Register of Historic Places listings in Lapeer County, Michigan =

Location of Lapeer County in Michigan

The following is a list of National Register of Historic Places listings in Lapeer County, Michigan. Lapeer County was founded in 1822 and has a current estimated population of almost 90,000. It is officially listed as part of Metro Detroit with Lapeer as a county seat.

The county currently contains 24 properties listed on the National Register of Historic Places. All 24 of these sites are also listed as Michigan State Historic Sites, in which the county contains 43 such state listed properties. The listings on the National Register include 15 houses, four historic districts, one former train station, former courthouse, a bank, a mill, and the restricted Younge Site. The Warren Perry house has since been moved from its original location. The city of Lapeer has the most listings with 13.

This National Park Service list is complete through NPS recent listings posted October 30, 2026.

== Current listings ==
	Name on the Register	Image	Date listed	Location	City or town	Description
1	Joseph Armstrong House	Joseph Armstrong House	July 26, 1985 (#85001625)	707 Monroe Street; 43°03′20″N 83°18′58″W	Lapeer	Built in 1887–1888, the 2½-story house was built for prominent local businessman Joseph Armstrong, who operated a dry goods store in Lapeer for 37 years. The house has undergone few alterations since its original construction.
2	Currier House	Currier House	June 10, 1975 (#75000950)	231 East Saint Clair Street; 42°55′15″N 83°02′31″W	Almont	Built in 1854, this octagon house was built by Frederick Currey, who was a prominent businessman in Lapeer County. The front, rear, and side walls are 24 feet (7.3 m) long, and the four diagonal walls are six feet (1.8 m) in length.
3	John W. Day House	John W. Day House	December 17, 1987 (#87002153)	4985 Dryden Road; 42°56′44″N 83°08′43″W	Dryden Township	Built in 1863, the structure is a wood framed, two-story Greek Revival house built for farmer John W. Day and later purchased by Augustus Dittman in 1870. The house has undergone a few additions, including the entire right side wing in 1880.
4	Detroit–Bay City Railroad Company Columbiaville Depot	Detroit–Bay City Railroad Company Columbiaville Depot	April 5, 1984 (#84001785)	4643 First Street; 43°09′22″N 83°24′32″W	Columbiaville	The former train station functioned from 1893 to 1964 and was a prominent stopover to and from Detroit and Bay City. It was built by William Peter, who platted Columbiaville in 1871. Decommissioned in 1964, the railway itself ceased operation in 1977.
5	Dryden Community Country Club–General Squier Historic Park Complex	Dryden Community Country Club–General Squier Historic Park Complex	June 5, 1986 (#86001220)	4725 South Mill Road; 42°55′33″N 83°07′27″W	Dryden Township	Comprising 80 acres (33 ha), the oldest structure on the site is a mill dating to 1871. The complex, which also contains a water park and several other structures, served as the summer residence of George Owen Squier who later converted his property into a county park.
6	James B. Dutton House	James B. Dutton House	July 26, 1985 (#85001626)	605 Calhoun Street; 43°03′18″N 83°18′54″W	Lapeer	
7	James F. Fairweather–Jacob C. Lamb House	James F. Fairweather–Jacob C. Lamb House	September 26, 1985 (#85002494)	540 South Almont Avenue; 43°01′07″N 83°04′39″W	Imlay City	
8	Hadley Flour and Feed Mill	Hadley Flour and Feed Mill	September 25, 1986 (#86002770)	3633 Hadley Road; 42°57′03″N 83°24′11″W	Hadley Township	The site includes several structures, but the main building is a 2½ story wooden gristmill constructed in 1874. The site ceased operation in 1964 and was later converted to a museum known as the Hadley Mill Museum that was donated to the township in 2002.
9	Rodney G. Hart House	Rodney G. Hart House	July 26, 1985 (#85001627)	326 West Park Street; 43°03′19″N 83°18′44″W	Lapeer	
10	John and Julia Hevener House	John and Julia Hevener House	July 26, 1985 (#85001628)	1444 West Genesee Street; 43°03′03″N 83°19′22″W	Lapeer	
11	Lapeer County Courthouse	Lapeer County Courthouse	September 3, 1971 (#71000402)	Courthouse Square, West Nepessing Street; 43°03′14″N 83°18′39″W	Lapeer	Completed in 1846, the Greek Revival courthouse is recognized as the oldest original courthouse still in use in the state of Michigan and one of the 10 oldest such structures in all of the country. It has remained largely unaltered since it was built and continues to serve the county.
12	John and Rosetta Lee House	John and Rosetta Lee House	July 26, 1985 (#85001629)	823 Calhoun Street; 43°03′25″N 83°18′55″W	Lapeer	Built in 1872, it is one of the few Gothic Revival houses in Lapeer. At some point, it was converted from a single dwelling into an apartment house, which was the biggest structural change to the building, but most of the exterior has remained the same.
13	Metamora Crossroads Historic District	Metamora Crossroads Historic District	July 19, 1984 (#84001790)	Intersection of Oak and High Street; 42°56′30″N 83°17′20″W	Metamora	Consisting of 15 buildings dating from 1850 to 1910, the 3.5 acre (1.4 ha) district centers on Oak and High Street in the village of Metamora, which dates back to 1838. Development of this core area ceased prior to World War I, preserving the early architecture.
14	Charles Palmer House	Charles Palmer House	June 12, 1987 (#87000916)	240 North Main Street; 43°01′34″N 83°04′28″W	Imlay City	
15	Warren Perry House	Warren Perry House	July 26, 1985 (#85001630)	1497 West Genesee Street; 43°03′01″N 83°19′24″W	Lapeer	The Warren Perry house was originally located at 892 Saginaw Street, but some time after listing on the Register was moved to its present location at 1497 W. Genesee Street.
16	Piety Hill Historic District	Piety Hill Historic District	July 26, 1985 (#85001631)	Bounded by Park, Calhoun, Nepressing, Cramton, and Main; 43°03′09″N 83°19′00″W	Lapeer	As the center of Lapeer's early religious gatherings and the oldest platted section of the city, it includes five different church structures dating from 1881 to 1911. The majority of properties in the district are single-family dwellings dating from 1830 to 1850.
17	Pioneer State Bank No. 36	Pioneer State Bank No. 36	April 22, 1982 (#82002846)	4046 Huron Street; 43°13′45″N 83°11′36″W	North Branch	Built in 1906, the building is the oldest bank institution in North Branch. Founded in 1885 as a state bank and reorganized in 1889, the present site was purchased for a new building in 1903. The structure continues to operate as an independent bank.
18	Samuel J. Tomlinson House	Samuel J. Tomlinson House	July 26, 1985 (#85001632)	841 Calhoun Street; 43°03′26″N 83°18′55″W	Lapeer	
19	Columbus Tuttle House	Columbus Tuttle House	July 26, 1985 (#85001633)	610 North Main Street; 43°03′18″N 83°19′07″W	Lapeer	
20	Peter Van Dyke House	Peter Van Dyke House	July 26, 1985 (#85001634)	1091 Pine Street; 43°03′34″N 83°18′44″W	Lapeer	
21	William H. and Sabrina Watson House	William H. and Sabrina Watson House	July 26, 1985 (#85001635)	507 Cedar Street; 43°03′18″N 83°18′45″W	Lapeer	
22	West Saint Clair Street Historic District	West Saint Clair Street Historic District	May 8, 1986 (#86000998)	124–328 West St. Clair Street; 42°55′14″N 83°02′52″W	Almont	Consisting of 15 houses located along a single stretch of West Saint Clair Street, the district also contains the Henry Stephens Memorial Library, which is a contributing property that was listed in its own right as a Michigan State Historic Site on May 16, 1991.
23	Jay White House	Jay White House	July 26, 1985 (#85001636)	1109 West Genesee Street; 43°03′02″N 83°19′14″W	Lapeer	
24	Younge Site	Younge Site	October 29, 1976 (#76002161)	Address Restricted; 43°08′40″N 83°03′30″W	Goodland Township	The Younge Site contains two wooden structures and a burial site presumed to belong to Native Americans in the 1600s. Archaeologists discovered unusual burying practices in the exhumed remains, including the drilling of the skulls and other bone modifications prior to burial.

== See also ==
- List of Michigan State Historic Sites in Lapeer County, Michigan
- National Register of Historic Places listings in Michigan
- Listings in neighboring counties: Genesee, Macomb, Oakland, St. Clair, Sanilac, Tuscola
