= List of Michigan State Historic Sites in Lapeer County =

Location of Lapeer County in Michigan

The following is a list of Michigan State Historic Sites in Lapeer County, Michigan. Sites marked with a dagger (†) are also listed on the National Register of Historic Places in Lapeer County, Michigan.

== Current listings ==
Name	Image	Location	City	Listing date
Briggs Carding Mill		622 South Main Street	Almont	March 19, 1987
Christ Evangelical Lutheran Church		5245 South Hadley Road	Hadley Township	July 26, 1978
Clifford School		Northeast corner of Main and Huron Streets	Clifford	October 23, 1979
Columbiaville Methodist Episcopal Church		4696 Pine Street	Columbiaville	May 8, 1984
F. P. Currier House†		231 East St. Clair Street	Almont	April 5, 1975
John W. Day House†		4985 Dryden Road	Dryden vicinity	September 26, 1987
Detroit–Bay City Railroad Company Columbiaville Depot†		4643 First Street	Columbiaville	October 23, 1979
General Squier Park†		4725 South Mill Road	Dryden	June 6, 1977
Dryden Ladies Library Association Hall		5480 Main Street	Dryden	June 15, 1979
James F. Fairweather-Jacob C. Lamb House†		540 South Almont Avenue	Imlay City	September 17, 1981
Fairweather-Fritch Farm		2100 South Fairground Road	Imlay City	April 29, 1982
First Congregational Church of Almont		201 St. Clair	Almont	April 17, 1997
Grand Trunk Railroad Company Depot		77 Main Street	Imlay City	February 27, 1980
Grand Trunk Railroad Depot		Railroad Street, north of Main Street	Dryden	August 6, 1976
Robert Kerr House		5554 Hadley Road	Goodrich	June 15, 1979
Lapeer County Courthouse†		Courthouse Square, West Nepessing Street	Lapeer	September 17, 1957
Lapeer Public Library		921 West Nepessing Street	Lapeer	July 15, 1999
Richard Murphy-Walter Walker House		430 South Almont Avenue	Imlay City	February 19, 1981
Charles Palmer House†		240 North Main Street	Imlay City	March 18, 1982
William Peter Mansion		4707 Water Street	Columbiaville	October 23, 1979
Pioneer State Bank No. 36†		4046 Huron Street	North Branch	October 23, 1979
George Price-Norman Blood House		4687 Blood Road	Metamora	March 19, 1987
Governor John T. Rich House		707 North Calhoun Street	Lapeer	March 15, 1990
Saint Patrick Roman Catholic Church	St. Patrick Chapel-Clifford	9951 Main Street	Clifford	April 20, 1989
Henry Stephens Memorial Library		213 West St. Clair	Almont	May 16, 1991
Samuel J. Tomlinson House†		841 Calhoun Street	Lapeer	March 16, 1995
The Tuttle House†		610 North Main Street	Lapeer	2008
Hiram C. Wells House		270 North Almont Avenue	Imlay City	September 16, 1986
E.T. White House		237 North Main Street	Lapeer	February 11, 1972
Younge Site (20LP3)		Address Restricted: NE Lapeer County	Goodland vicinity	October 29, 1971

== See also ==
- National Register of Historic Places listings in Lapeer County, Michigan

== Sources ==
- Historic Sites Online – Lapeer County. Michigan State Housing Developmental Authority. Accessed March 13, 2011.
