= Day House =

Day House may refer to:

- Judge William T. Day House, Casa Grande, AZ, listed on the NRHP in Arizona
- Day House (Prescott, Arizona), listed on the NRHP in Yavapai County, Arizona
- Calvin Day House, Hartford, CT, listed on the NRHP in Connecticut
- Day House (Hartford, Connecticut), listed on the NRHP in Connecticut
- Day-Taylor House, Hartford, CT, listed on the NRHP in Connecticut
- Amasa Day House, Moodus, CT, listed on the NRHP in Connecticut
- Ivan W. Day House, Stanley, ID, listed on the NRHP in Idaho
- Holman Day House, Auburn, ME, listed on the NRHP in Maine
- Anna Day House, Cambridge, MA, listed on the NRHP in Massachusetts
- Fred Holland Day House, Norwood, MA, listed on the NRHP in Massachusetts
- Josiah Day House, West Springfield, MA, listed on the NRHP in Massachusetts
- C. C. Day House, Aberdeen, MS, listed on the NRHP in Mississippi
- Day House (Springfield, Missouri), listed on the NRHP in Missouri
- John W. Day House, Dryden, MI, listed on the NRHP in Michigan
- Erastus Day House, Lakewood, OH, listed on the NRHP in Ohio
- Edwin and Hattie Day House, Ballinger, TX, listed on the NRHP in Texas
- Day-Vandevander Mill, Harmon, WV, listed on the NRHP in West Virginia
- Isham Day House, Mequon, WI, listed on the NRHP in Wisconsin
- Dr. Fisk Holbrook Day House, Wauwatosa, WI, listed on the NRHP in Wisconsin
