= John and Rosetta Lee House =

Historic house in Michigan, United States

- U.S. National Register of Historic Places
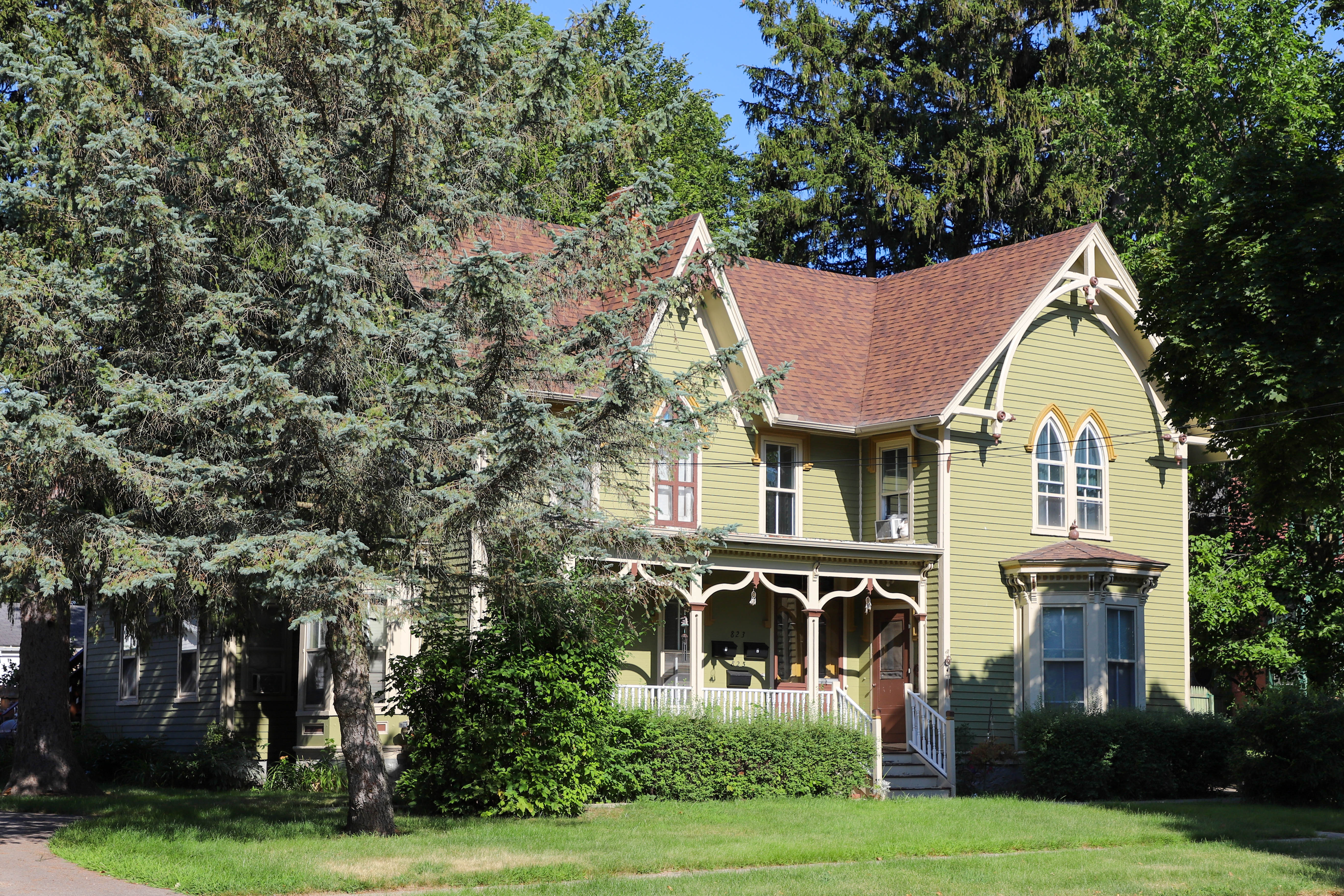
- John and Rosetta Lee House, Lapeer, Michigan.

- Location within Michigan Location within the United States
- Interactive map
- Location: 823 Calhoun Street; Lapeer, Michigan
- Coordinates: 43°03′25″N 83°18′55″W
- Built: 1872
- Architectural style: Gothic Revival
- MPS: Lapeer MRA
- NRHP reference No.: 85001629
- Added to NRHP: July 26, 1985

The John and Rosetta Lee House is a private residential structure located at 823 Calhoun Street in the city of Lapeer in Lapeer County, Michigan. It was added to the National Register of Historic Places on July 26, 1985.

== History ==
In 1870, John and Rosetta Lee purchased the property. In 1872, they built one of the few Gothic Revival houses in Lapeer, This was during the time when the introduction of the railroads spurred development. It was purchased in 1908 by Christopher England, a Piety Hill minister. At some point, it was converted from a single dwelling into an apartment house, which was the biggest structural change to the building, but most of the exterior has remained the same. The John and Rosetta Lee House is located right next door to the Samuel J. Tomlinson House, built in 1880, and within blocks of several other properties of Lapeer also listed on the National Register of Historic Places.

== Description ==
This two-story L-shaped Gothic Revival house has an elaborate front porch with channeled columns and ogee shaped braces in the three bays. It has a steep gable roof with trussing and verge-boards within the gable ends. Two first-floor bay windows are topped with bracketry. The windows are Gothic in character, with lancet shapes. The front entrance is through paired front doors with a colored glass transom above. An addition including a kitchen is attached to the rear of the house.
