= Riviere au Vase site =

Archaeological site in Michigan, United States

Riviere au Vase Site
- Location in Michigan Location in United States
- 42°38′00″N 82°50′00″W
- Location: Riviere au Vase near Lake St. Clair

Site notes
- Area: 3 acres (1.2 ha)

The Riviere au Vase Site (20MB3) is located in Chesterfield Township, Macomb County, in southeastern Michigan. The site is on the Riviere au Vase near where it empties into Lake St. Clair. It is classified as a prehistoric, Late Woodland site.

== History of archaeological investigations ==
The site was excavated under the auspices of the University of Michigan in 1936 and 1937. Emerson Greenman and George Quimby supervised the excavations. In 1945, Greenman and Victoria Harper each authored articles describing some of the artifacts. Twenty years later, James Fitting did a pottery typology and Late Woodland cultural chronology for southeast Michigan based on findings at Riviere au Vase and other sites.

== Results of 1936–1937 excavations ==
Excavations at the site yielded prehistoric artifacts, pit features, burials and animal bone.

=== Features ===
A total of 144 pits were identified at the site. Some of these had animal bone and artifacts such as pot sherds within their fill, and can be classified as refuse pits.

=== Burials ===
A total of 145 burial groupings were identified at the site, representing 350 individuals. Several of the groupings were interpreted to be ossuaries. Some of the burials had extra skulls interred with them; Fitting interpreted these as trophy skulls of warriors, who were buried with honor wearing belts containing the skull of enemies they had vanquished.

=== Animal remains ===
Remains from several species were found in the pits or in the topsoil. The main species present were beaver, deer, dog and fishbones. These remains were not modified into tools like the bone tools described in the Artifacts section below, and may be considered food remains.

=== Artifacts ===
Reconstructed Wayne cordmarked vessel

Partially reconstructed vessel of Wayne smoothed variant of Wayne cordmarked

Rim sherds of Vase Dentate

Rim sherds of Vase Tool-impressed

Macomb Linear corded vessel

Artifacts recovered from the site included:

- Pottery – over 400 rim sherds representing 371 distinct vessels.
- Stone tools – including projectile points, scrapers, drills and perforators. It was suggested that the stone and bone tools were underrepresented at Riviere au Vase when compared to the amount of pottery present. There were 38 projectile points found at the site; the most numerous category was the triangular Levanna point (15) and the second most numerous were the smaller triangular Madison point (8). These types of points, also known as "arrowheads", are thought to be arrow-tips for bows-and-arrows. The usage of the bow-and-arrow seems to have greatly increased during the Late Woodland, probably as a result of increased conflict. The Levanna points were more common from c. A.D. 900 – A.D. 1350 and afterwards the Madison points are more prevalent. The predominance of Levanna points at Riviere au Vase implies the site has an early time placement within the Late Woodland period.
- Ground stone artifacts – including celts, adzes, abraders and gorgets.
- Bone tools – there were 5 awls and a perforated turtle carapace. In addition, 9 turkey tarsometatarsus were found inside a burial.
- Clay effigy – there was a fragmentary effigy of a small animal, found in a burial with a child's skull.

=== Late Woodland pottery ===
Archaeologists often find pottery to be a very useful tool in analyzing a prehistoric culture. It is usually very plentiful at a site and the details of manufacture and decoration are very sensitive indicators of time, space and culture.

There were some whole or completely reconstructable vessels were found at the site, which aided in the analysis. The researchers also looked at rim sherds and distinctive body sherds to further analyze the pottery.

Two Late Woodland ware groups were identified in Fitting's typology: Wayne ward and Riviere ward.

==== Wayne ware ====
53 vessels of Wayne ward were recovered. Wayne ward is characterized by globular to slightly elongated vessels with constricted neck and outflared rims; grit-tempered with fine to medium grains; rims are plain and rarely decorated; and almost never castellated or collared. Surface finish is generally cordmarked. This type is similar to the "generalized woodland" or generic grit-tempered cordmarked vessels typical of the transition from Middle Woodland to Late Woodland.

Fitting's typology only recognized a single type under the category Wayne ward: Wayne Cordmarked, with two variants: Wayne Smoothed (the area from the shoulder to the rim is smoothed) and Wayne Punctate (punctate decorations are applied to the rim).

==== Riviere ware ====
272 vessels of Riviere ward were recovered. Riviere ward differs from Wayne ward in that rims are more likely to be castellated or collared. Also, although both wares are grit-tempered, the Riviere ward has coarser temper particles, while Wayne ward vessels have fine to medium-sized grains.

Four types were defined within Riviere ward:

- Vase Dentate – 83 vessels identified at the Riviere au Vase Site. Characterized by large globular vessels with cordmarked or fabric-wrapped paddle impressed surface finish; decorated with oblique, vertical or herringbone impressions along the rim, made with a dentate stamp or comb. Collared rims are common, but castellations are rare; lip top is flat and slopes outward and the rim profile is vertical to slightly excurved. This type was also present at the Younge site in Lapeer County, Michigan.
- Vase Tool-impressed – 69 vessels identified at the Riviere au Vase Site. Similar to Vase Dentate except castellations are more common. Form is rounded to semiconoidal. This type was also present at the Younge site and the Fort Wayne Mound site just south of Detroit, Michigan.
- Vase Corded – 78 vessels identified at the Riviere au Vase Site. Similar to Vase Dentate and Vase Tool-impressed except the vessel form is more elongated and rims are mostly castellated, and sometimes also collared. Also found at the Younge and Fort Wayne Mound sites and also the Wolf site, which is located about 4 miles northeast of Riviere au Vase.
- Macomb Linear – 8 vessels identified at the Riviere au Vase Site. Characterized by elongated vessels with rounded to semiconoidal bases; constricted necks and slightly excurved rim profiles; castellated rims which are sometimes collared; and roughened or smoothed over cordmarked or fabric-impressed surface. Design motifs include horizontal impressions and triangles forming lines parallel to the base of the collar, or following the castellations. This type was also present at the Younge, Fort Wayne Mound and Wolf sites.

=== Riviere au Vase within the Younge tradition ===
Fitting developed the concept of the Younge tradition (also known as the Western Basin) to interpret a long occupational sequence in southeast Michigan and the western Lake Erie basin that some believe goes from as far back as the late Archaic Period (c. B.C. 3000) and extending to the Late Woodland Period (c. A.D. 1400).

The Late Woodland portion of the sequence is as follows: Riviere Au Vase phase (c. A.D. 600–900), Younge phase (c. A.D. 900–1100), the Springwells phase (c. A.D. 1100–1350) and the Wolf phase (after c. A.D. 1250).

The Younge phase, as well as the Younge tradition, is named after the Younge site, which is the first site where pottery of this tradition was excavated.

According to Fitting, judging by the trends in pottery styles within the Younge tradition, the Younge site occupation is slightly later in the sequence than that of Riviere au Vase.

The Late Woodland sequence of the Younge tradition roughly coincides with the Glen Meyer and Pickering Early Ontario Iroquois tradition in Canada, and the Owasco (pre-Iroquois) phase in New York state. It has been suggested, based on certain similarities in pottery styles, that they are all related and therefore the Younge tradition peoples may have been speakers of an Iroquoian language. Greenman points out the similarities between the artifacts found at Younge and the artifacts from the Uren site, a Proto-Neutral Ontario Iroquois site in Canada.

== Significance ==
The Riviere au Vase Site was among the earliest sites to be excavated in southeastern Michigan. The large sample of pottery has been instrumental in developing a chronological and cultural sequence for the region. Also, the large number of burials present at the site illustrate some of the mortuary customs from this period.
