= John and Julia Hevener House =

- U.S. National Register of Historic Places
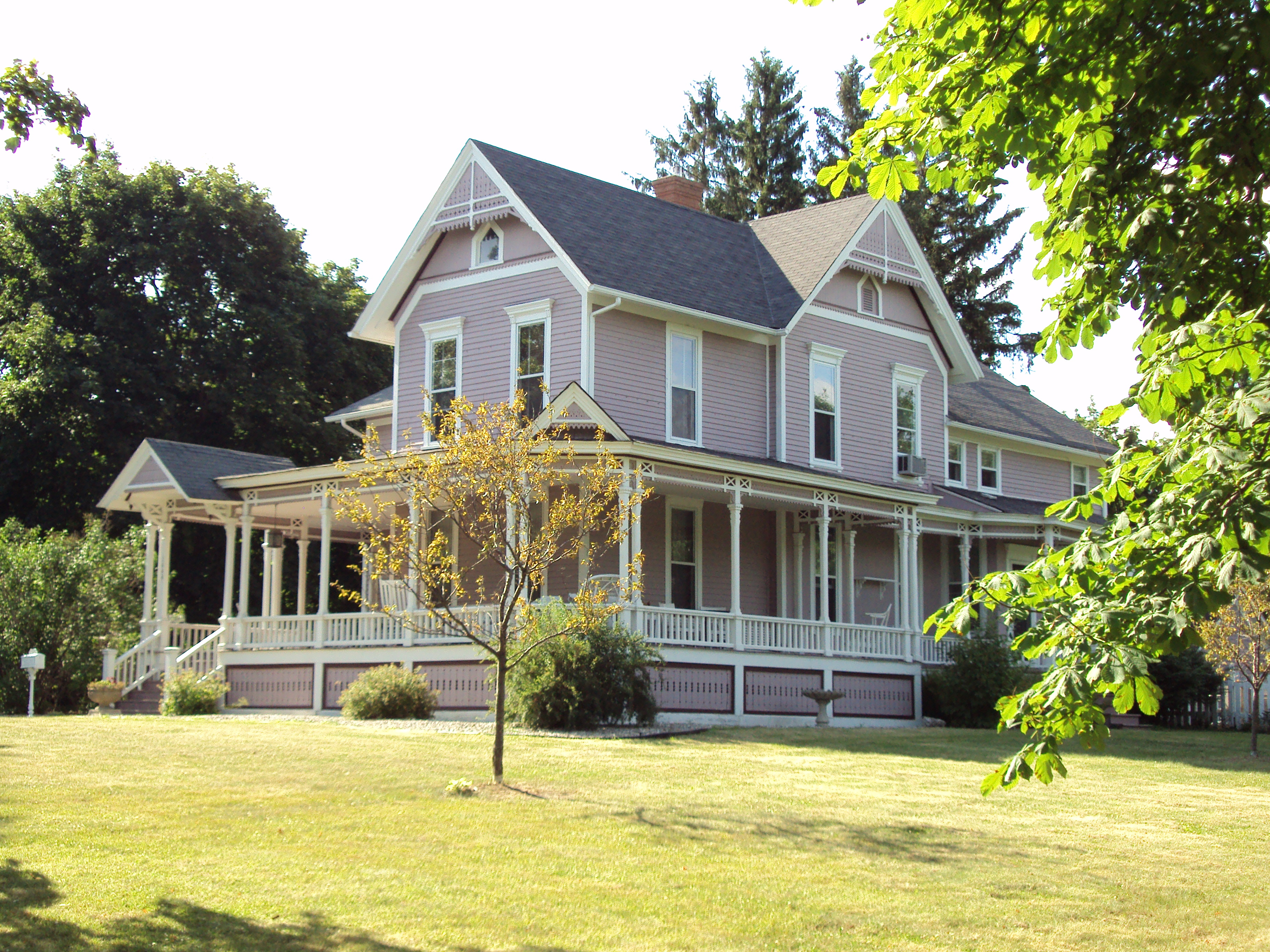

- Location within Michigan Location within the United States
- Interactive map
- Location: 1444 W. Genesee, Lapeer, Michigan
- Coordinates: 43°03′03″N 83°19′22″W
- Area: less than one acre
- Built: 1884
- Architectural style: Queen Anne
- MPS: Lapeer MRA
- NRHP reference No.: 85001628
- Added to NRHP: July 26, 1985

The John and Julia Hevener House is a single-family home located at 1444 West Genesee in Lapeer, Michigan. It was listed on the National Register of Historic Places in 1985.

== History ==
John Hevener was born in 1842. In the mid-1860s, he became a business partner of Enoch J. White, one of Lapeer's founding settlers. The two men founded and ran a highly successful general store. Henever served at various times as Mayor of Lapeer, Superintendent of the County Poor, Board of Education Secretary, and Trustee of School District #2. John and Julia Hevener purchased this lot from Enoch White in 1884, and constructed this house. They lived in the house for nearly 30 years. In the 20th century, the house was converted into doctor's offices and then into apartments. It was later restored as a single family dwelling.

== Description ==
The Hevener House is one of the most elaborate Queen Anne-styled residences in Lapeer, distinguished by the ornateness, complexity and delicacy of its Queen Anne-inspired detailing. It is a two-and-one-half-story house with irregular massing, varied exterior wood surface treatments, and a large wrap-around porch with decorative supports. The house sits on a stone foundation and is covered with clapboard, and shingling and vergeboards in the main gables, gable corners, and gabled pediments of the porch roof. There is a bay window on one east facade and small pointed attic windows in the gable ends.
