= Day House (Springfield, Missouri) =

Historic house in Missouri, United States

- U.S. National Register of Historic Places
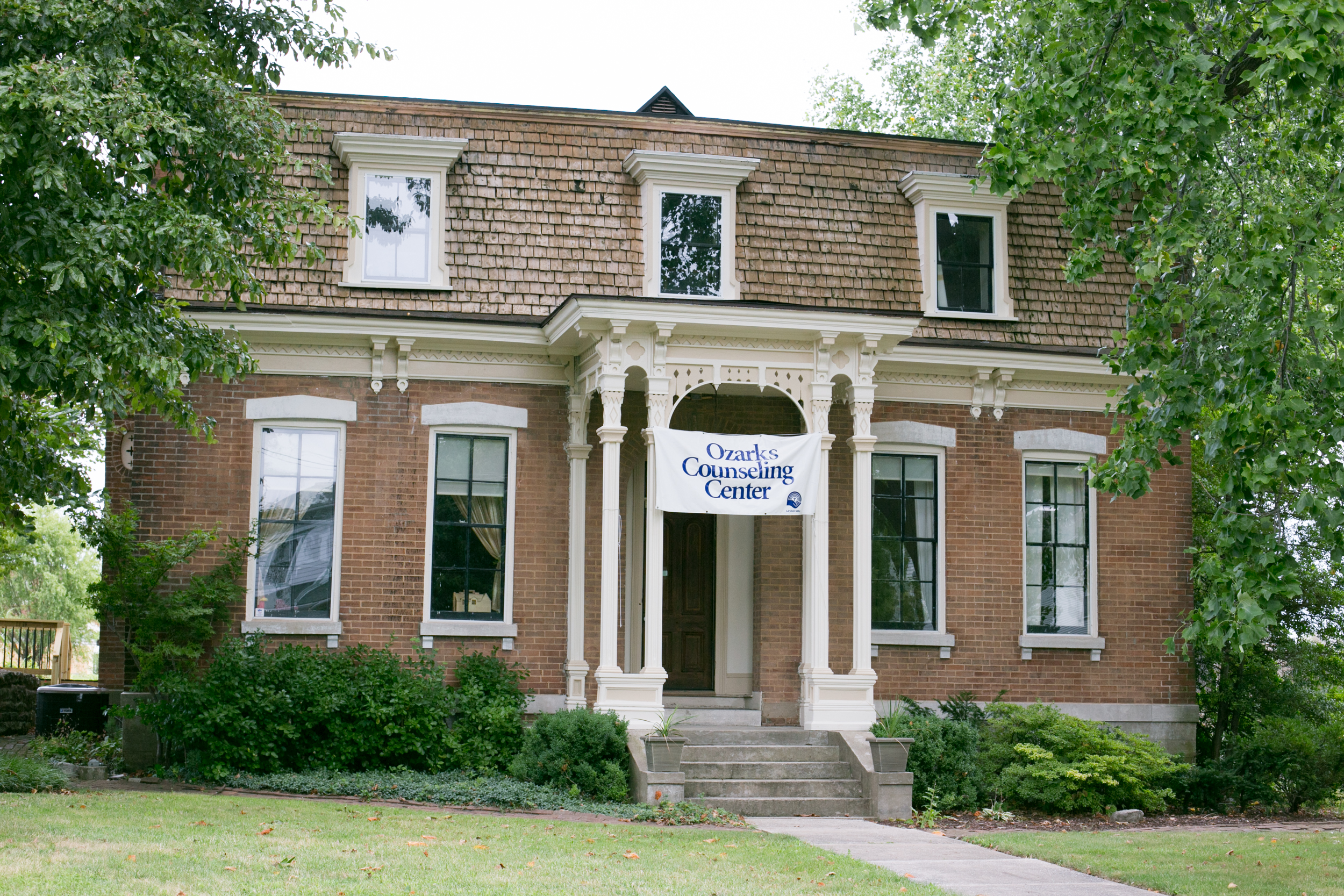
- Day House, September 2014

- Location within Missouri Location within the United States
- Location: 614 South St., Springfield, Missouri
- Coordinates: 37°12′12″N 93°17′31″W
- Area: less than one acre
- Built: 1875
- Architectural style: L plan
- NRHP reference No.: 76001110
- Added to NRHP: November 7, 1976

Day House is a historic home located at Springfield, Greene County, Missouri.

== Description ==
It was built in 1875, and is a two-story, five-bay, L-plan brick dwelling. It features a mansard roof with triple dormers. It was the home of Springfield businessman and local politician, George Sale Day. The building is now occupied by the Ozarks Counseling Center.

== Significance ==
It was listed on the National Register of Historic Places in 1976.
