= North Branch Township, Michigan =

- Civil township
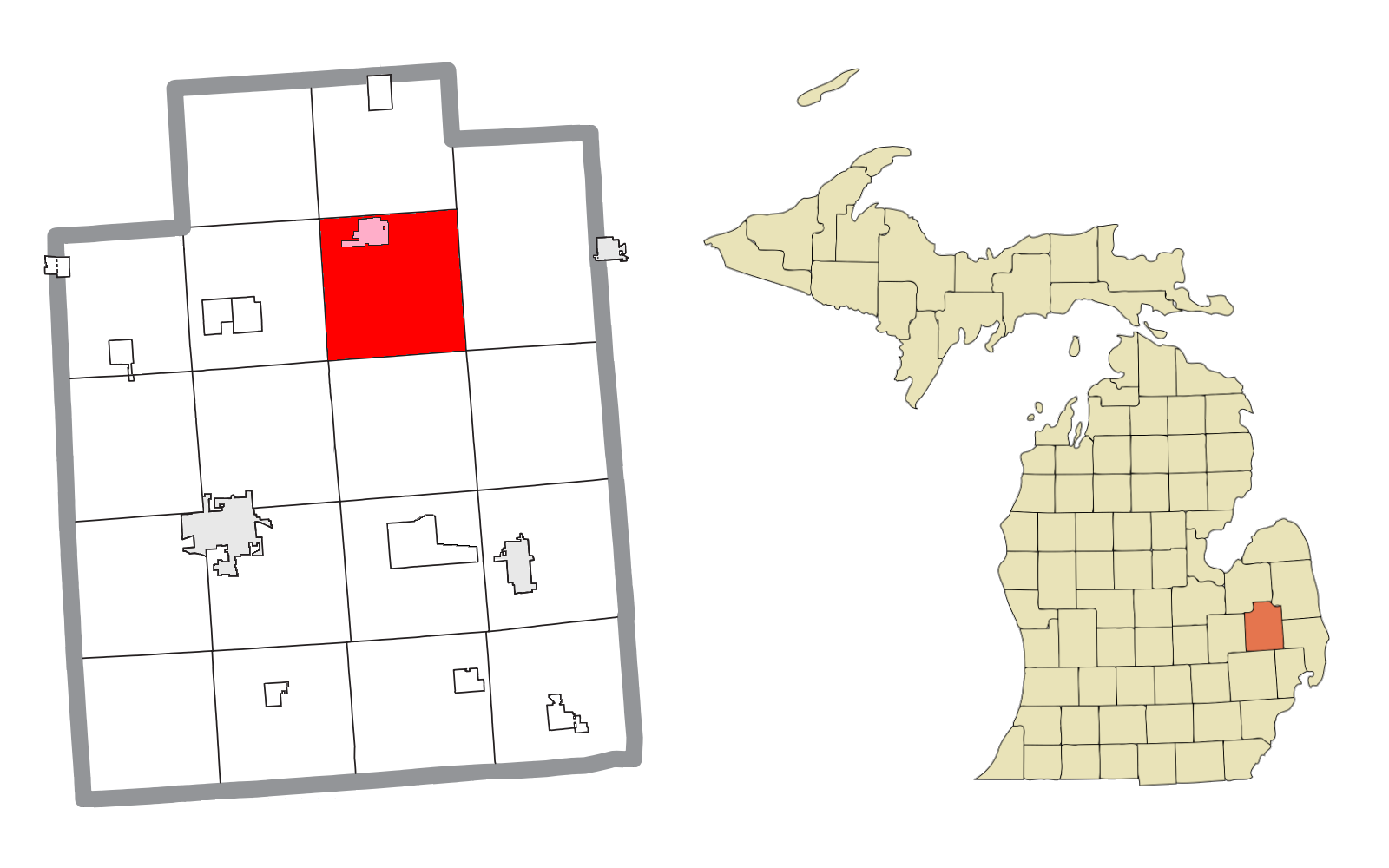
- Location within Lapeer County (red) and the administered village of North Branch (pink)

- Location within the state of Michigan Location within the United States
- Coordinates: 43°12′24″N 83°11′10″W
- Country: United States
- State: Michigan
- County: Lapeer

Area
  - Total: 36.3 sq mi (94.1 km^{2})
  - Land: 36.1 sq mi (93.6 km^{2})
  - Water: 0.15 sq mi (0.4 km^{2})
- Elevation: 817 ft (249 m)

Population (2020)
  - Total: 3,571
  - Density: 98.8/sq mi (38.2/km^{2})
- Time zone: UTC-5 (Eastern (EST))
  - Summer (DST): UTC-4 (EDT)
- ZIP code: 48461
- Area code: 810
- FIPS code: 26-58090
- GNIS feature ID: 1626811
- Website: https://www.northbranchtwp.com/

North Branch Township is a civil township of Lapeer County in the U.S. state of Michigan. The population was 3,571 at the 2020 census. The Village of North Branch is located within the township.

== Geography ==
According to the United States Census Bureau, the township has a total area of 36.3 square miles (94 km^{2}), of which 36.2 square miles (94 km^{2}) is land and 0.2 square miles (0.52 km^{2}) (0.47%) is water.

== Demographics ==
As of the census of 2010, there were 3,645 people, 1,189 households, and 939 families residing in the township. The population density was 99.5 inhabitants per square mile (38.4/km^{2}). There were 1,253 housing units at an average density of 34.7 per square mile (13.4/km^{2}). The racial makeup of the township was 97.13% White, 0.11% African American, 0.33% Native American, 0.14% Asian, 0.95% from other races, and 1.34% from two or more races. Hispanic or Latino of any race were 3.09% of the population.

There were 1,189 households, out of which 43.4% had children under the age of 18 living with them, 65.1% were married couples living together, 9.2% had a female householder with no husband present, and 21.0% were non-families. 18.6% of all households were made up of individuals, and 9.0% had someone living alone who was 65 years of age or older. The average household size was 2.99 and the average family size was 3.39.

In the township the population was spread out, with 31.8% under the age of 18, 9.1% from 18 to 24, 28.7% from 25 to 44, 20.8% from 45 to 64, and 9.6% who were 65 years of age or older. The median age was 33 years. For every 100 females, there were 101.0 males. For every 100 females age 18 and over, there were 97.2 males.

The median income for a household in the township was $46,020, and the median income for a family was $51,378. Males had a median income of $41,438 versus $22,750 for females. The per capita income for the township was $16,972. About 3.8% of families and 5.8% of the population were below the poverty line, including 5.9% of those under age 18 and 8.8% of those age 65 or over.
