= Day-Vandevander Mill =

- U.S. National Register of Historic Places
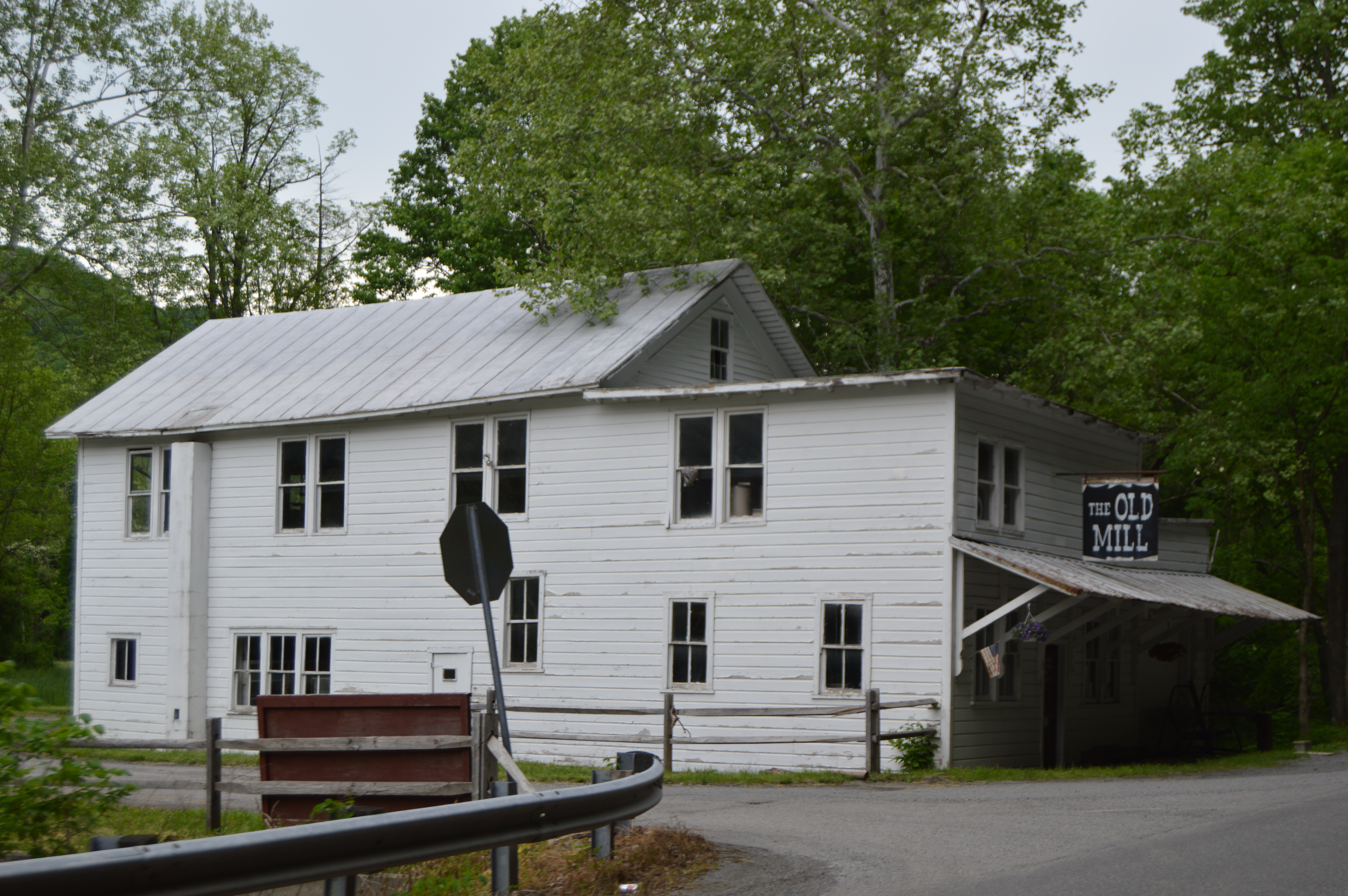
- Southern side and front

- Location within West Virginia Location within the United States
- Location: WV 32, near Harman, West Virginia
- Coordinates: 38°55′57″N 79°31′19″W
- Area: 2 acres (0.81 ha)
- Built: 1877
- NRHP reference No.: 87001173
- Added to NRHP: July 21, 1987

Day-Vandevander Mill — also known as the Old Mill at Harman — is a historic grist mill located near Harman, Randolph County, West Virginia. The original structure was built about 1877, and is a mortice and tenon, hand hewn post and beam structure. The additions built in the 1920s are studded wall frame construction. The property includes the original mill pond and tail race. It is open as a mill museum.

It was listed on the National Register of Historic Places in 1987.
