= Warren Perry House =

- U.S. National Register of Historic Places
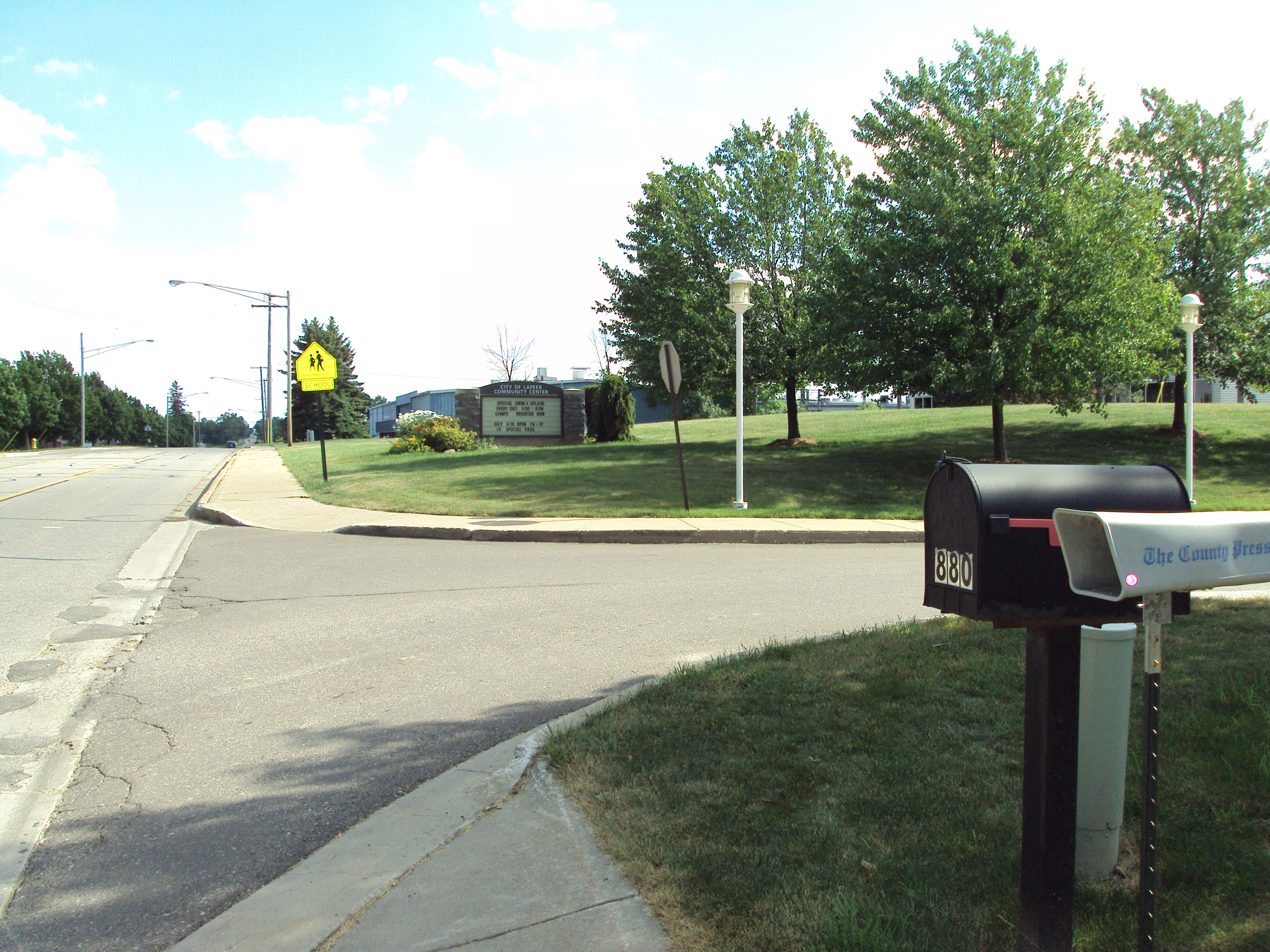
- Former location of the Warren Perry House
- Interactive map
- Location: 1497 W. Genesee St., Lapeer, Michigan
- Coordinates: 43°03′01″N 83°19′24″W
- Area: 1.3 acres (0.53 ha)
- Built: c. 1890
- Architectural style: Queen Anne
- MPS: Lapeer MRA
- NRHP reference No.: 85001630
- Added to NRHP: July 26, 1985

The Warren Perry House is a single-family home now located at 1497 West Genesee Street in Lapeer, Michigan. It was originally built in 1890 at what is now 892 Saginaw Street. It was listed on the National Register of Historic Places in 1985.

== History ==
Warren Perry was a prosperous farmer who lived at what was then the southeastern outskirts of Lapeer in the late 19th century. Perry built this farmhouse on Saginaw Street in the early 1890s. After Warren Perry, the home was owned by three additional farmers: - Asa Farnsworth (whose family settled in Lapeer County in the 1840s), Michael and Mary Kearney, and Matthew Wheatley. The home was later owned by Lapeer Metal Products today, who used as a rented single family residence. The home was moved some time after 1985 to its present location on Genesee.

== Description ==
The Warren Perry House us a 2 1/2-story wooden house with irregular massing and wooden decorative elements representative of the Queen Anne style. The gables contain diagonal clapboarding, saw-tooth shingling, and pierced vergeboards. The second floor windows in the front facade's projecting bay are topped with curved hoods. The entryway is located on the recessed bay of the front facade, and is sheltered by a small porch with a gable to one side.
