= William H. and Sabrina Watson House =

- U.S. National Register of Historic Places
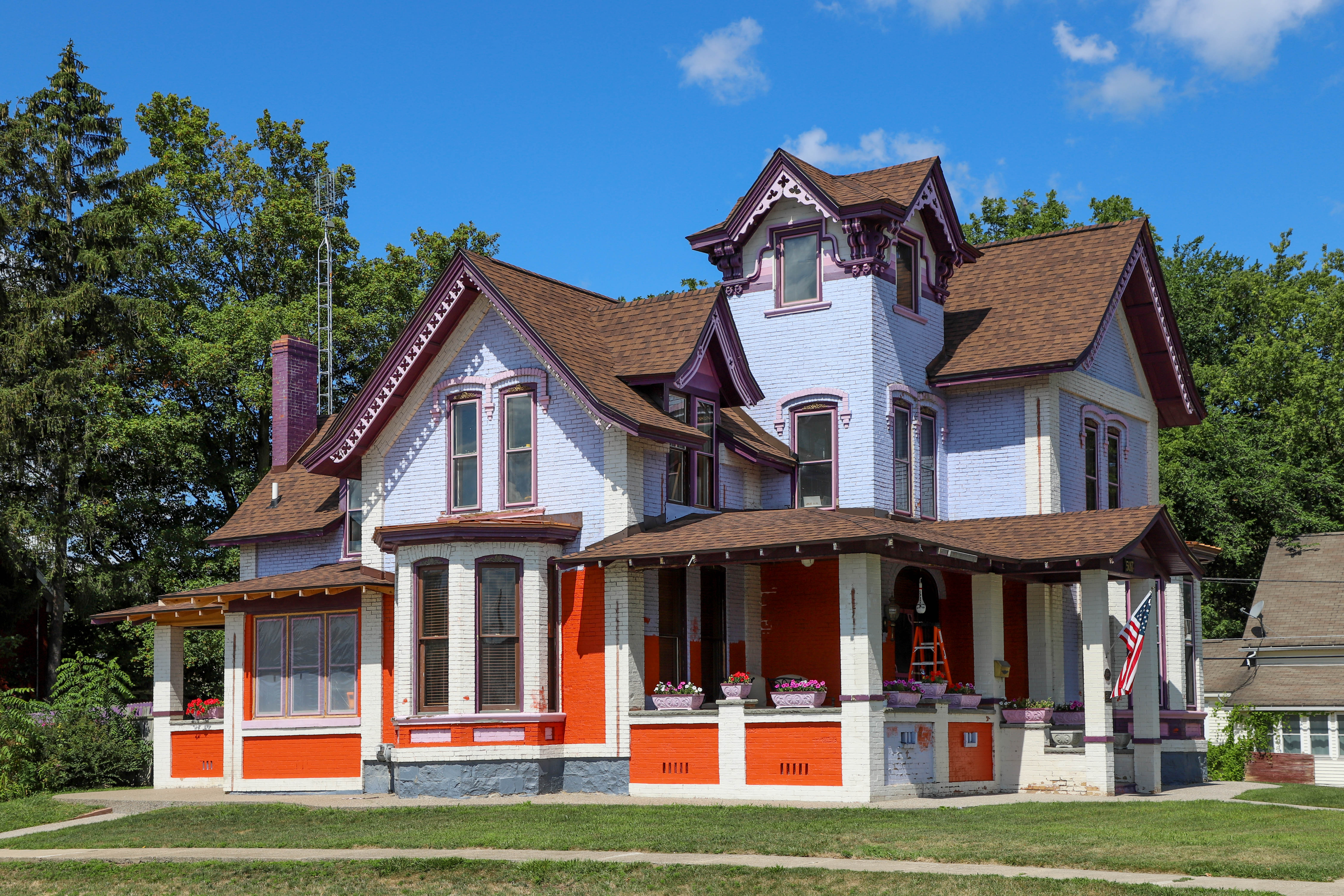
- William H. and Sabrina Watson House, Lapeer, Michigan.
- Interactive map
- Location: 507 Cedar St., Lapeer, Michigan
- Coordinates: 43°03′18″N 83°18′45″W
- Area: less than one acre
- Built: 1878
- Architectural style: Queen Anne, Italian Villa
- MPS: Lapeer MRA
- NRHP reference No.: 85001635
- Added to NRHP: July 26, 1985

The William H. and Sabrina Watson House is a single-family home located at 507 Cedar Street in Lapeer, Michigan. It was listed on the National Register of Historic Places in 1985.

== History ==
William H. Watson was a florist who sold greenhouse, bedding, and vegetable plants. He and his wife, Sabrina, constructed an earlier house on this property. They then had this house constructed, likely in 1878–79. It was one of the first Queen Anne houses constructed in Lapeer. Later occupants of the house included W.S. Abbot, a postmaster, and John B. Sutton. In 1911, Sutton sold the house to real estate agent Elmer Holman Sr., who added substantial details to the interior. The house remained in the Holman family until 1984.

== Description ==
The Watson House is a two-story brick structure, with a dominant square three-story tower on the front facade. The tower is capped by a cross-gabled roof, with large and elaborate paired brackets. Wooden molding encircles the tower, creating a base for the brackets and a hoodmold for the tower windows. The roofline of the house is steep and complex, with intersecting sightlines and corners. Windows come in a variety of window shapes and sizes, and the facade is ornamented with panels, band courses, and piers. The current front porch, constructed in 1920, is a wraparound brick porch with a small projecting portico supported by brick columns.

Inside the house, detailing includes unusual marbleizing and stenciling in the first floor rooms. The front has a terrazzo floor.
