= Pioneer State Bank No. 36 =

- U.S. National Register of Historic Places
- Michigan State Historic Site
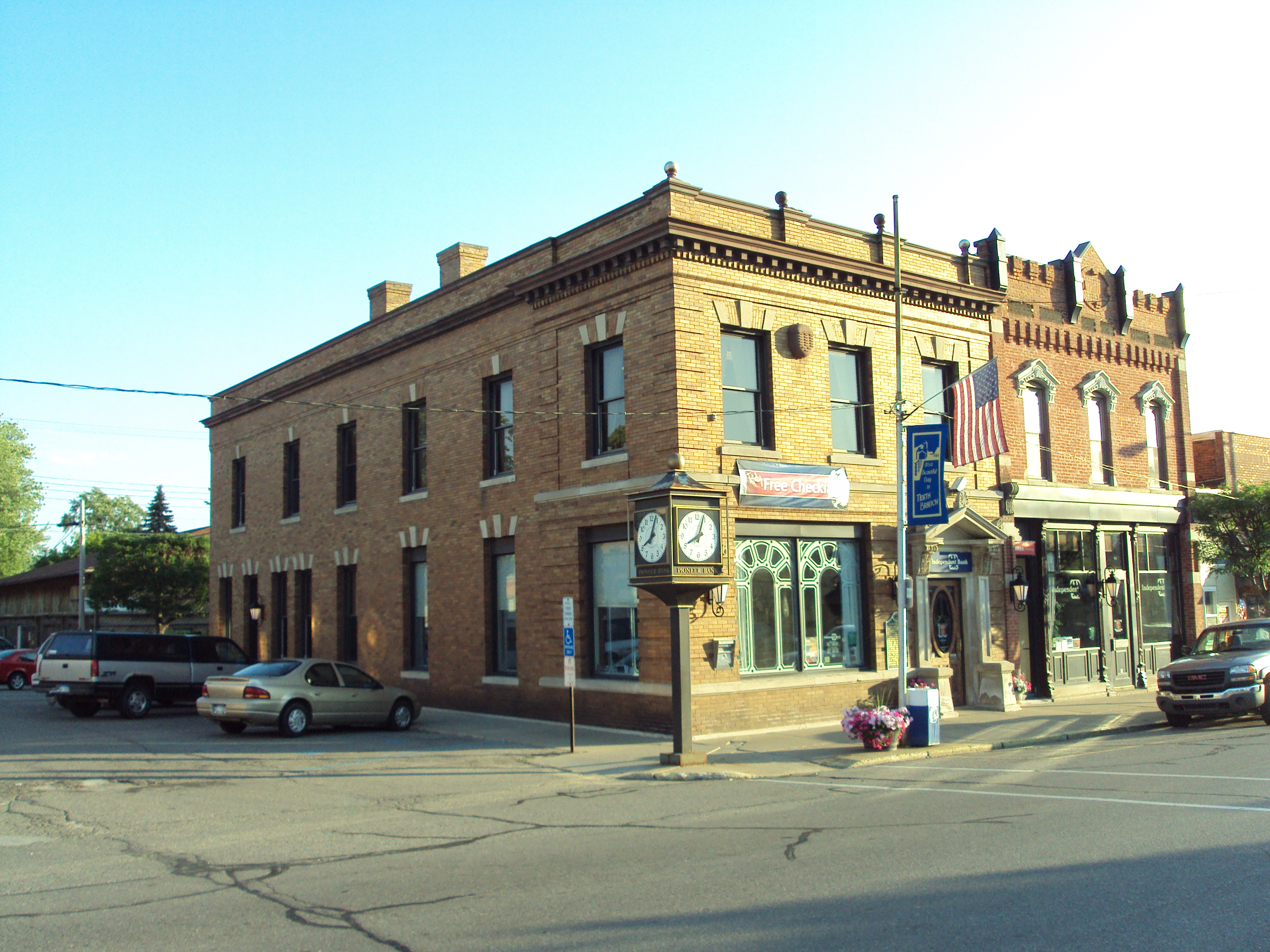

- Location within Michigan Location within the United States
- Interactive map
- Location: 4046 Huron Street (M-90); North Branch, Michigan
- Coordinates: 43°13′45″N 83°11′36″W
- Built: 1906
- Architect: Dillon Clark, Alverton Munger
- Architectural style: Renaissance Revival
- NRHP reference No.: 82002846

Significant dates
- Added to NRHP: April 22, 1982
- Designated MSHS: October 23, 1979

The Pioneer State Bank No. 36 is a bank building located at 4046 Huron Street (M-90) in the village of North Branch in North Branch Township in northern Lapeer County, Michigan. The bank stands as the oldest bank institution in North Branch. It was designated as a Michigan State Historic Site on October 23, 1979, and later added to the National Register of Historic Places on April 22, 1982.

== History ==
Pioneer State Bank was founded in 1885. In 1889, by Frederick C. Ballard, a prominent local investor and financier, helped reorganize the bank. In 1902, Ballard's son Charles commissioned architects Dillon Clark and Alverton Munger of Bay City to design this building. In 1903 he purchased the present site for the new building, and construction was completed in 1906. The structure continues to operate as an independent bank.

== Description ==
The Pioneer State Bank building is a simple, rectangular, two-story brick building in the style of Renaissance Revival architecture. It measures 24 feet by 79 feet. The main facade has a classically inspired first floor door enframement, flanked by pilasters and capped by a pediment. A single large window is to one side. Three one-over-one double hung windows with limestone lintels are arranged symmetrically on the second floor. Brick quoins decorate the corner, and limestone beltcourses at the first and second story levels, and the brick cornice line, continue around from the front to first bay of the side facade. The remaining five bays are simpler in design.
