= Calvin Day House =

Historic house in Connecticut, United States

- U.S. National Register of Historic Places
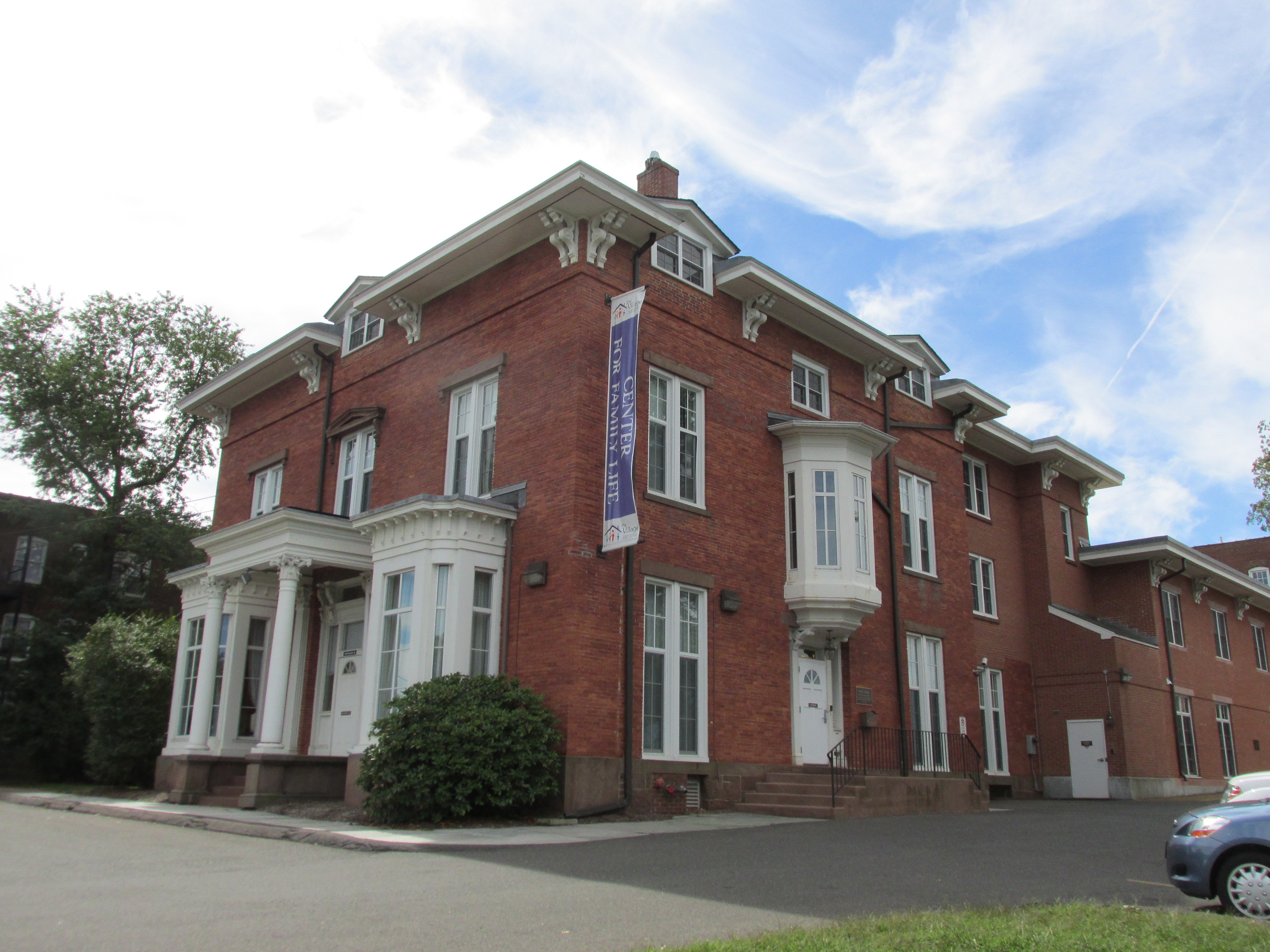

- Location within Connecticut Location within the United States
- Location: 105 Spring Street, Hartford, Connecticut
- Coordinates: 41°46′16″N 72°41′3″W
- Area: 0.8 acres (0.32 ha)
- Built: 1852
- Architectural style: Italianate
- NRHP reference No.: 78002872
- Added to NRHP: December 18, 1978

The Calvin Day House is a historic house at 105 Spring Street in Hartford, Connecticut. Built in 1852, it is the last survivor of a series of fine Italianate houses that lined a bluff overlooking Hartford's Union Station. It was listed on the National Register of Historic Places in 1978. It now houses a social service agency.

== Description and history ==
The Calvin Day House is located in Hartford's Asylum Hill neighborhood, north of downtown, at the southwest corner of Myrtle and Spring Streets. It is a two-story brick building, roughly rectangular in shape, with a low-pitch hip roof topped by an octagonal cupola. The roof has an extended eave with paired decorative brackets, and is pierced by gabled wall dormers. The main facade faces east toward Spring Street, and is three bays wide. The ground floor outer bays have tall projecting bays, topped with bracketed roofs. In the center is the main entrance, sheltered by a porch with Corinthian columns supporting a simple entablature. On the Myrtle Street facade is a secondary entrance, above which on the second floor is a projecting oriel window. A mid-20th century wing extends to the rear; it has sympathetic styling. The interior has retained much of its original styling, despite conversion to non-residential use.

The house was built in 1852 for J. Seymour Brown, a bookbinder, who sold it in 1855 to Calvin Day. Day was a prominent local businessman, whose roles included president of the Hartford, Providence and Fishkill Railroad, and of the Wadsworth Atheneum. He served as Lieutenant Governor of Connecticut from 1857 to 1858 and was active in the affairs of the Republican Party in Connecticut. The house passed to his daughter, whose heirs sold it in 1921 to a local women's shelter.

Spring Street runs roughly north–south along a bluff that now overlooks Interstate 84, with Hartford's Union Station just beyond. In Calvin Day's time, the street was lined with similar high quality houses. All the others have since been torn down, either early in the 20th century to be replaced by apartment blocks, or later during urban renewal. Similar houses still survive on other streets in the Asylum Hill area.

== See also ==
- National Register of Historic Places listings in Hartford, Connecticut
