= Peter Van Dyke House =

- U.S. National Register of Historic Places
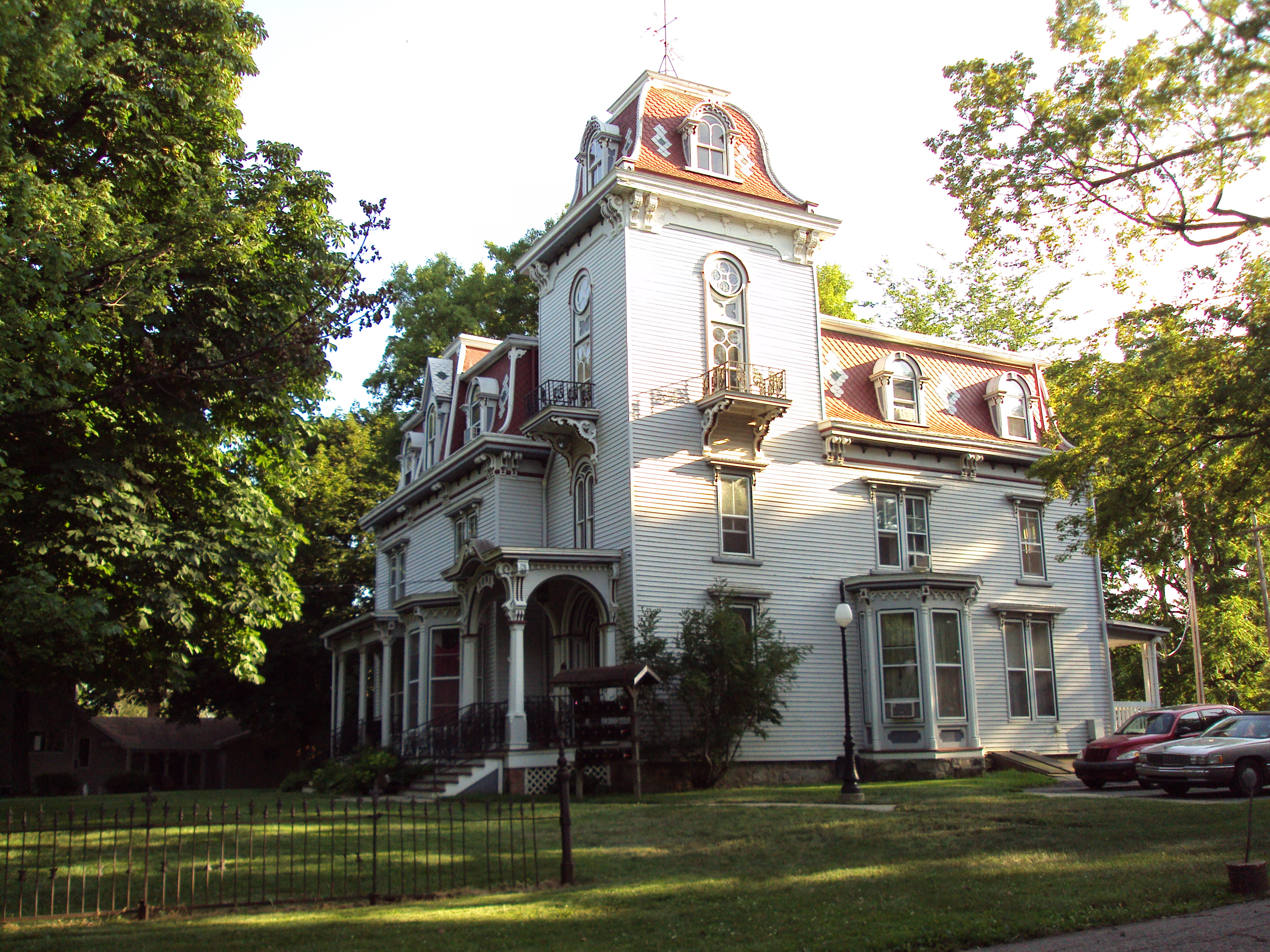

- Location within Michigan Location within the United States
- Interactive map
- Location: 1091 Pine St., Lapeer, Michigan
- Coordinates: 43°03′34″N 83°18′44″W
- Area: less than one acre
- Built: 1873
- Architectural style: Second Empire
- MPS: Lapeer MRA
- NRHP reference No.: 85001634
- Added to NRHP: July 26, 1985

The Peter Van Dyke House is a single-family home, now converted into apartments, located at 1091 Pine Street in Lapeer, Michigan. It was listed on the National Register of Historic Places in 1985.

== History ==
This house was constructed for Peter Van Dyke in 1873. In 1880, Samuel J. Tomlinson, editor of The Lapeer Clarion, moved from his previous house to this one. Later, Frances and Mary Ellen Hunter purchased this house and in 1924 opened it as a private hospital. It operated as a hospital until 1953. It was later refurbished into apartments.

== Description ==
The Peter Van Dyke House is an imposing Second Empire structure sheathed in clapboard, with a four-story tower. It is profusely decorated with a porch, small balconies, and differently designed brackets along the eavesline, The mansard roof has arched or steeply gabled projecting dormers. The front entrance is located in the base of the tower, and is covered with a small porch with chamfered columns and decorative cornice. The entryway is through paired doors beneath a curved transom containing etched ruby glass. Paired windows in an arched frame are in the second story above, while the third floor has arched windows and the fourth ocular windows.
