= Ivan W. Day House =

Historic house in Idaho, United States

- U.S. National Register of Historic Places
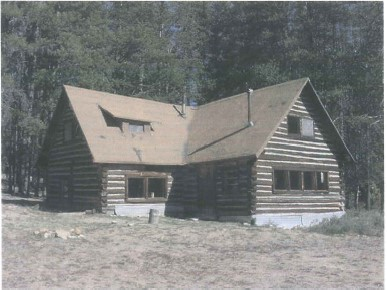

- Location within Idaho Location within the United States
- Nearest city: Stanley, Idaho
- Coordinates: 44°16′6″N 114°57′5″W
- Area: 2.5 acres (1.0 ha)
- Built: c.1936
- Architectural style: Rustic style
- NRHP reference No.: 86000754
- Added to NRHP: April 9, 1986

The Ivan W. Day House near Stanley, Idaho is a c.1936-built Rustic style log cabin also known as Doc Day Cabin. It was listed on the National Register of Historic Places in 1986.

It was deemed "architecturally significant as a well-preserved and nearly unaltered example of Depression era log housing in the Stanley Basin-Sawtooth Valley region. The building represents the influence of the Rustic Style, which used log construction in a self-conscious attempt to create a countrified atmosphere, upon vernacular construction."
