= James F. Fairweather–Jacob C. Lamb House =

- U.S. National Register of Historic Places
- Michigan State Historic Site
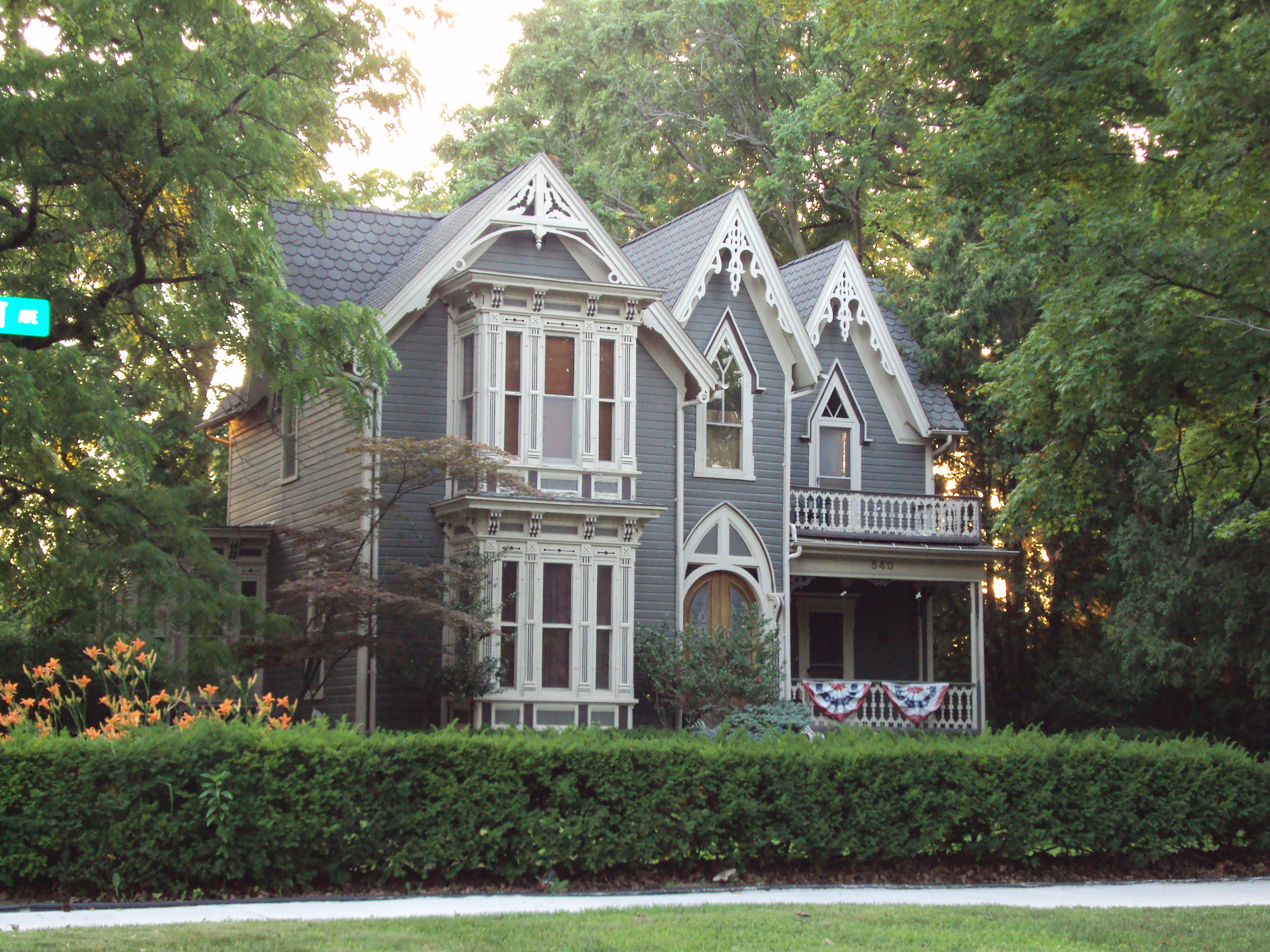

- Location within Michigan
- Interactive map
- Location: 540 S. Almont Ave., Imlay City, Michigan
- Coordinates: 43°01′07″N 83°04′39″W
- Area: 0.5 acres (0.20 ha)
- Built: 1871
- Architectural style: Gothic Revival
- NRHP reference No.: 85002494
- Added to NRHP: September 26, 1985

The James F. Fairweather–Jacob C. Lamb House is a private house located at 540 South Almont Avenue in Imlay City, Michigan. It was listed on the National Register of Historic Places in 1985.

== History ==
The Fairweather family settled in Imlay City in the early 1860s, and by 1864 was farming on land south of town. At about that time one family member, James F. Fairweather, started a drygoods business in town. Although settled much earlier, Imlay City was not actually platted until 1870, when the Port Huron and Lake Michigan Railroad constructed a line through the settlement. The arrival of the railroad created a business boom, and in 1871 James Fairweather purchased a lot in town, and by 1874 had this house constructed.

In 1879 James F. Fairweather ended his business, sold his home, and apparently moved from Imlay City. The new owner of the house was Jacob C. Lamb, who was born in Burlington County, New Jersey in 1828 and had settled in Dryden, Michigan in 1854. He began farming, and also ran a mercantile business dealing in wool with his brother. By 1867 he was dealing over 250,000 pounds of wool, and in 1871 constructed a grain elevator in Imlay City, and in 1876 an evaporator used to dry fruit. Lamb maintained his house in Dryden until 1878, when he moved into this house in Imlay City. He continued his various business enterprises, and by 1880 ran one of the county's largest businesses, with a yearly income of over $250,000.

Lamb and his family owned this house until 1907, when it was sold to the Hovey family. In 1922, Mark Cheney, the village's tax assessor, bought the house. It remained in the Cheney family for many years.

== Description ==
This house is a two-story wood frame Gothic Revival structure covered with clapboard. It has an L-shaped plan with a tower-like projection in the front containing the entrance. Two single-story additions are in the rear, constructed in the late 19th and early 20th century. The original portion of the home is three bays wide, each topped with a steep gable containing ornamental bargeboards in the gable ends. The elaborate detailing includes Gothic pointed arch door and window enframements, and single- and two-story bay windows.

The interior includes a center stair surrounded by a living room, foyer and parlor, and a library/sunroom. The dining room, kitchen, and bath are in the rear addition. On the second floor, the floor plan echoes the lower story, with three bedrooms and a sewing room aligned with the major rooms downstairs.
