= Goodland Township, Michigan =

- Civil township
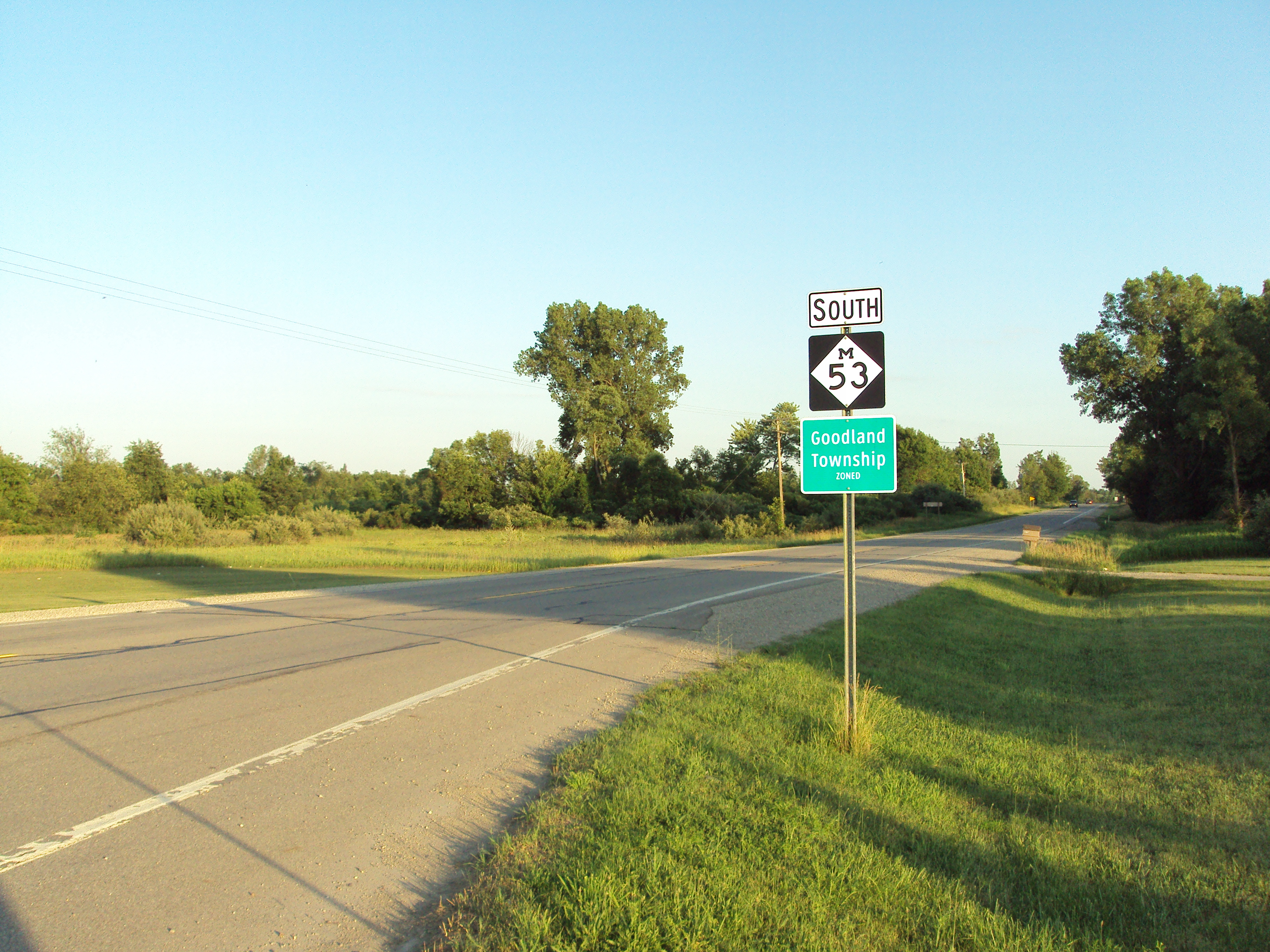
- Entering Goodland Township along M-53

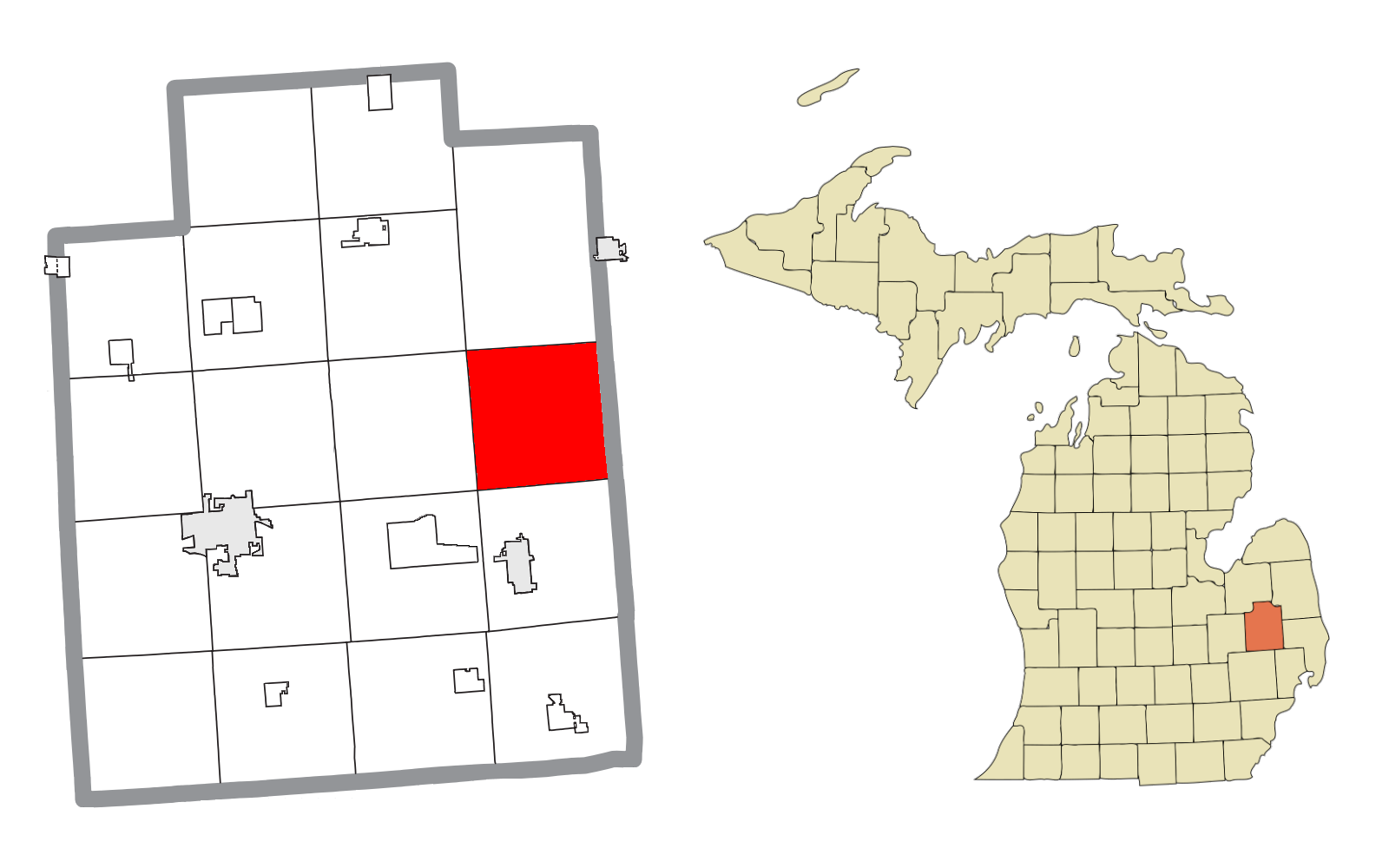
- Location within Lapeer County

- Location within the state of Michigan Location within the United States
- Coordinates: 43°06′48″N 83°03′03″W
- Country: United States
- State: Michigan
- County: Lapeer
- Organized: 1855

Government
  - Supervisor: Mike Eckardt
  - Clerk: Amy Nolin

Area
  - Total: 35.76 sq mi (92.62 km^{2})
  - Land: 35.58 sq mi (92.15 km^{2})
  - Water: 0.18 sq mi (0.47 km^{2})
- Elevation: 801 ft (244 m)

Population (2020)
  - Total: 1,735
  - Density: 48.76/sq mi (18.83/km^{2})
- Time zone: UTC-5 (Eastern (EST))
  - Summer (DST): UTC-4 (EDT)
- ZIP code(s): 48444 (Imlay City); 48416 (Brown City)
- Area code: 810
- FIPS code: 26-32960
- GNIS feature ID: 1626363
- Website: Official website

Goodland Township is a civil township of Lapeer County in the U.S. state of Michigan. The population was 1,735 at the 2020 census. The historic Younge Site is located within the township.

== Communities ==
- Goodland is an unincorporated community in the township on M-53 at 43°05′41″N 83°04′21″W. James Hills was the first white settler here in 1851, although he soon moved elsewhere. Hills is said to have recommended the name "Goodland" when the township was organized in 1855. A post office was opened on July 11, 1856, with John C. Marris as the first postmaster. The office closed on April 15, 1901.

== Geography ==
According to the U.S. Census Bureau, the township has a total area of 35.76 square miles (92.62 km^{2}), of which 35.58 square miles (92.15 km^{2}) is land and 0.18 square miles (0.47 km^{2}) (0.50%) is water.

== Demographics ==
As of the census of 2000, there were 1,734 people, 589 households, and 478 families residing in the township. The population density was 48.6 inhabitants per square mile (18.8/km^{2}). There were 621 housing units at an average density of 17.4 per square mile (6.7/km^{2}). The racial makeup of the township was 98.21% White, 0.35% African American, 0.17% Asian, 0.69% from other races, and 0.58% from two or more races. Hispanic or Latino of any race were 3.58% of the population.

There were 589 households, out of which 39.6% had children under the age of 18 living with them, 69.1% were married couples living together, 6.8% had a female householder with no husband present, and 18.8% were non-families. 14.3% of all households were made up of individuals, and 5.1% had someone living alone who was 65 years of age or older. The average household size was 2.94 and the average family size was 3.25.

In the township the population was spread out, with 29.4% under the age of 18, 6.8% from 18 to 24, 31.2% from 25 to 44, 23.5% from 45 to 64, and 9.1% who were 65 years of age or older. The median age was 35 years. For every 100 females, there were 108.2 males. For every 100 females age 18 and over, there were 105.9 males.

The median income for a household in the township was $51,313, and the median income for a family was $55,875. Males had a median income of $42,313 versus $25,820 for females. The per capita income for the township was $19,999. About 4.1% of families and 7.0% of the population were below the poverty line, including 11.9% of those under age 18 and 3.7% of those age 65 or over.
