= Piety Hill Historic District =

Historic district in Michigan, United States

- U.S. National Register of Historic Places
- U.S. Historic district
- Michigan State Historic Site
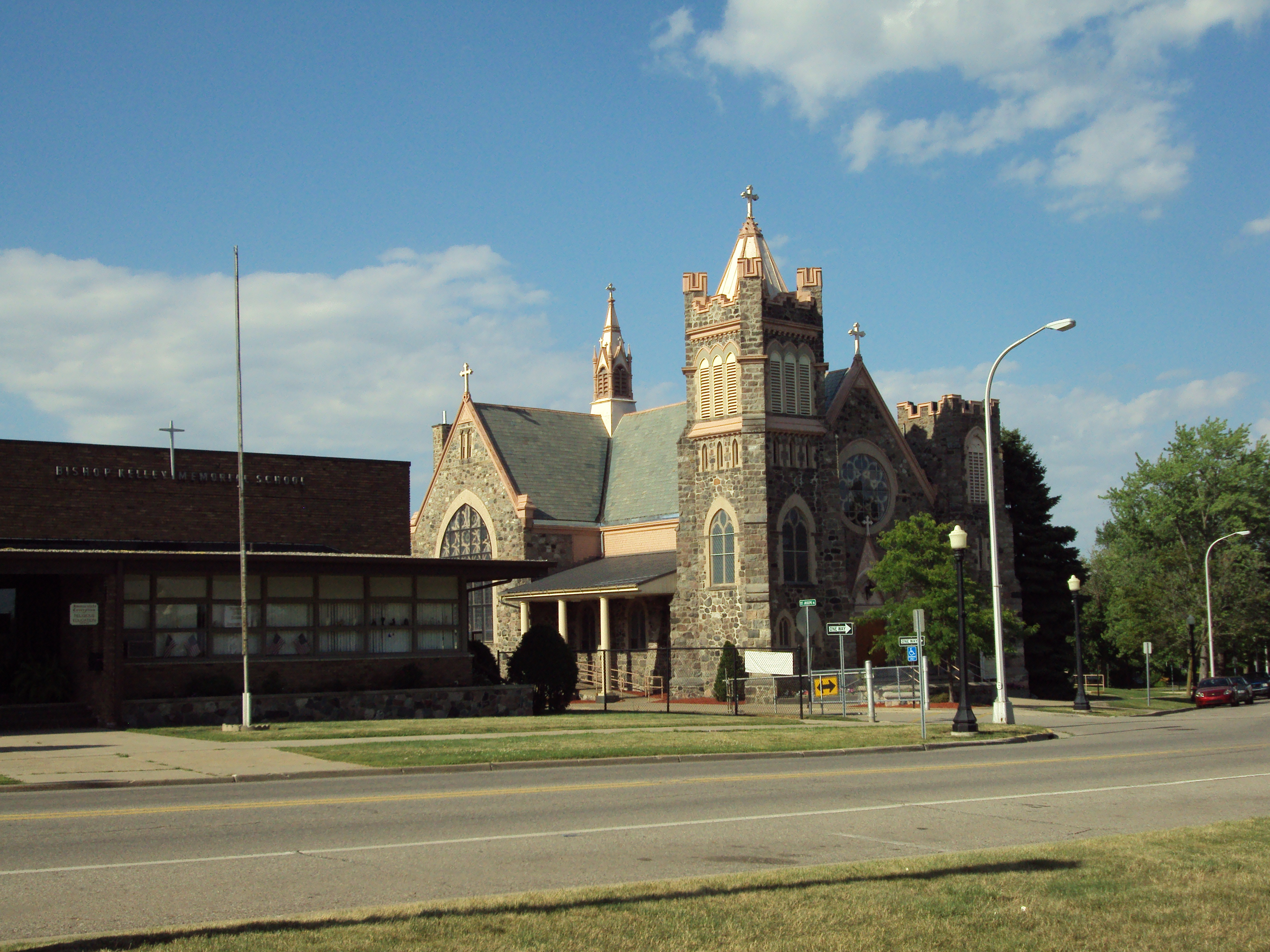
- Immaculate Conception Church (814 W. Nepessing St.)

- Location within Michigan Location within the United States
- Interactive map
- Location: Lapeer, Michigan
- Coordinates: 43°03′09″N 83°19′00″W
- Area: 15.5 acres (6.3 ha)
- Built: 1830–1932
- Architectural style: Georgian, Greek Revival, Queen Anne, Second Empire, Victorian
- MPS: Lapeer MRA
- NRHP reference No.: 85001631

Significant dates
- Added to NRHP: July 26, 1985
- Designated MSHS: July 26, 1985

The Piety Hill Historic District is a historic district located in downtown Lapeer in Lapeer County, Michigan, USA. It was designated as a Michigan State Historic Site and also added to the National Register of Historic Places on July 26, 1985.

The 15.5 acre (6.3 ha) district is very irregularly shaped and includes 29 assorted properties along the streets of Calhoun, Monroe, Madison, Washington, Main (M-24), Park, Liberty, Church, and Nepessing in the city of Lapeer. The district includes several Greek Revival houses dating from around 1830–1850. Other houses in the style of Queen Anne and Second Empire are scattered throughout the district. The most recent structures included as contributing properties within the district are a Georgian-style library (1923) and post office (1932). Piety Hill Historic District is the center of Lapeer's early religious gatherings and is the oldest platted section of Lapeer. Today, the district includes five different church structures dating from 1881–1911, although the majority of the properties in the district are single-family dwellings.

Probably the most significant structure in the district is the Eagle Tavern, located at 237 N. Main Street. In 1831, J.R. White arrived in Lapeer after buying an interest in a lumber mill; the next year he was joined by his brother Phineas. The brothers bought the mill outright, and were soon joined by the rest of their family. In 1836, one brother, Enoch Jay White, decided to enter the tavern business, and constructed this Greek Revival inn along the stagecoach line. The Eagle Tavern is a two-story wooden building sheathed in clapboard. It has a central door with a small portico, and symmetrically placed single and paired two-over-two windows. The building was used as a tavern until 1850, when it was converted into a two-family residence. Around 1900 the building was rented to the Catholic Extension Society, and in 1907 became vacant. In 1919, E.T. White rehabilitated the house.

Also included in the district are five churches. The most significant are the 1881/81 Grace Episcopal Church and the 1896-1901 Church of the Immaculate Conception. The Grace Episcopal Church congregation was organized in 1878, and work on the current church began in 1881. The church is red brick, built in a vernacular Gothic Revival style. It has a crenelated tower, and fourteen stained glass, Gothic-arched windows. The Church of the Immaculate Conception is a Catholic church, serving a congregation that was first organized in 1844. Their first dedicated church building was constructed in 1860, and in 1866 the congregation was reorganized as the Church of the Immaculate Conception. The current church building was begun in 1896, and completed in 1901. It is a fieldstone structure, vernacularly designed in an Early Gothic Revival style. The main entryway is created by three decorated, Gothic-arched portals with two squared towers at the corners.

Two municipal buildings are in the district: the Engine House and City Hall of Lapeer and the Lapeer Public Library. The Engine House and City Hall is a large, rectangular, two-story, Italianate-style brick structure built in 1882/83 with an elaborate cornice and second-floor windows which stretch upwards from a stone belt-course. The public library was established in 1880, and was first located in the courthouse. IN 1921, a Library Board was formed, and in 1923 a new library was constructed, based on a design from the Detroit architectural firm of Smith, Hinchman and Grylls. It is a symmetrical brick building with Georgian Revival influences, having a raised basement and a single story on top.
