= North Branch, Michigan =

- Village
- Village of North Branch
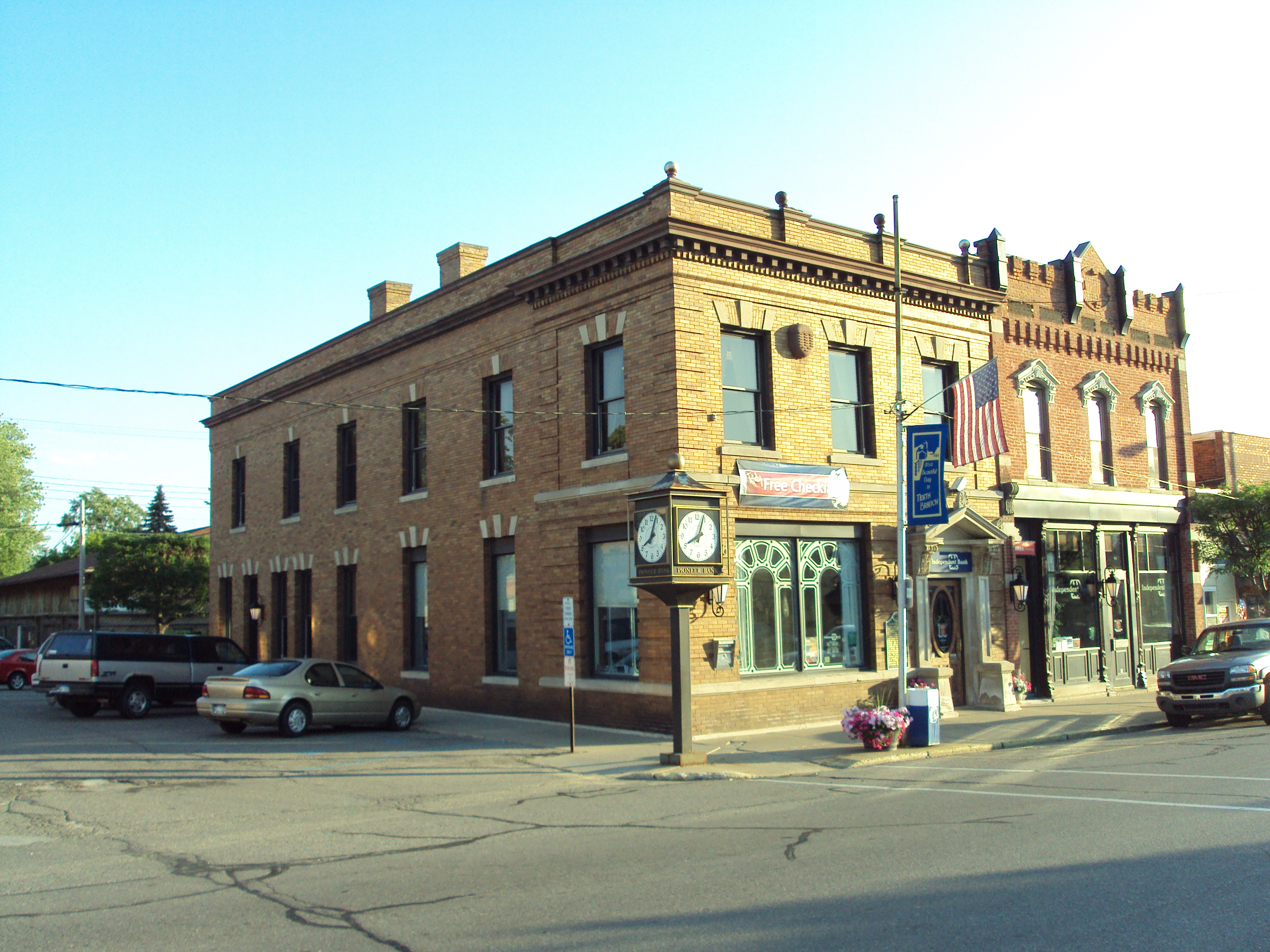
- The historic Pioneer State Bank No. 36

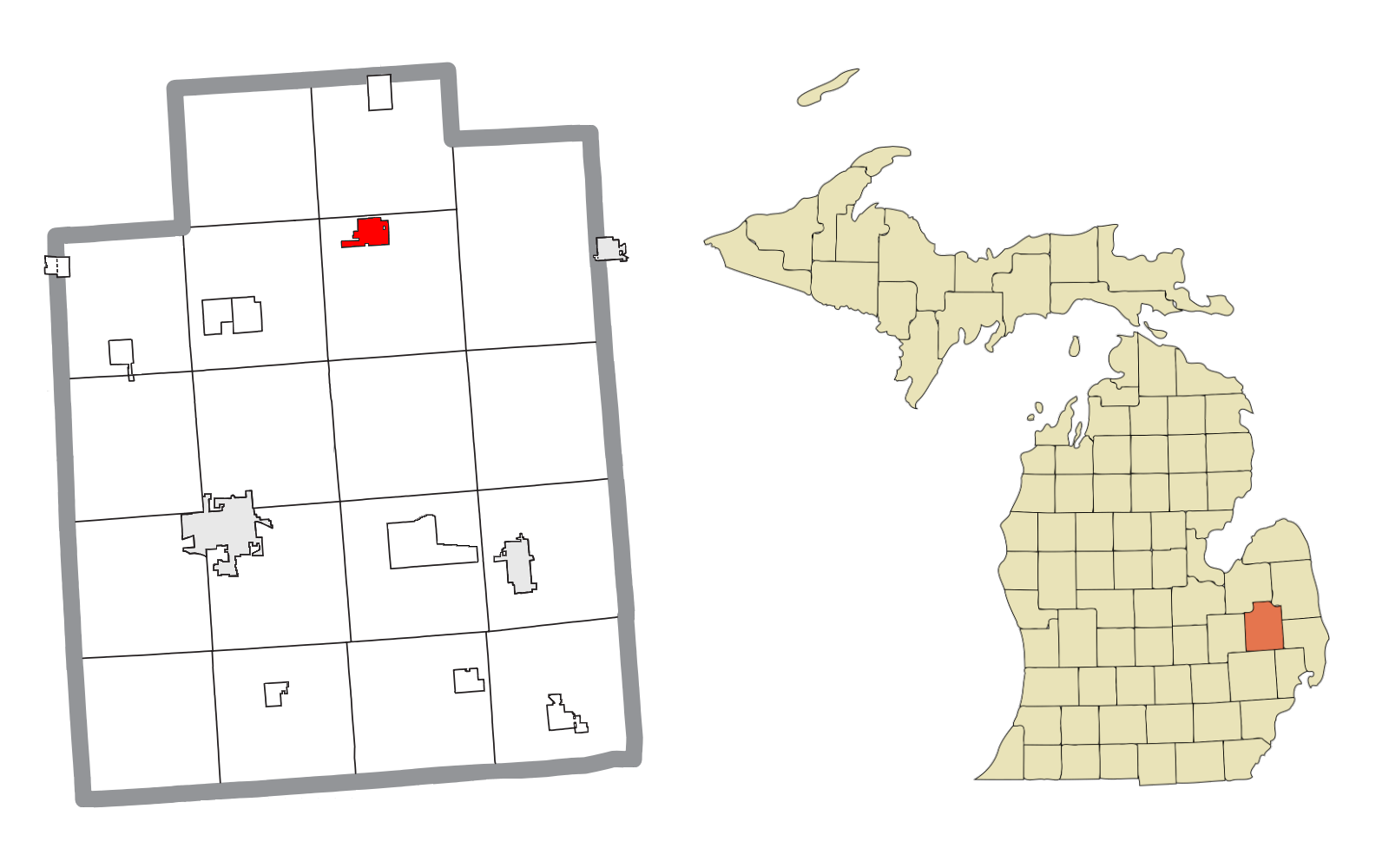
- Location within Lapeer County

- Location within the state of Michigan Location within the United States
- Coordinates: 43°13′47″N 83°11′30″W
- Country: United States
- State: Michigan
- County: Lapeer
- Township: North Branch
- Settled: 1856
- Incorporated: 1881

Government
  - Type: Village council
  - President: M. Kelly Martin
  - Clerk: Melissa Prouty

Area
  - Total: 1.44 sq mi (3.74 km^{2})
  - Land: 1.44 sq mi (3.74 km^{2})
  - Water: 0 sq mi (0.00 km^{2})
- Elevation: 814 ft (248 m)

Population (2020)
  - Total: 1,096
  - Density: 761.11/sq mi (293.87/km^{2})
- Time zone: UTC-5 (Eastern (EST))
  - Summer (DST): UTC-4 (EDT)
- ZIP code(s): 48461
- Area code: 810
- FIPS code: 26-58080
- GNIS feature ID: 0633486
- Website: Official website

North Branch is a village in Lapeer County in the U.S. state of Michigan. The population was 1,096 at the 2020 census. The village is located within North Branch Township.

== History ==
In 1854 the earliest settling of North Branch was undertaken. The founding fathers were Mr. and Mrs. Richard Beach and Mr. and Mrs. George Simmons. The nucleus of the village was the post office, store and trading post founded by John and Richard Beach. The Village was incorporated in 1881, and at the time, the population was 900. The town of North Branch sits on the north branch of the Flint River which flows through the township and is the principal waterway. The main thoroughfare is Huron Street. Two major fires mark the history of North Branch. The Great Michigan Fire in 1871 and the Thumb Fire in 1881 destroyed many parts of the town.

== Geography ==
According to the United States Census Bureau, the village has a total area of 1.33 square miles (3.44 km^{2}), all land.

== Demographics ==
Historical population
Census	Pop.	Note	%±
1890	705		—
1900	654		−7.2%
1910	717		9.6%
1920	645		−10.0%
1930	658		2.0%
1940	724		10.0%
1950	832		14.9%
1960	901		8.3%
1970	932		3.4%
1980	896		−3.9%
1990	1,023		14.2%
2000	1,027		0.4%
2010	1,033		0.6%
2020	1,096		6.1%
U.S. Decennial Census

=== 2010 census ===
As of the census of 2010, there were 1,033 people, 415 households, and 261 families residing in the village. The population density was 776.7 inhabitants per square mile (299.9/km^{2}). There were 484 housing units at an average density of 363.9 per square mile (140.5/km^{2}). The racial makeup of the village was 96.5% White, 0.2% African American, 0.2% Native American, 0.2% Asian, 0.2% Pacific Islander, 1.3% from other races, and 1.5% from two or more races. Hispanic or Latino of any race were 3.9% of the population.

There were 415 households, of which 34.9% had children under the age of 18 living with them, 39.0% were married couples living together, 16.6% had a female householder with no husband present, 7.2% had a male householder with no wife present, and 37.1% were non-families. 32.8% of all households were made up of individuals, and 14% had someone living alone who was 65 years of age or older. The average household size was 2.45 and the average family size was 3.07.

The median age in the village was 34 years. 27.7% of residents were under the age of 18; 8.8% were between the ages of 18 and 24; 26.1% were from 25 to 44; 23.5% were from 45 to 64; and 13.8% were 65 years of age or older. The gender makeup of the village was 46.0% male and 54.0% female.

=== 2000 census ===
As of the census of 2000, there were 1,027 people, 403 households, and 261 families residing in the village. The population density was 804.6 inhabitants per square mile (310.7/km^{2}). There were 431 housing units at an average density of 337.7 per square mile (130.4/km^{2}). The racial makeup of the village was 97.66% White, 0.19% African American, 0.29% Native American, 0.19% Asian, 0.39% from other races, and 1.27% from two or more races. Hispanic or Latino of any race were 2.24% of the population.

There were 403 households, out of which 34.7% had children under the age of 18 living with them, 43.4% were married couples living together, 15.1% had a female householder with no husband present, and 35.0% were non-families. 32.8% of all households were made up of individuals, and 18.4% had someone living alone who was 65 years of age or older. The average household size was 2.54 and the average family size was 3.18.

In the village, the population was spread out, with 29.2% under the age of 18, 11.5% from 18 to 24, 27.1% from 25 to 44, 17.3% from 45 to 64, and 14.9% who were 65 years of age or older. The median age was 31 years. For every 100 females, there were 85.7 males. For every 100 females age 18 and over, there were 81.8 males.

The median income for a household in the village was $31,071, and the median income for a family was $37,750. Males had a median income of $38,000 versus $24,028 for females. The per capita income for the village was $15,782. About 10.9% of families and 13.8% of the population were below the poverty line, including 18.0% of those under age 18 and 11.2% of those age 65 or over.
