= Younge site =

Archaeological site in Michigan, United States

- Younge Site (20LP3)
- U.S. National Register of Historic Places
- Michigan State Historic Site
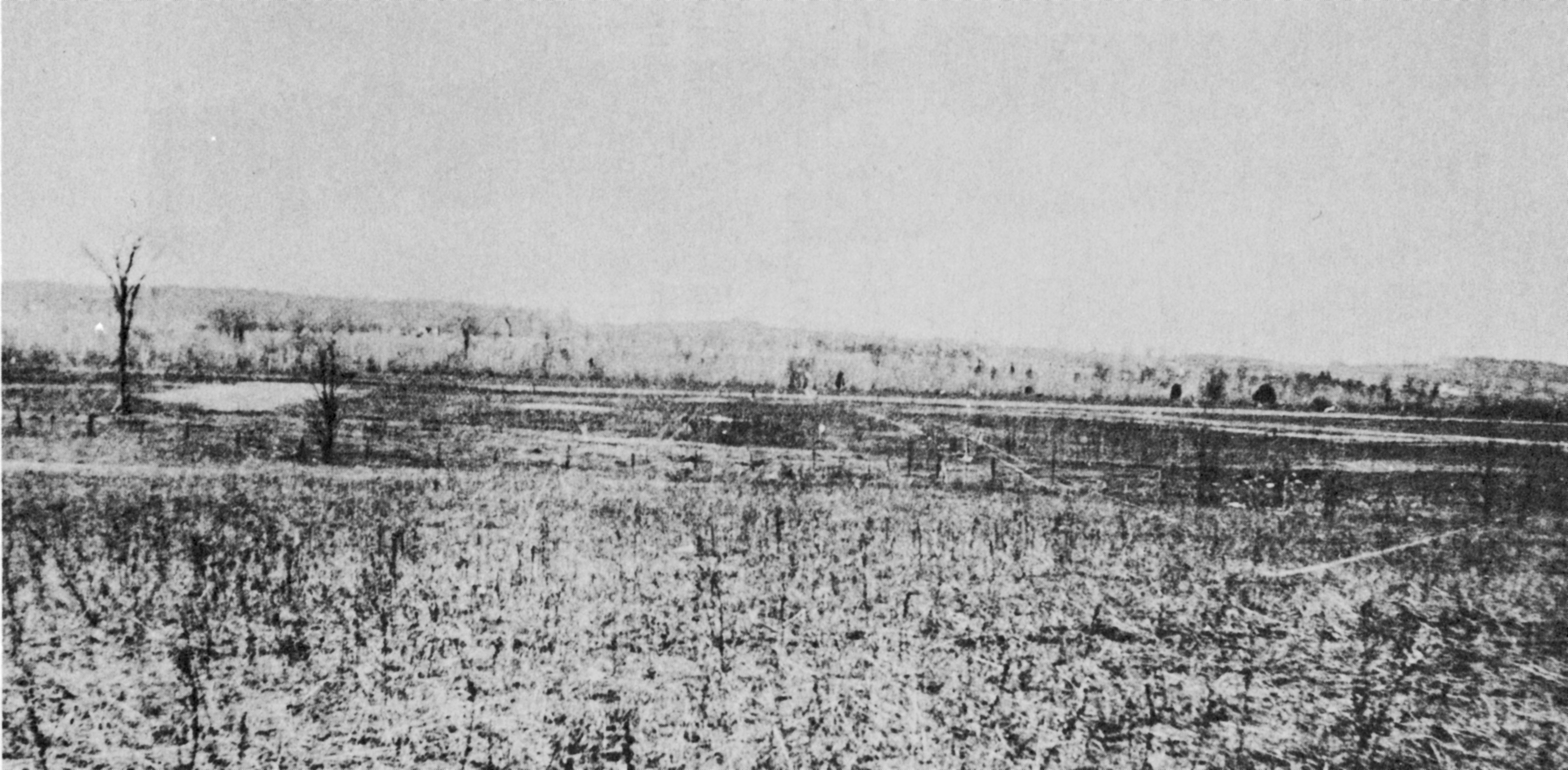
- Younge Site, c. 1936

- Location within Michigan Location within the United States
- Location: Goodland Township, Michigan
- Coordinates: 43°08′40″N 83°03′30″W
- Area: 3 acres (1.2 ha)
- NRHP reference No.: 76002161

Significant dates
- Added to NRHP: October 29, 1976
- Designated MSHS: October 29, 1971

The Younge Site is an archeological site located in Goodland Township, Lapeer County, Michigan. It is classified as a prehistoric Late Woodland site and was designated as a Michigan State Historic Site on October 29, 1971. It was added to the National Register of Historic Places on October 29, 1976.

== Description ==
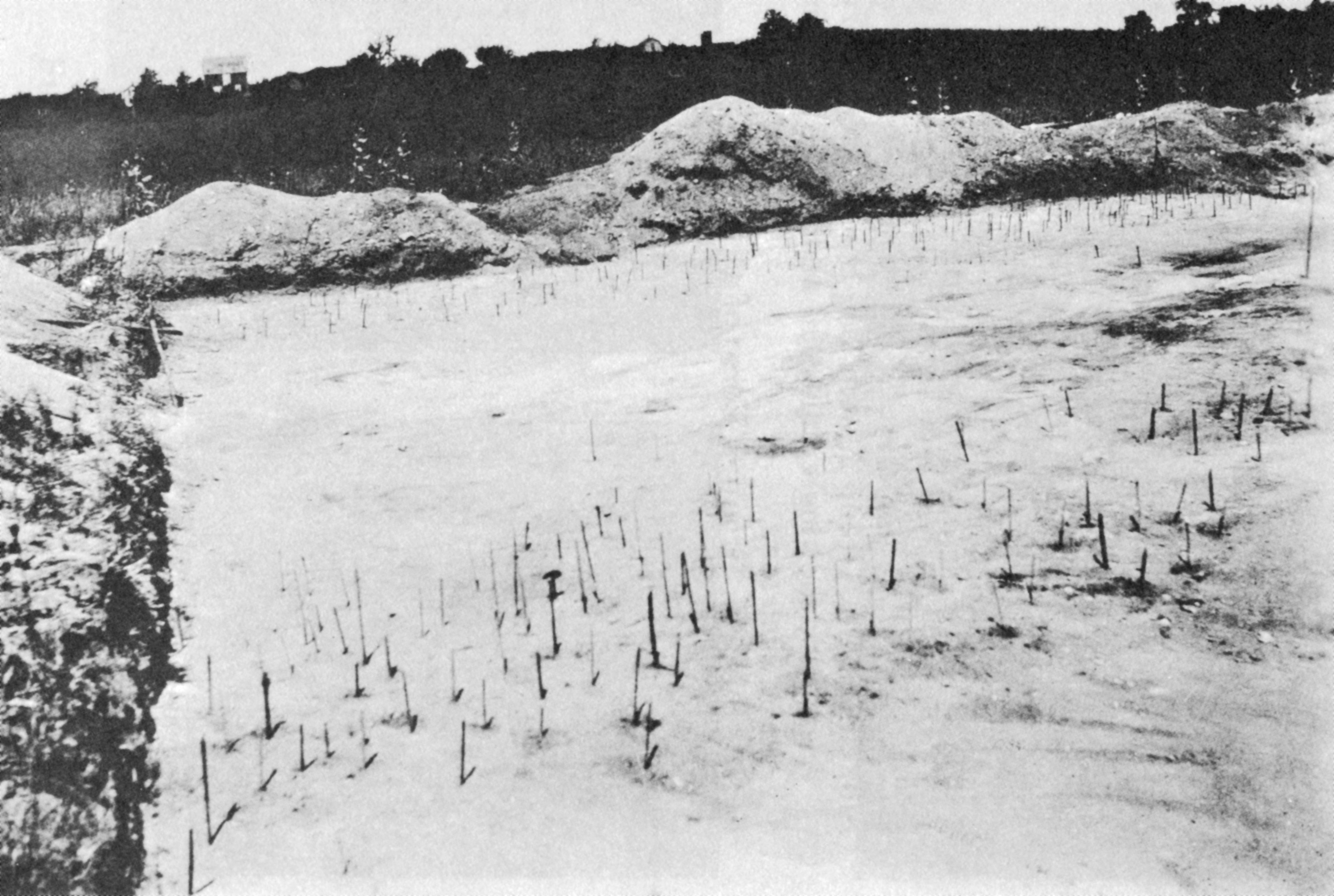
Excavation at site, of one enclosure, c. 1936

The Younge Site is located on a level plain about a mile wide, near Imlay Channel, a tributary of Mill Creek, which is a branch of the Black River, emptying into Lake Huron. The site itself spans about three acres, and contains remnants of two separate enclosures.

== History of archaeological investigations ==
A preliminary excavation of the site was completed in 1934 by W. B. Hinsdale. This proved promising, and more extensive excavations were completed the next year by Emerson Greenman of the University of Michigan.

Almost thirty years later, James Fitting did a pottery typology and Late Woodland cultural chronology for southeast Michigan based on findings at Younge and other sites.

== Results of 1934-1935 excavations ==
The remains of two enclosures were found, each made from poles set into the ground. One was about 585 feet long and 25–30 feet wide. The second was 252 feet long and 25 to 30 feet wide. Both contained human burials, pit features and fireplaces, plant and animal remains, and prehistoric artifacts dating to the Late Woodland period.

=== Features ===
88 pits were excavated along with several fireplaces. Three of the pits contained the remains of maize.

=== Burials ===
Thirty-seven burials were excavated at the site. Some of them had grave goods and/or modifications to the skeleton which may have cultural significance:

- 1 had a tobacco pipe
- 2 had mussel shell included
- 1 had red ochre
- 1 had a celt
- Some of the crania had drilled perforations (2) or removal of circular discs from the cranium (7)
- 5 had clay in the facial cavities
- On some specimens, the leg bones were also modified to support the body when suspended from a pole in an ossuary, which was observed—although not firsthand—in the accounts of the earliest European settlers.

Based on the locations of burials within enclosures, and the presence of grave goods with some of the skeletons, it was suggested that the structures were part of a burial ceremony similar to those observed in the Huron tribe in early Historic times (i.e. the Huron Feast of the Dead).

=== Animal remains ===
Remains from several species were found in the pits or in the topsoil. They were not quantified in the site report but the main species present were beaver, marten, red fox, muskrat, wild turkey, walleyed pike, largemouth black bass and several species of mussel. These remains were not modified into tools like the bone tools described in the Artifacts section below, and may be considered food remains.

=== Plant remains ===
Plant remains were not systematically collected in the excavations. However, the remains of maize were recovered from 3 of the pits, indicating agriculture was practiced at the site.

=== Artifacts ===
Artifacts recovered from the site included:

- Pottery (1,500 sherds) – described in detail below
- Stone tools – including projectile points, scrapers, blanks and flakes. It was suggested that the stone and bone tools were underrepresented at Younge when compared to the amount of pottery present. The most numerous category of projectile points was the small triangular point, or Madison point. This artifact type, also known as "arrowheads", are thought to be arrow-tips for bows-and-arrows. The usage of the bow-and-arrow seems to have greatly increased during the Late Woodland, probably as a result of increased conflict.
- Ground stone artifacts – including pitted stones, abrading stones, a net-sinker and a celt
- Bone tools – only 2 pieces of worked bone were present; one was interpreted as an awl and the other, a chisel
- Tobacco pipes – 2 complete and 47 fragments

=== Late Woodland pottery ===
Archaeologists often find pottery to be a useful tool in analyzing a prehistoric culture. It is usually plentiful at a site and the details of manufacture and decoration are useful indicators of time, space and culture.

No whole or completely reconstructable vessels were found at the site. Therefore, the researchers looked primarily at rim sherds and distinctive body sherds to analyze the pottery.

The pottery was all grit-tempered, Late Woodland ware. Most had a cord-wrapped paddle impressed finish, sometimes partially smoothed over.

Almost all sherds had some form of decoration. Several types of decorative motifs were identified:

- Impression with 2-ply cord, i.e. a linear cord impression; often in association with a flat lip top
- Impression with cord-wrapped stick
- Incision with a sharp tool
- Punctates in parallel rows forming a checkered pattern; often in association with collared rims and outsloping lip tops

Fitting developed the concept of the Younge tradition (also known as the Western Basin tradition) to interpret a long, in situ occupational sequence in southeast Michigan and the western Lake Erie basin that some believe goes from as far back as the late Archaic Period (c. B.C. 3000) and continues to the Late Woodland Period (c. A.D. 1400).

The Late Woodland portion of the sequence is as follows: Riviere au Vase phase (c. A.D. 800–1000), Younge phase (c. A.D. 1000–1200), the Springwells phase (c. A.D. 1200–1350) and the Wolf phase (c. A.D. 1350–1450).

The Younge phase is named after the Younge site, which is the first site where pottery of this phase was excavated.

Fitting classified the Younge pottery into 4 types. All of these types are part of the Late Woodland ware group Riviere Ware and all are grit-tempered:

- Vase Dentate – 7 vessels identified at Younge. Characterized by large globular vessels with cordmarked or fabric-wrapped paddle impressed surface finish; decorated with oblique, vertical or herringbone impressions along the rim, made with a dentate stamp or comb. Collared rims are common, but castellations are rare; lip top is flat and slopes outward and the rim profile is vertical to slightly excurved. This type was also common at the Riviere au Vase site, in Macomb County, Michigan.
- Vase Tool-impressed – 5 vessels identified at Younge. Similar to Vase Dentate except castellations are more common. Form is rounded to semiconoidal. This type was also numerous at the Riviere au Vase site and the Fort Wayne Mound site just south of Detroit, Michigan.
- Vase Corded – 11 vessels identified at Younge. Similar to Vase Dentate and Vase Tool-impressed except the vessel form is more elongated and rims are mostly castellated, and sometimes also collared. Present at the Riviere au Vase and Fort Wayne Mound sites and also the Wolf site, which is located about 4 miles northeast of Riviere au Vase.
- Macomb Linear – 8 vessels identified at Younge. Characterized by elongated vessels with rounded to semiconoidal bases; constricted necks and slightly excurved rim profiles; castellated rims which are sometimes collared; and roughened or smoothed over cordmarked or fabric-impressed surface. Design motifs include horizontal impressions and triangles forming lines parallel to the base of the collar, or following the castellations. This type was also common at the Riviere au Vase, Fort Wayne Mound and Wolf sites.

According to Fitting, judging by the trends in pottery styles within the Younge tradition, the Younge and Riviere au Vase sites are very similar in time placement. Both have Riviere Ware pottery but Riviere au Vase also has an earlier type of pottery called Wayne Ware, and that type is absent at Younge. Therefore, the Younge occupation is slightly later than the one at Riviere au Vase.

The Younge phase roughly coincides with the Glen Meyer and Pickering Early Ontario Iroquois tradition in Canada, and the Owasco (pre-Iroquois) phase in New York State. It has been suggested, based on certain similarities in pottery styles, that they are all related and therefore the Younge tradition peoples may have been speakers of an Iroquoian language. Greenman points out the similarities between the artifacts found at Younge and the artifacts from the Uren site, a Proto-Neutral Ontario Iroquois site in Canada.

== Significance ==
The Younge Site was one of the first sites to be excavated in southeastern Michigan and is the type site for the Younge tradition. The presence of maize indicates the Late Woodland cultures of the area had an agricultural base. Also, the burials present at the site illustrate some of the mortuary customs from this period.
