= Samuel J. Tomlinson House =

- U.S. National Register of Historic Places
- Michigan State Historic Site
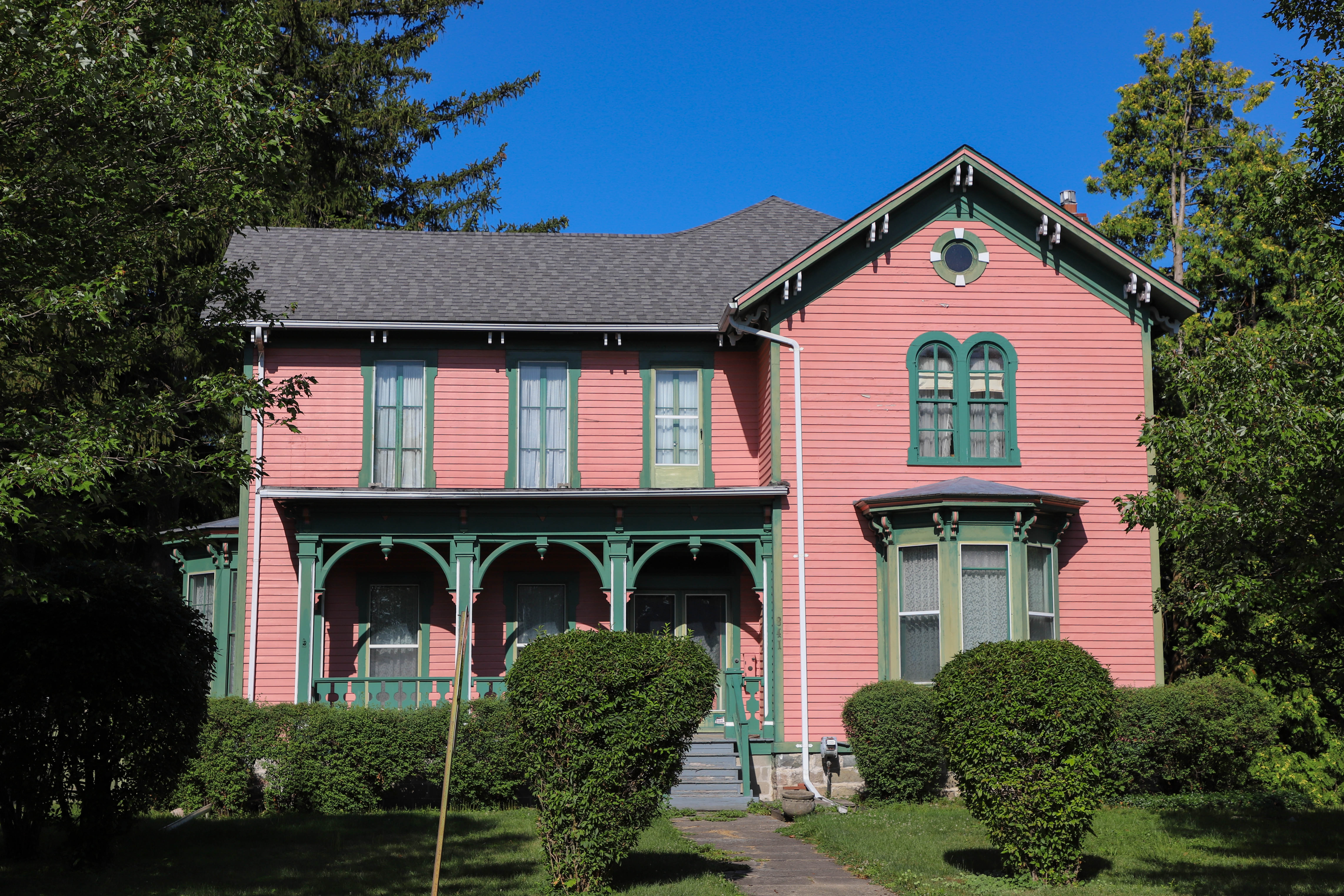
- Interactive map
- Location: 841 Calhoun St., Lapeer, Michigan
- Coordinates: 43°03′26″N 83°18′55″W
- Area: less than one acre
- Built: c. 1870
- Architectural style: Italianate
- MPS: Lapeer MRA
- NRHP reference No.: 85001632
- Added to NRHP: July 26, 1985

The Samuel J. Tomlinson House is a single family home located at 841 Calhoun Street in Lapeer, Michigan. It was listed on the National Register of Historic Places in 1985.

== History ==
In 1869, this property was purchased by S. J. Tomlinson, who was at the time the city clerk and the editor of the local paper, the Lapeer Clarion. Tomlinson likely constructed this house in the early 1870s. In 1880, Tomlinson moved from here to the Peter Van Dyke House. The Tomlinson House went through multiple owners until 1888, when it was transferred to C.W. Laing, who purchased it for his aging parents, David Nicholson Laing and Anne Ward Laing. Laing was an architect from Chicago, and likely added the porte cochere and made other interior modifications to the house. C.W. Laing's sister married a Vosburgh, and the structure remained in the hands of their family until 1966.

== Description ==
The Tomlinson House is a two-story, L-shaped Italianate wood-framed house clad in clapboard on a stone foundation. It is similar in size and massing as the nearby John and Rosetta Lee House. The front facade has a first floor bay window and paired and rounded-arch windows on the second floor, along with paired brackets along the roofline. A front porch is supported by chamfered wooden posts with arches.
