= Columbus Tuttle House =

- U.S. National Register of Historic Places
- Michigan State Historic Site
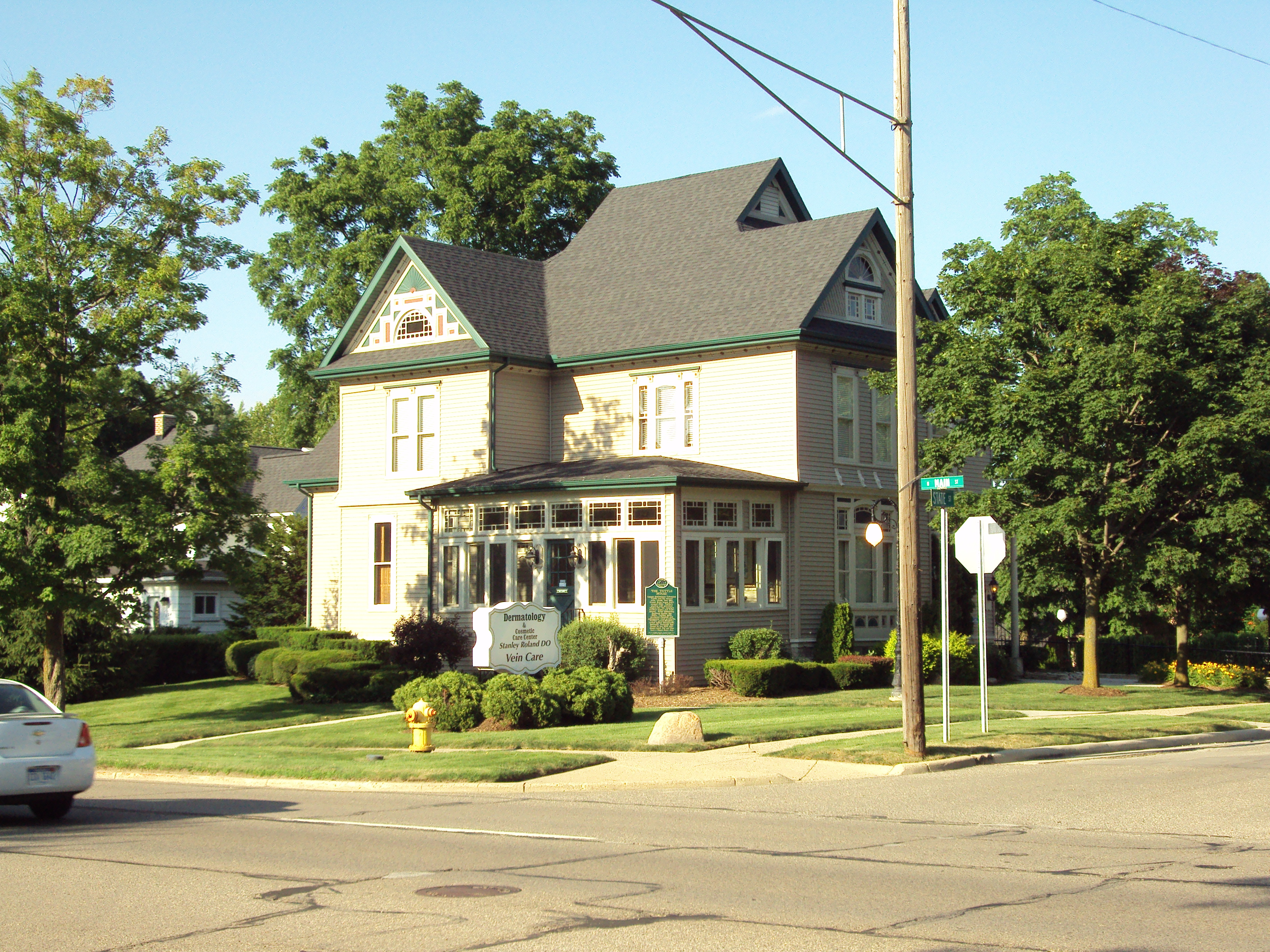

- Location within Michigan Location within the United States
- Interactive map
- Location: 610 N. Main St., Lapeer, Michigan
- Coordinates: 43°03′18″N 83°19′07″W
- Area: less than one acre
- Built: 1890
- Built by: Daniel Wadsworth
- Architectural style: Queen Anne
- MPS: Lapeer MRA
- NRHP reference No.: 85001633
- Added to NRHP: July 26, 1985

The Columbus Tuttle House is a single-family home, now converted to a medical office, located at 610 N. Main Street in Lapeer, Michigan. It was listed on the National Register of Historic Places in 1985.

== History ==
Columbus Tuttle arrived in Lapeer in 1853, and soon after constructed a house at this location. He founded a planing mill in Lapeer some time before 1860. The mill originally served the local market, but as Lapeer grew and the railroads were built through, Tuttle expanded to supply a wider market. As the lumber industry dwindled in the 1880s, Tuttle retooled his mill and began to produce finished and ornamental products. In 1890, Tuttle decided to construct a new home on this lot, and hired Daniel Wadsworth to build this house. Tuttle lived here until his death, after which the house was owned by Frank R. Cutting, another local lumberman. In 1948, the house was converted to doctor's offices.

== Description ==
The Columbus Tuttle House is a wooden Queen Anne structure with irregular massing on a stone foundation. It has multiple gables, and an exterior ornamented with sunburst panels, decorative shingling, fanlights, and stepped windows. The front facade has a slightly projecting bay; a porch, enclosed in 1905, abuts the projecting bay. The enclosure is detailed with transoms containing small colored panes.
