= Dryden, Michigan =

- Village
- Village of Dryden
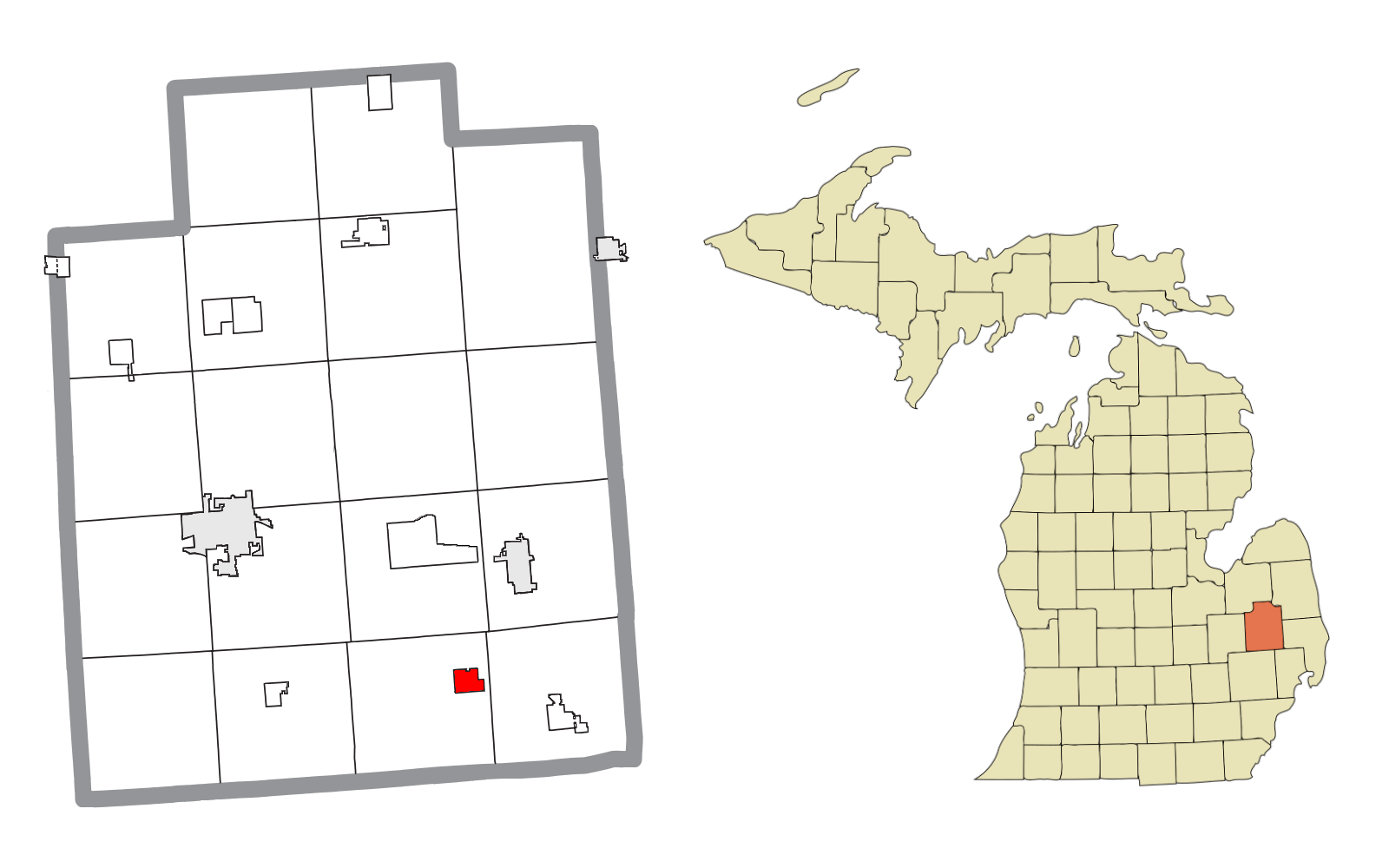
- Location within Lapeer County

- Location within the state of Michigan Location within the United States
- Coordinates: 42°56′47″N 83°07′33″W
- Country: United States
- State: Michigan
- County: Lapeer
- Township: Dryden
- Settled: 1836
- Incorporated: 1887

Government
  - Type: Village council
  - President: Alen Graham
  - Clerk: Holly Shroyer

Area
  - Total: 1.10 sq mi (2.85 km^{2})
  - Land: 1.10 sq mi (2.85 km^{2})
  - Water: 0 sq mi (0.00 km^{2})
- Elevation: 935 ft (285 m)

Population (2020)
  - Total: 1,023
  - Density: 930/sq mi (360/km^{2})
- Time zone: UTC-5 (Eastern (EST))
  - Summer (DST): UTC-4 (EDT)
- ZIP code(s): 48428
- Area code: 810
- FIPS code: 26-23140
- GNIS feature ID: 0624906
- Website: Official website

Dryden is a village in Lapeer County in the U.S. state of Michigan. The population was 1,023 at the 2020 census. The village is located within Dryden Township.

== History ==
The Village of Dryden was settled in 1836 and was called Amboy. It was located 1 mile North of its present-day located at Dryden and Mill Roads. In 1837, then known as Lomond, held its first town meeting since settling the previous year. A store was built here as early as 1840 by Mr. Johnathan Sweet who owned most of the land. It was known as Lamb's Corners in homage to the man who bought the land from Mr. Sweet, John M. Lamb, starting in 1846 and the named stayed for several years. The name Dryden for its village was eventually picked and it was to pay honor to the poet, John Dryden. The 1840s was the decade in which many businesses were first established in the village. It was incorporated as a village in 1887.

== Education ==
Dryden has two schools. Dryden Elementary for Preschool through 6th grade and Dryden Jr./Sr. High School for 7th through 12th grade. Additionally there is the Dryden Township Library.

== Geography ==
According to the United States Census Bureau, the village has a total area of 1.10 square miles (2.85 km^{2}), all land.

== Demographics ==
Historical population
Census	Pop.	Note	%±
1880	200		—
1890	322		61.0%
1900	328		1.9%
1910	371		13.1%
1920	359		−3.2%
1930	383		6.7%
1940	411		7.3%
1950	476		15.8%
1960	531		11.6%
1970	654		23.2%
1980	650		−0.6%
1990	628		−3.4%
2000	815		29.8%
2010	951		16.7%
2020	1,023		7.6%
U.S. Decennial Census

=== 2010 census ===
As of the census of 2010, there were 951 people, 368 households, and 260 families living in the village. The population density was 864.5 inhabitants per square mile (333.8/km^{2}). There were 387 housing units at an average density of 351.8 per square mile (135.8/km^{2}). The racial makeup of the village was 98.0% White, 0.4% Native American, 0.2% Asian, 0.3% from other races, and 1.1% from two or more races. Hispanic or Latino of any race were 1.1% of the population.

There were 368 households, of which 35.1% had children under the age of 18 living with them, 54.3% were married couples living together, 10.9% had a female householder with no husband present, 5.4% had a male householder with no wife present, and 29.3% were non-families. 23.9% of all households were made up of individuals, and 5.5% had someone living alone who was 65 years of age or older. The average household size was 2.57 and the average family size was 3.06.

The median age in the village was 38.6 years. 27.1% of residents were under the age of 18; 7.2% were between the ages of 18 and 24; 26.1% were from 25 to 44; 27.2% were from 45 to 64; and 12.2% were 65 years of age or older. The gender makeup of the village was 49.8% male and 50.2% female.

=== 2000 census ===
As of the census of 2000, there were 815 people, 285 households, and 224 families living in the village. The population density was 727.8 inhabitants per square mile (281.0/km^{2}). There were 312 housing units at an average density of 278.6 per square mile (107.6/km^{2}). The racial makeup of the village was 97.42% White, 0.74% Native American, 0.25% Asian, 0.49% from other races, and 1.10% from two or more races. Hispanic or Latino of any race were 1.23% of the population.

There were 285 households, out of which 42.8% had children under the age of 18 living with them, 64.2% were married couples living together, 8.8% had a female householder with no husband present, and 21.1% were non-families. 16.1% of all households were made up of individuals, and 4.2% had someone living alone who was 65 years of age or older. The average household size was 2.80 and the average family size was 3.10.

In the village, the population was spread out, with 29.1% under the age of 18, 6.7% from 18 to 24, 33.4% from 25 to 44, 21.5% from 45 to 64, and 9.3% who were 65 years of age or older. The median age was 33 years. For every 100 females, there were 105.3 males. For every 100 females age 18 and over, there were 105.0 males.

The median income for a household in the village was $54,375, and the median income for a family was $57,639. Males had a median income of $39,226 versus $22,115 for females. The per capita income for the village was $21,180. About 2.3% of families and 5.7% of the population were below the poverty line, including 5.5% of those under age 18 and 7.1% of those age 65 or over.

== Economy ==
Dryden holds the distinction of being the original home of Champion Homes (1953), whose approximately 150 employees who produced manufactured housing and recreational vehicles until relocating in the 1980s.

== Notable people ==
- George Owen Squier, major general in the United States Army; founded Muzak.
- Paul Mitchell (politician), former member of the United States House of Representatives
- Katie Hettinger, late model and NASCAR driver.
