= John W. Day House =

Historic house in Michigan, United States

- U.S. National Register of Historic Places
- Michigan State Historic Site
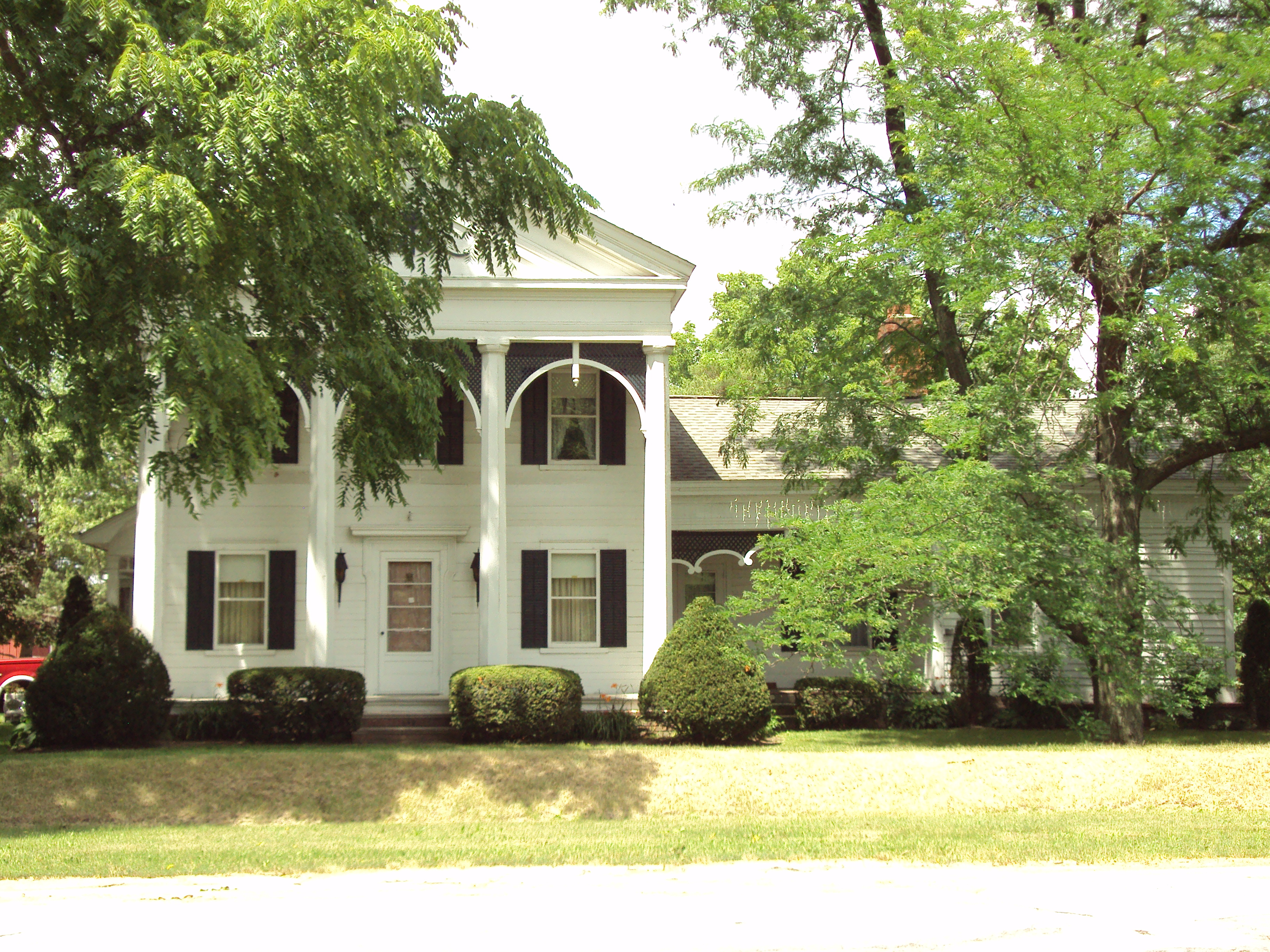

- Location within Michigan Location within the United States
- Interactive map
- Location: 4985 Dryden Road; Dryden Township, Michigan
- Coordinates: 42°56′44″N 83°08′43″W
- Built: 1863
- Architectural style: Greek Revival
- NRHP reference No.: 87002153

Significant dates
- Added to NRHP: December 17, 1987
- Designated MSHS: September 26, 1987

The John W. Day House, also known as the Day-Dittman House, is a private residential structure located at 4985 Dryden Road in Dryden Township in southern Lapeer County, Michigan, United States. It was designated as a Michigan State Historic Site on September 26, 1987, and soon after added to the National Register of Historic Places on December 17, 1987.

== History ==
John W. Day was born in 1810 to Erastus and Lucy Day in Otsego County, New York. Erastus and Lucy Day moved to Macomb County, Michigan in 1826, leaving John in New York. In 1836, John Day purchased this property and began farming. In 1837 he married Polly Parkhurst; the couple has six children, four of whom lived to adulthood. In 1863, Day built this house. In 1879, the Day family sold the house to Prussian immigrant Augustus Dittman and his wife Maria Kohler. August died in 1898 and Maria in 1901, after which the house went to their son William. William live dthere and farmed the property until his death in 1956. The house remained in his family until 1970 until it was sold once again. (Note. The house was not sold by the Dittman family in 1970. It was not sold until after the death of William J. Dittman, who passed in 1973.)

== Description ==
Built in 1863 in the style of Greek Revival architecture, the structure is a wood framed, two-story house with a portico, pediment, and rounded latticework linking the four hexagonal columns of the portico. A 1½-story addition was built along the entire right side of the house in 1880, extending the length of the structure and adding a large room. Since then, the structure has remained largely intact, except for an arcade and porch added to the back in 1974. The house is clad with Flush-board siding, and has a center door with molded enframement. A recessed porch on the ell contains a secondary entrance door.
