= 2012 Dexter tornado =

Damaging tornado in Michigan in 2012

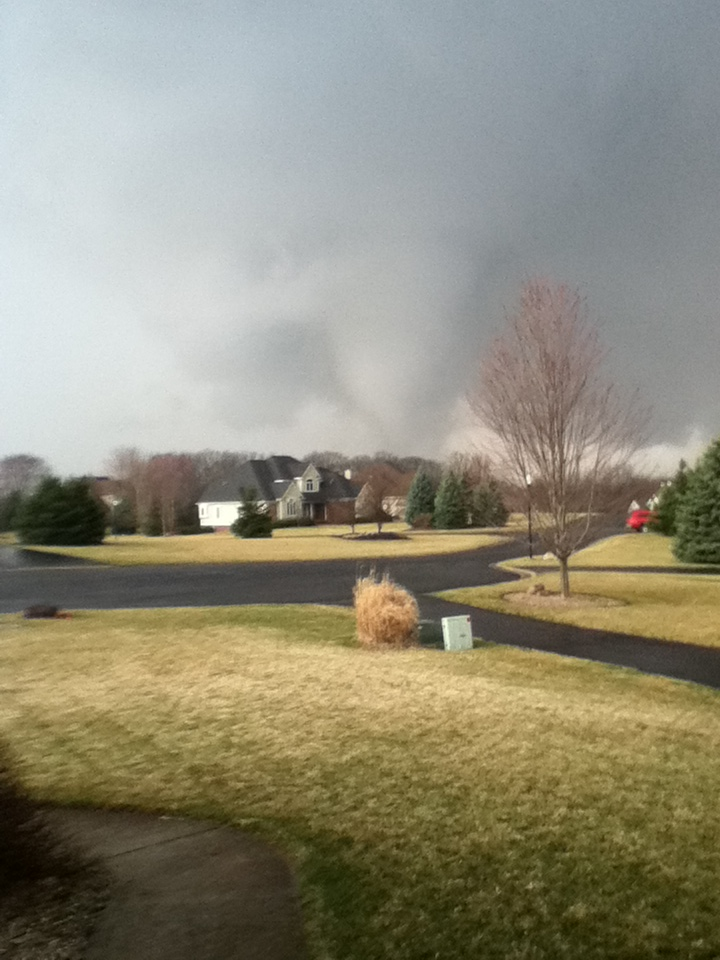
- Clockwise from top: A photograph of the tornado near the Brass Creek subdivision in eastern Dexter; a detailed path map of the tornado with outlined intensity contours; NEXRAD reflectivity imagery of the tornado, as seen from the KDTX station in White Lake Township, Michigan

Meteorological history
- Formed: March 15, 2012; 5:18 p.m. EDT (UTC–04:00)
- Dissipated: March 15, 2012; 5:56 p.m. EDT (UTC–04:00)
- Duration: 38 minutes

EF3 tornado
- on the Enhanced Fujita scale
- Max width: 800 yd (730 m)
- Path length: 7.6 mi (12.2 km)
- Highest winds: 135–140 mph (217–225 km/h)

Overall effects
- Fatalities: 0
- Injuries: 0
- Damage: $12 million (2012 USD)
- Areas affected: Washtenaw County, Michigan; particularly Dexter
- Part of the Tornadoes of 2012

During the late afternoon hours of March 15, 2012, a destructive EF3 tornado produced a damage path 7.6 mi (12.2 km) long throughout Washtenaw County, Michigan, extending from Hudson Mills to Scio Township. Along this path, the town of Dexter, Michigan, was particularly affected, where EF3-level damage was observed in the northwestern portion of town along Dexter-Pinckney Road. EF3 damage was also documented in the Huron Farms subdivision in southeastern Dexter, where homes were destroyed at winds estimated up to 135–140 mph (217–225 km/h).

The Dexter tornado, as it is commonly referred to in both news sources and official reports, did not result in any injuries or deaths; however, it caused approximately $12 million (2012 USD) in damage costs. (Note: All monetary values are in terms of 2012 USD, unless otherwise noted.) The tornado maintained an average width of 400 yd (370 m) for much of its 38-minute duration, reaching an overall maximum width of 800 yd (730 m). Several reports make mention of the slow-moving nature of the tornado, with the National Weather Service in Detroit/Pontiac remarking that the tornado was, at some points, nearly "stationary".

The Dexter tornado was the most recent tornado in the state of Michigan to be rated EF3 or higher, until a similarly devastating and costly EF3 tornado impacted Gaylord, slightly over a decade later. As of present, it is the third-most-recent tornado of estimated EF3 strength in Michigan, behind the previously-mentioned Gaylord tornado and the 2026 Union City tornado.

== Meteorological synopsis ==
At 06:00 UTC on March 15, 2012, the Storm Prediction Center (SPC) issued a TSTM risk for the Great Lakes region, with a slight risk for damaging winds and hail centered in the Lower Ohio Valley region. It was noted that numerous thunderstorms, some elevated, were developing in a warm air advection regime, (Note: A warm advection regime is an area (regime) of cooler air, into which warm air has been advected, thus increasing warmth and instability.) located in the Upper-Mid Mississippi Valley and the Great Lakes region. Later in the evening, the main storm activity was expected to shift eastward, with the primary concern being severe hail. Some storms were expected to fire off of a stationary front, where CAPE values would reach or exceed 1500–2000 J/kg. "Sufficient" lapse rates for severe weather formation were also anticipated.

A velocity scan of the Dexter tornado, as it was producing its first instance of EF3 damage

By 20:00 UTC, the area encompassed by the slight risk had extended to Southeast Michigan and The Thumb region, with the primary threat being a 15% probability of large and damaging hail within 25 mi (40 km) of a point. (Note: The Storm Prediction Center (SPC) issues risks based on the probability of severe weather occurring within 25 mi (40 km) of a given point, not the probability of severe weather occurring in that location alone.) The SPC noted that unusually high moisture values and "meager" mid-level shear would support the development of a nonstandard mid-March thunderstorm event in the following hours. Relatively weak southwesterly mid-level flow was observed over much of the contiguous United States at this time. A large band of 10–30 kt winds was also observed extending from the Southwestern United States to the New England region, atop the flow of a high-pressure system over the Southeast.

== Tornado summary ==
The Dexter tornado officially made contact with the ground at 5:18 p.m. EDT, (Note: All specified times are in terms of EDT, unless otherwise noted.) northeast of the intersection of North Territorial Road and Dexter Townhall Road in the unincorporated community of Hudson Mills. The tornado slowly proceeded to the southeast, uprooting trees and producing minor roof damage at EF1 intensity. As the tornado approached the Horseshoe Bend subdivision along Dexter-Pinckney Road, it strengthened to EF2 intensity, causing damage to the facades of several residences with winds estimated at 120 mph (190 km/h). The Hudson Mills Metropark golf course also sustained severe damage, with trees and residential debris being strewn around the course. The most intense damage was observed around holes 13 and 14, where numerous trees were "scattered every which way". Branches were found driven into sod.

A collapsed home in the Huron Farms subdivision, following the tornado

Continuing to parallel Dexter-Pinckney Road, the tornado intensified further, causing its first instance of EF3 damage in the northwestern fringes of Dexter at 5:31 p.m. One home was destroyed by estimated winds of 135–140 mph (217–225 km/h). The tornado then became stationary in its movement for five minutes before deviating to the east and entering the center of Dexter. It maintained EF2 intensity as it moved along the Huron River, coming into the limits of the Huron Farms subdivision at 5:49 p.m. Here, the tornado re-intensified and again reached EF3 strength, where winds were estimated at 135–140 mph (217–225 km/h) based on the destruction of several homes, including one that was fully removed from its foundation and another that sustained the collapse of its exterior walls. The Dexter tornado then exhibited a rapid weakening trend, continuing to translate to the southeast and eventually lifting at 5:56 p.m., near the intersection of Zeeb Road and Ann Arbor-Dexter Road.

With surveyors classifying the Dexter tornado as an EF3, it would remain the most recent EF3 tornado in the state of Michigan until May 20, 2022, when a similarly thin and destructive tornado impacted Gaylord in Otsego County. In March of 2026, a deadly EF3 tornado struck Union City, solidifying the Dexter tornado as the third-most-recent EF3 tornado to occur in Michigan. The Union City tornado became the earliest-season EF3 tornado in the state, surpassing the record that the Dexter tornado had previously set.

== Aftermath ==
=== Immediate aftermath ===
An aerial view of the tornado-damaged Huron Farms subdivision in southeastern Dexter

The Dexter tornado was the first tornado of such magnitude to impact Washtenaw County since 1982. Immediately following the tornado, several organizations and institutions, including the Michigan State Police, the Statewide Disaster Restoration Mobile Command Center, firefighters, and deputies, arrived at affected areas to perform search and rescue. Police officials closed all roads in the path of the tornado and performed door-to-door search operations. The Red Cross and mobile trauma units were also deployed, where they remained on site in order to tend to emerging victims; members of the Red Cross Disaster Team also began assessing damaged areas the morning after the tornado. Though several responders, units, and witnesses expected the tornado to have associated injuries or even deaths due to its strength and impact, none ever surfaced. Officials attributed this to advanced, well-developed storm spotter networks and the double activation of emergency sirens in the Dexter area. Despite the lack of associated casualties, Emergency Management Director Mac Breckenridge recalled that "the Dexter tornado was the most immediately potentially life-threatening disaster that Washtenaw County experienced" in his 25 years as director.

A panoramic of Dexter-Pinckney Road, via an NWS survey of the area

Aaron Berkholz, the Washtenaw County Road Commission (WCRC) superintendent of maintenance, directed crews through headlight, as the Dexter tornado had cut power in the immediate area. Trees were sawed through by these crews on Dexter-Pinckney Road in order to reach the Carriage Hills subdivision, which had sustained a direct hit by the tornado. Preliminary damage cost estimates were marked at $10 million, and official figures were finalized at $12 million in the days following the tornado. The day after the tornado, 4,000 homes in Washtenaw County were reported without power, especially in the immediate vicinity of Dexter.

=== Recovery efforts ===
The reported number of damaged homes varies from a range of approximately 100 to more than 250; an estimated 13 were destroyed. In the Huron Farms subdivision, at least two dozen homes were deemed unlivable due to the damage that they sustained from the tornado. The Statewide Disaster Restoration organization in Southfield, Michigan, provided 31 separate emergency services to homeowners affected by the tornado, including household reparations and clearing out water damage. The Huron Farms subdivision was lit up with generator-powered spotlights in order to prevent looting. Downed trees and power lines produced fires and floods throughout the affected areas, requiring attention from responders. Gas leaks were also reported. Multiple victims applied for insurance and were assisted.

A scene of destruction in Dexter

By March 16, the Dexter Lions, a community service group centered in Dexter, had raised $15,000 in relief money, which was efficiently distributed to victims in the form of $250 gift cards. $200,000 was allocated by Dexter Township officials for reparations after the tornado, though a state of emergency was never declared, preventing the allotment of further funds. A makeshift lost-and-found site was established at the Creekside Intermediate School, and volunteers worked on recovering items from damaged residences and facilitating cleanup efforts. The Mill Creek Middle School in Dexter was also fashioned into a makeshift shelter in the evening following the tornado.

Operation BBQ Relief, a non-profit organization based in Missouri, set up a station in front of the LaFontaine Chevrolet dealer in downtown Dexter, less than a day after the tornado. Within 24 hours, the organization provided nearly 1,000 meals as part of the relief effort in Dexter. The volunteers in this organization planned to allocate any remaining food and materials to the Salvation Army. Additionally, according to the Dexter Relief Fund website, the LaFontaine Automotive Group accumulated over $4,200 in donations by Saturday afternoon, March 17. Busch's Fresh Food Market supplied hundreds of pounds of food to those in need and received over $10,000 in donations, all of which was directed towards the relief effort.

The Monday after the tornado, Mill Creek Middle School, which had served as a temporary shelter, resumed its schedule as normal. Several of the bus routes of the children who attended Mill Creek went through the damage path of the Dexter tornado, exposing students to the damage that the tornado had caused. Five members of the district's crisis team were assigned to ride with the children, with the purpose of helping them start conversations and process their emotions. The staff of Mill Creek Middle School prioritized the needs of the children throughout the following week, allowing them to recount their experiences of the tornado. At other schools, additional counselors were sent to help students recover.

=== Legacy ===
An aerial view of numerous damaged or swept homes in Dexter

After the occurrence of the Dexter tornado, the number of county-controlled emergency sirens experienced a significant increase from 39 to 88, with Dexter, Dexter Township, Scio Township, and Ann Arbor investing in these sirens. Many of these installations were in direct response to the Dexter tornado. The efforts of the Washtenaw County Road Commission in clearing away damaged trees resulted in the removal of nearly 6,000 cubic yards of wood chips, mainly along Dexter-Pinckney Road. Due to their coverage of the Dexter tornado, reporters Chuck Gaidica and Paul Gross received Emmys in the weather sector for their efforts. According to a public poll, the Dexter tornado was deemed the eighth-worst disaster of the 2010s decade in Michigan.

== Non-tornadic effects and other tornadoes ==
The severe weather pattern that produced the Dexter tornado also brought reports of severe hail and flooding to Southeast Michigan and The Thumb, with damaging hail being the predominant severe weather event observed on March 15. After the dissipation of the Dexter tornado, the cell associated with the tornado continued slowly southeast towards Ann Arbor. The system brought an estimated 1.8 in (4.6 cm) of precipitation to Ann Arbor's west side, with some areas experiencing floodwaters up to 3–4 ft (0.91–1.22 m) deep. Two areas that sustained significant flooding were the Park Place and Manchester Flats Apartments, which are both located along Pauline Boulevard in Ann Arbor. At Park Place, seven apartment units sustained varying degrees of flooding, with some units having 3–4 ft (0.91–1.22 m) of water inside. One dog was killed in these apartments as a result of the flooding, and 10 cars in the Park Place parking lots were damaged by the waters. The Manchester Flats Apartments experienced floodwaters several inches deep.

The ruination of these apartments caused many tenants to be displaced, some of which were without insurance and had no place to go or live. The Washtenaw County coordinator for the Salvation Army, Major John Williams, offered shelter for these displaced tenants.

=== Other tornadoes ===
In addition to the Dexter tornado, two other tornadoes touched down in Michigan on March 15, 2012: an EF0 near the unincorporated community of Ida in central Monroe County, and an EF2 south of Columbiaville in Lapeer County. The respective statistics of these tornadoes, as well as their damage, are documented below.

EF#	Location	County / Parish	Time (UTC)	Path length	Maximum width
EF2	S of Columbiaville	Lapeer	22:49–23:04	4.59 mi (7.39 km)	400 yd (370 m)
EF2	Much of the damage from this tornado consisted of "uprooted trees and minor structural damage"; however, a house was shifted from its foundation and an attached garage was destroyed, justifying an EF2 rating with estimated winds of 125 mph (201 km/h).				
EF0	Ida	Monroe	22:50–22:52	0.56 mi (0.90 km)	50 yd (46 m)
EF0	Siding and shingles were removed from a house, a car was tipped over, a shed was completely destroyed, and several trees were blown down.				

== See also ==
- 2022 Gaylord tornado — A similarly devastating EF3 tornado in Michigan, which was the most recent EF3 tornado to occur in the state following the Dexter tornado
- 1956 Saugatuck–Holland tornado — A slow-moving, thin, and destructive tornado in West Michigan, which took place during a widespread tornado outbreak sequence
- 1990 Plainfield tornado — Another tornado with an unusual southeastern movement; it caused F5-level damage in the Chicago metropolitan area
- List of Michigan tornadoes
