= List of Michigan tornadoes =

List of tornadoes in the U.S. state of Michigan

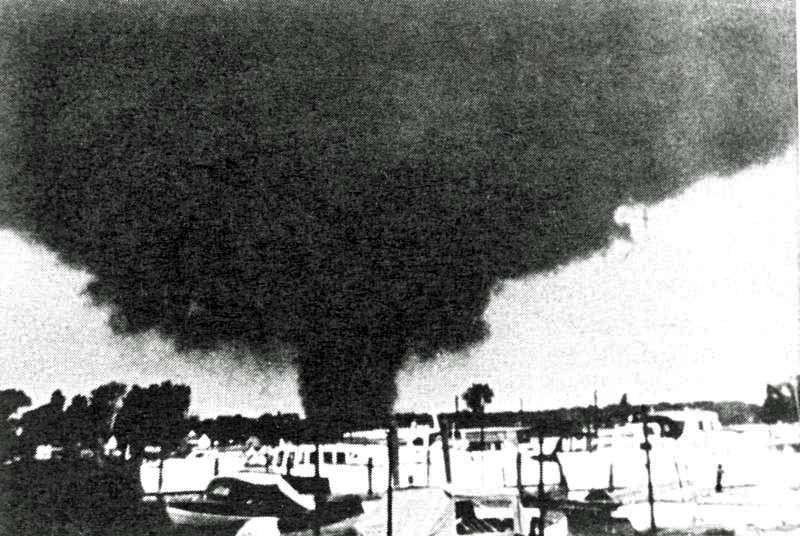
An F4 tornado in Erie on June 8, 1953

Tornadoes in the U.S. state of Michigan are not uncommon, with an estimated 17 tornadoes touching down every year since 1880. Although Michigan is not in the traditional tornado alley, it has had several destructive tornadoes since records began.

== Climatology ==
The state averages 17 tornadoes per year, which are more common in the state's extreme southern section. Portions of the southern border have been almost as vulnerable historically as states further west and in Tornado Alley. For this reason, many communities in the southernmost portions of the state have tornado sirens to warn residents of approaching tornadoes. Farther north, in Central Michigan, Northern Michigan, and the Upper Peninsula, tornadoes are less common.

== Events ==
FU	F0	F1	F2	F3	F4	F5
2+	1+	2+	3	2	0	1

=== Pre-1950 ===
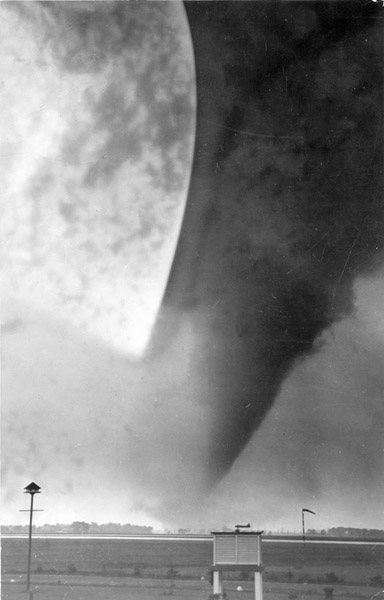
An F4 tornado that struck the Detroit River on June 17, 1946

- April 18, 1880 – A strong F2 tornado hit areas near Chester, downing large amounts of trees and destroying several barns.
- September 17, 1895 – A strong tornado touched down near Kinde, killing at least 2.
- May 25, 1896 – A long-tracked F2 tornado moved through Genesee and Lapeer counties, destroying multiple poorly built structures and injuring 4 people. A strong F3 tornado moved through Bay and Tuscola counties, destroying an estimated 7 homes and a school. One observer was killed when debris went through their window. A long-tracked and deadly F3 tornado moved through Macomb and St. Clair counties at high speeds, destroying 30 homes. The tornado moved into Ontario briefly before lifting, causing 2 deaths and $60,000 (1896 USD) in damages. An extremely violent F5 tornado touched down near Holly, destroying hundreds of homes and killing 47 people. It is the second-deadliest tornado in Michigan history. A brief F2 tornado hit Amadore, destroying the entire village and injuring 3 people.
- November 11, 1911 – A rare cold snap spawned 2 F2 tornadoes in Michigan. The first tracked through Shiawassee County, damaging multiple structures, uprooting trees, and killing 2 people. The second was a brief tornado that touched down near Battle Creek, damaging several homes and destroying 5 barns.
- March 28, 1920 – A weak F2 tornado tracked through Berrien County, damaging barns and destroying a small home. Another F2 tornado that began as a waterspout in Oceana County moved onshore, killing one person and destroying a home. A strong tornado tracked through Elkhart County in Indiana, before crossing the Indiana-Michigan state line into Cass County, destroying four farm buildings at F3 intensity and injuring 8 people. 2 F2 tornadoes touched down near Kalamazoo, briefly causing damage to homes and other small structures. A violent F4 tornado initially touched down in Steuben County in Indiana before crossing into Branch County. 2 people were killed, and 5 others were injured. A deadly F3 tornado caused extensive damage in Eaton, Clinton, Gratiot and Saginaw counties, damaging hundreds of structures and killing 1 person. 1 other was injured, and the tornado caused an estimated $250,000 (1920 USD) in damages. A violent F4 tornado hit Barry and Eaton counties, killing 4 people in Maple Grove and injuring 25 others. An intense F3 tornado touched down near Orangeville, causing extensive damage to homes and killing 1 person. An F4 tornado tracked through areas around Fenton, causing damage to homes and trees, and killing 4 people. A brief F2 tornado hit Shiawassee County, destroying multiple barns and killing livestock. Another brief and weak F2 tornado touched down directly west of Saginaw, damaging 4 barns and damaging farmsteads. A weak F2 tornado touched down on the outskirts of Lansing, destroying a home and injuring one person. An F2 tornado briefly damaged a barn and home in Free Soil, before lifting.
- May 9, 1927 – A brief F2 tornado touched down near Walker, destroying various barns. Another F2 tornado tracked through Isabella, Clare and Gladwin counties, destroying multiple homes but causing no injuries.
- June 17, 1946 – A violent and extremely powerful F4 tornado hit River Rouge and the Detroit River before crossing into Windsor, Ontario. 17 were killed, and the tornado caused an estimated $9.663 million (1946 USD) in damages.

FU	F0	F1	F2	F3	F4	F5
4	6+	1	4	3	4	2

=== 1950–1959 ===
- June 26, 1951 – A brief F1 tornado touched down near Midland, damaging multiple structures and snapping trees.
- September 26, 1951 – A brief but deadly F2 tornado hit Lilley, destroying multiple industrial structures and killing one person.
- May 21, 1953 – A violent F4 tornado tracked through Port Huron, causing extensive damage and killing 7 people before crossing into Sarnia, Ontario. The tornado injured an estimated 117 people and inflicted $17.6 million (1953 USD) on both of the towns.
- June 8, 1953 – A violent F4 tornado hit Temperance, killing 4 people and destroying 14 houses. The tornado caused an estimated $250,000 (1953 USD) in damages, and was one of multiple deadly tornadoes in Michigan on June 8. A strong F3 tornado touched down near Manchester, before tracking through Washtenaw County, causing extensive damage to structures and killing one person. Another intense F3 tornado moved through Livingston and Oakland counties, injuring 11 people and damaging multiple structures, including a post office. A strong F2 tornado tracked through Iosco County, damaging multiple houses and killing 4 people. A brief but strong F3 tornado hit Spruce, destroying multiple large barns and damaging crops. An extremely powerful and violent multi-vortex F5 tornado hit Beecher and Flint, killing 116 people and injuring another 844. A brief F0 tornado caused minor damage in Caseville before lifting.
- April 3, 1956 – A violent F4 tornado hit Allegan County, causing extensive damage and injuring 7 people. A deadly and extremely powerful F5 tornado tracked through Ottawa, Kent and Montcalm counties, killing 18 people and causing extreme damage in Standale. An extremely strong and violent F4 tornado hit Portage Point, killing 1 person and destroying up to 50 houses. A relatively strong and long-tracked F3 tornado moved through Van Buren, Allegan, Barry and Kent, destroying several structures in its path and injuring 23 people.
- June 22, 1957 – A brief but strong F2 tornado hit Hudsonville, causing extensive damage to the downtown area. A relatively long-tracked F1 tornado tracked through Ottawa and Cass counties, causing minor damage to trees and other structures. A weak F0 tornado briefly touched down in Allegan County, causing no damage. A strong F2 tornado caused extensive damage to the southern portions of Bay City, it was estimated to have caused $25,000 (1957 USD) in damages.
  FU	F0	F1	F2	F3	F4	F5
  1+	3+	7+	2	3	1+	0

=== 1960–1969 ===
- September 13, 1961 – A strong F2 tornado tracked through Grand Traverse and Kalkaska counties, causing damage to trees and destroying multiple structures.

FU	F0	F1	F2	F3	F4	F5
0	7	2	4	3	1	0

=== 1970–1979 ===
- April 1, 1974 – A strong F1 tornado moved through Branch County, causing extensive damage to multiple structures in its path.
- April 3, 1974 – A brief F2 tornado tracked through areas south of Rockwood, causing minor damage to trees. A deadly F2 tornado moved through Hillsdale and Jackson counties, killing 2 people and destroying over 160 structures. A strong F3 tornado moved through Wayne County, causing minor damage before rapidly strengthening and crossing into Essex County in Ontario. 9 people were killed, and all 9 deaths occurred on the Canadian side, where mainly F3 damage was inflicted. 2 brief twin F2 tornadoes moved through Hillsdale and Lenawee counties, causing minor damage to trees and small structures. 3 people were injured, but no fatalities occurred. A weak F3 tornado touched down near Temperance, heavily damaging a well-built home.
- March 20, 1976 – An extremely violent F4 tornado hit West Bloomfield and Farmington Hills, destroying hundreds of structures and killing 1 person. 55 were injured, and the tornado caused an estimated $50 million (1976 USD) in damages.

FU	F0	F1	F2	F3	F4	F5
0+	0+	4+	0+	0+	0+	0+

=== 1980–1989 ===
- May 13, 1980 – An F3 tornado touched down in downtown Kalamazoo, MI and caused $50 million in damages. 5 were killed and 79 injuries reported. Prior to the Kalamazoo tornado, an F3 tornado tracked through Van Buren county, spawned by the same supercell.

=== 1990–1999 ===
- June 13, 1994 – A F2 tornado ripped through Jackson County, leaving behind a 16-mile damage path.
- July 2, 1997 – 4 F1 tornadoes tracked through Saginaw County, damaging trees and homes.

=== 2000–2009 ===
- September 23, 2006 – A brief but relatively strong F0 tornado touched down in Kent County, inflicting minor damage to buildings and shifting mobile homes. A weak F0 tornado touched down in Ionia County, causing minor damage to trees.

EFU	EF0	EF1	EF2	EF3	EF4	EF5
0	0	2	1	1	0	0

=== 2010–2019 ===
- June 5, 2010 – 2 EF1 and EF2 tornadoes touched down in Berrien County, damaging trees and other structures.
- June 6, 2010 – An EF2 tornado touched down in Dundee, causing significant damage to local buildings and property.
- March 15, 2012 — An EF3 tornado touched down in the town of Dexter. This tornado tracked for almost eight miles causing snapped trees and significant structural damage. The tornado produced EF3 damage in the Horseshoe Bend Subdivision and in the Huron Farms Subdivision. The tornado sat nearly stationary before exiting the city. The tornado weakened and then lifted on the intersection of Zeeb Road and Ann Arbor-Dexter Road. Peak winds were estimated at 135-140 mph. No deaths or serious injuries were reported from this storm. Over $10 million dollars in damages were caused by this storm. A tornado of this magnitude would be seen for a decade with the 2022 Gaylord EF3.

EFU	EF0	EF1	EF2	EF3	EF4	EF5
1	5	10	5	2	0	0

=== 2020–present ===
- July 24, 2021 – Four tornadoes broke out in Michigan, including in Macomb County and the town of Armada. One person was injured when multiple trees fell on their home near White Lake Township.
- May 20, 2022 – An EF3 tornado tracked across Otsego County where it would hit the town of Gaylord. The heaviest damage would be west of Gaylord where it tore through a mobile home park and Gaylord's commercial district, before hitting a neighborhood north of downtown Gaylord where damage was less severe. Two were killed in the mobile home park and a further 44 were injured. The tornado caused an estimated $50 million in damage and was the most severe tornado to hit Michigan since the 1976 West Bloomfield Township tornado.
- April 1, 2023 – A weak EF0 tornado tracked through Monroe County, hitting the downtown area of Dundee and damaging several roofs.
- June 15, 2023 – An EF1 tornado tracked through Monroe County, damaging homes and vehicles.
- August 25, 2023 – An EF2 tornado tracked down I-96, destroying 11 semi trucks and hitting Webberville. Several hundred trees were uprooted by this tornado. 2 deaths are attributed to this tornado. An EF1 tornado also tracked through Kent County.
- February 28, 2024 - A nocturnal EF2 tornado touchdown down west of Grand Blanc. It carved a path of significant tree and structural damage through Grand Blanc and Atlas. A warehouse was completely destroyed and fallen trees were reported in the Indian Hill neighborhood. This was an extremely rare occurrence because of the intensity and for it happening in February.
- May 7, 2024 – An EF2 hit Portage, causing millions in damage. Two mobile home parks and numerous local businesses were damaged or destroyed, and hundreds of trees were uprooted.
- May 7, 2024 - A significant EF2 tornado touched down near Centreville. This tornado caused significant damage over a 19 mile path near the communities of Colon, Sherwood and Union City. A tornado emergency was issued for this tornado, the first time that had ever been issued in the state of Michigan. One injury was attributed to this tornado.
- June 5, 2024 – An EF1 tornado touched down on the western edge of Livonia, tracking northeast across I-96. It tracked through multiple neighborhoods before lifting east of Merriman Road, between Six Mile and Seven Mile.
- March 30, 2025 – An EF-1 tornado struck Cass County, uprooting and snapping trees along Dailey Road. The tornado was on the ground for 3 minutes and was 100 yards wide. Another tornado struck Kent County on March 30 as well, an EF-0 which caused damage to trees, property, and power infrastructure, resulting in at least 35,000 people losing power.
- May 16, 2025 – Near the overnight hours there were 11 tornadoes in Michigan including one that hit near Lansing. The town of Potterville experienced an EF1 tornado, causing extensive damage in the area.
- March 6, 2026 - Multiple significant tornadoes struck Southern Michigan including one that was rated EF3 did significant damage, leveling multiple homes and killing 3 and injuring 12 near Union City. Another significant tornado touched down in Three Rivers causing significant damage to multiple structures including a Menards. A weak but deadly tornado touched down near Edwardsburg causing damage to homes and killing 1.
- April 15, 2026 - At least seven tornadoes were confirmed across the state after severe storms moved through in the hours following midnight Wednesday, April 15th. Confirmed tornadoes were concentrated in Central and Southeast Michigan, with 3 confirmed EF0's affecting Bridgeport, Durand, and the state capital Lansing. Three EF1's were also confirmed; one in Albee, another in Ann Arbor, and a third EF1 in the Detroit suburb of Lincoln Park. Damages from the EF1's included downed trees, flipped cars, torn off roofs, and collapsed building walls. Another tornado of unknown strength was confirmed in St. Charles, bringing the total to 7.
- September 2-3, 2026 - An outbreak of three tornadoes touched down across Southeast Michigan. On the night of September 2, an EF0 tornado struck Marysville. Then on September 3, after an EF0 tornado hit Lincoln Park, an EF2 tornado hit Detroit. Over 260,000 customers lost power during the storms and tornadoes.

== Sources ==
- Grazulis, Thomas P. (November 1990). Significant Tornadoes 1880–1989. Vol. 2. St. Johnsbury, Vermont: The Tornado Project of Environmental Films. ISBN 1-879362-02-3.
- Grazulis, Thomas P. (July 1993). Significant Tornadoes 1680–1991: A Chronology and Analysis of Events. St. Johnsbury, Vermont: The Tornado Project of Environmental Films. ISBN 1-879362-03-1.
- Storm Data Publication (Report). National Centers for Environmental Information, National Weather Service. April 1956 – via Storm Events Database.
