= Columbiaville station =

Former train station in Michigan, US

Columbiaville
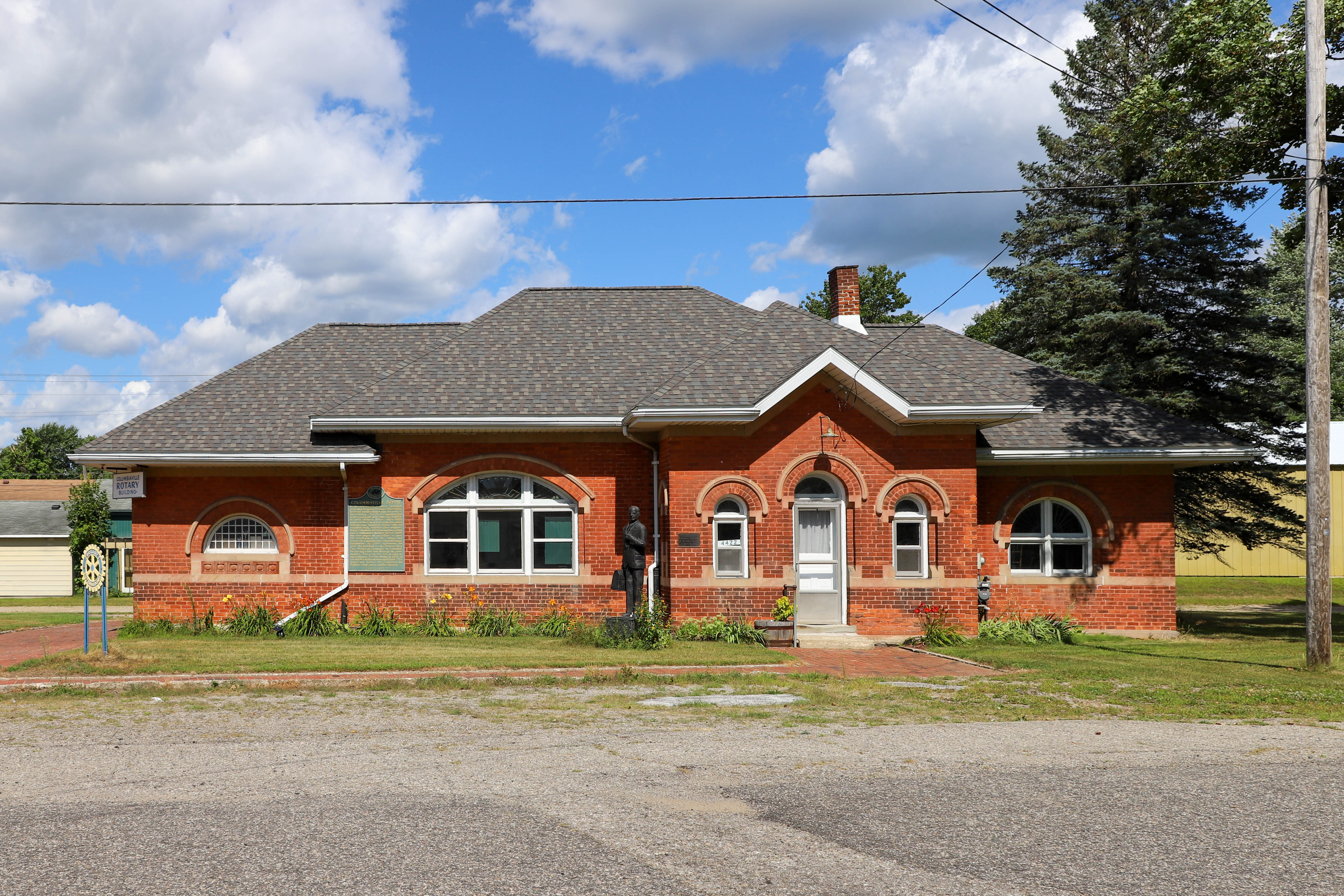

General information
- Location: 4643 First Street, Columbiaville, Lapeer County, Michigan 48421

Former services
Preceding station	New York Central Railroad	Following station
Otter Lake toward Mackinaw City	Mackinaw City – Detroit	Lapeer toward Detroit
- Detroit–Bay City Railroad Company Columbiaville Depot
- U.S. National Register of Historic Places
- Michigan State Historic Site
- Location within Michigan Location within the United States
- Location: 4643 First Street; Columbiaville, Michigan
- Coordinates: 43°09′22″N 83°24′32″W
- Built: 1893
- Architect: William Peter (1824–1899)
- Architectural style: Late Victorian, Queen Anne, Richardsonian Romanesque
- NRHP reference No.: 84001785

Significant dates
- Added to NRHP: April 5, 1984
- Designated MSHS: October 23, 1979
Location

Columbiaville Station, currently known as the Columbiaville Rotary Club and Public Library, is a former train station located at 4643 First Street in the village of Columbiaville in Marathon Township in northwestern Lapeer County, Michigan. It was designated as a Michigan State Historic Site on October 23, 1979, and later listed on the National Register of Historic Places on April 5, 1984, as the Detroit–Bay City Railroad Company Columbiaville Depot.

Built in 1893, the structure is a mix of Late Victorian, Queen Anne, and Richardsonian Romanesque style architecture. It is a small, one-story brick building with walls measuring 18 inches (46 cm) thick, and it maintains its original paneling, floors, ceiling, and painted brick walls since its construction. The structure was built on the site of an earlier train station that was built in 1872. The site served as a train station from 1872 to 1964 and was a prominent stopover for passenger and freight trains traveling to and from Detroit and Bay City, and the Columbiaville Depot aided in the growth of the area. The station is associated with lumber entrepreneur William Peter (1824–1899), who moved to the area in 1847 and platted the village of Columbiaville in 1871. To spur his business, Peter built the first station with an agreement with the Detroit–Bay City Railroad Company to establish a depot in Columbiaville, and the current structure was completed in 1893 to further increase transportation along the railway. The depot was decommissioned in 1964, and the railway itself ceased operation in 1977. The structure today houses the Columbiaville Rotary Club and a public library.

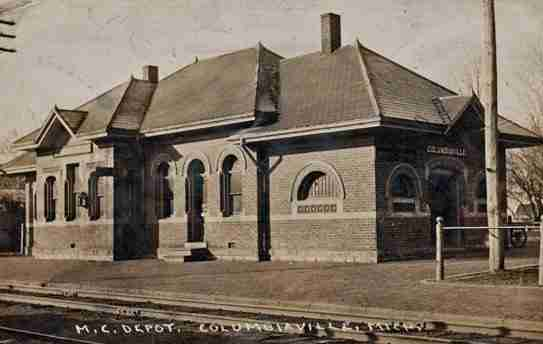
Columbiaville Station, ca. 1910.
