= Otter Lake, Michigan =

- Village
- Village of Otter Lake
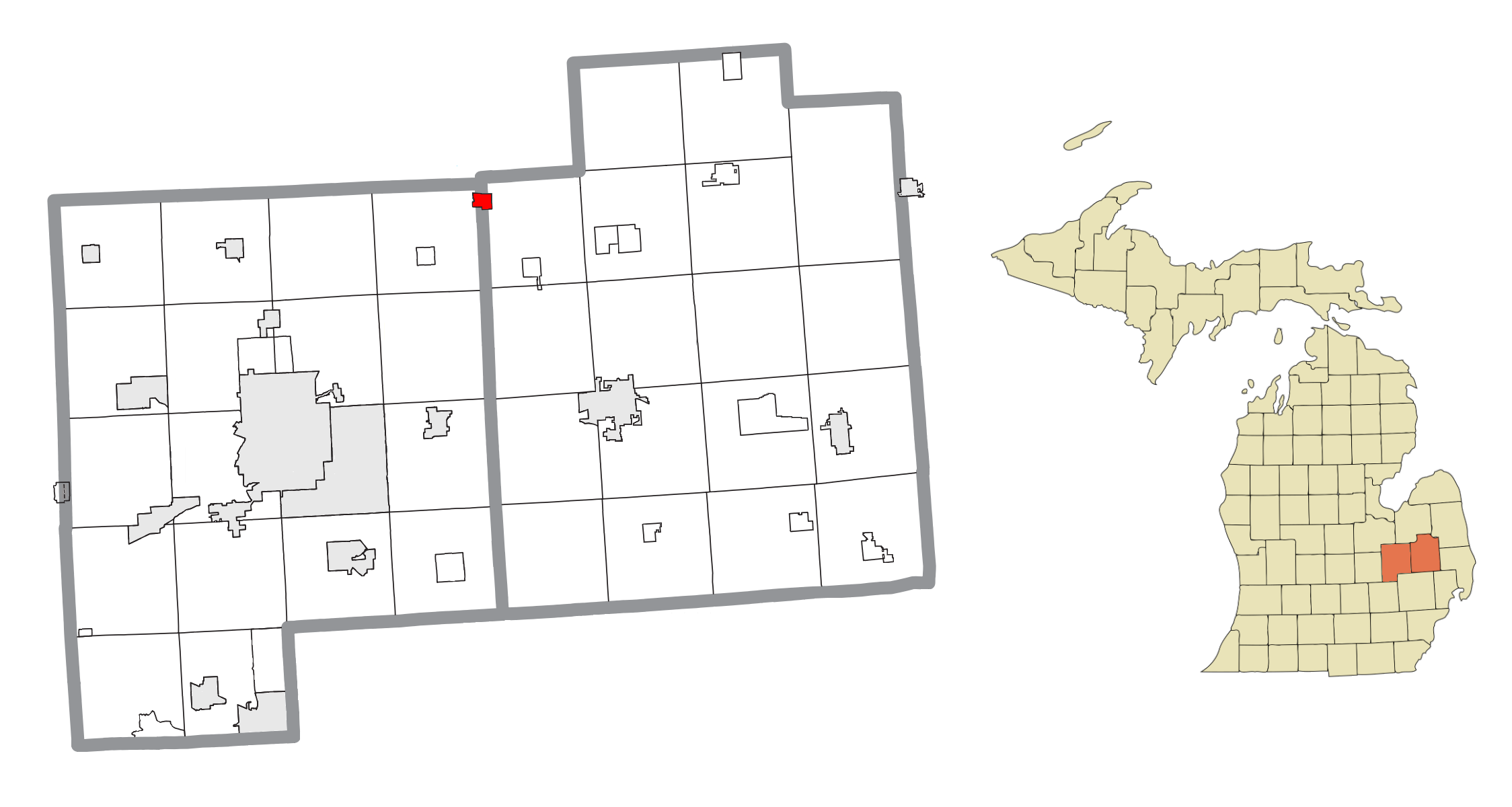
- Location within Genesee County (left) and Lapeer County (right)

- Location within the state of Michigan Location within the United States
- Coordinates: 43°12′48″N 83°27′29″W
- Country: United States
- State: Michigan
- Counties: Genesee and Lapeer
- Townships: Forest and Marathon
- Settled: 1838
- Platted: 1874
- Incorporated: 1883

Government
  - Type: Village council
  - President: David Dorr
  - Clerk: Terry Gill
  - Treasurer: Ray Benson

Area
  - Total: 0.83 sq mi (2.15 km^{2})
  - Land: 0.76 sq mi (1.97 km^{2})
  - Water: 0.081 sq mi (0.21 km^{2})
- Elevation: 873 ft (266 m)

Population (2020)
  - Total: 426
  - Density: 513.25/sq mi (198.17/km^{2})
- Time zone: UTC-5 (EST)
  - Summer (DST): UTC-4 (EDT)
- ZIP code(s): 48464
- Area code: 810
- FIPS code: 26-61760
- GNIS feature ID: 0634196
- Website: Official website

Otter Lake is a village in the U.S. state of Michigan. The village is split between Marathon Township in Lapeer County to the east and Forest Township in Genesee County to the west. The population was 426 at the 2020 census.

== History ==
Otter Lake was first settled in 1838 by Andrew McArthur. The Otter Lake post office opened on February 12, 1873, with postmaster John M. McDonald. In 1874, Page & Benson pine lumber company platted the community. That same year, the Pere Marquette Railroad came through. The village was named after the nearby body of water which had numerous otters. The Village of Otter Lake was incorporated in 1883.

== Geography ==
According to the U.S. Census Bureau, the village has a total area of 0.83 square miles (2.15 km^{2}), of which 0.76 square miles (1.97 km^{2}) is land and 0.08 square miles (0.21 km^{2}) (9.64%) is water.

== Demographics ==
Historical population
| Census | Pop. | Note | %± |
|---|---|---|---|
| 1890 | 243 | | — |
| 1900 | 212 | | −12.8% |
| 1910 | 273 | | 28.8% |
| 1920 | 325 | | 19.0% |
| 1930 | 336 | | 3.4% |
| 1940 | 515 | | 53.3% |
| 1950 | 523 | | 1.6% |
| 1960 | 562 | | 7.5% |
| 1970 | 551 | | −2.0% |
| 1980 | 456 | | −17.2% |
| 1990 | 474 | | 3.9% |
| 2000 | 437 | | −7.8% |
| 2010 | 389 | | −11.0% |
| 2020 | 426 | | 9.5% |
U.S. Decennial Census

=== 2010 census ===
As of the census of 2010, there were 389 people, 144 households, and 99 families living in the village. The population density was 511.8 inhabitants per square mile (197.6/km^{2}). There were 177 housing units at an average density of 232.9 per square mile (89.9/km^{2}). The racial makeup of the village was 94.3% White, 0.3% African American, 1.3% Native American, 0.3% Asian, 0.3% Pacific Islander, 0.3% from other races, and 3.3% from two or more races. Hispanic or Latino of any race were 1.8% of the population.

There were 144 households, of which 31.3% had children under the age of 18 living with them, 47.9% were married couples living together, 13.2% had a female householder with no husband present, 7.6% had a male householder with no wife present, and 31.3% were non-families. 25.0% of all households were made up of individuals, and 7.7% had someone living alone who was 65 years of age or older. The average household size was 2.70 and the average family size was 3.21.

The median age in the village was 38.4 years. 25.7% of residents were under the age of 18; 8.7% were between the ages of 18 and 24; 24.4% were from 25 to 44; 29.6% were from 45 to 64; and 11.6% were 65 years of age or older. The gender makeup of the village was 54.8% male and 45.2% female.

=== 2000 census ===
As of the census of 2000, there were 437 people, 154 households, and 117 families living in the village. The population density was 643.3 inhabitants per square mile (248.4/km^{2}). There were 174 housing units at an average density of 256.2 per square mile (98.9/km^{2}). The racial makeup of the village was 97.25% White, 1.14% Native American, and 1.60% from two or more races. Hispanic or Latino of any race were 2.75% of the population.

There were 154 households, out of which 33.1% had children under the age of 18 living with them, 56.5% were married couples living together, 13.6% had a female householder with no husband present, and 24.0% were non-families. 17.5% of all households were made up of individuals, and 5.2% had someone living alone who was 65 years of age or older. The average household size was 2.84 and the average family size was 3.18.

In the village, the population was spread out, with 29.7% under the age of 18, 8.0% from 18 to 24, 30.7% from 25 to 44, 19.7% from 45 to 64, and 11.9% who were 65 years of age or older. The median age was 32 years. For every 100 females, there were 100.5 males. For every 100 females age 18 and over, there were 100.7 males.

The median income for a household in the village was $49,000, and the median income for a family was $49,167. Males had a median income of $32,024 versus $30,833 for females. The per capita income for the village was $17,927. About 6.7% of families and 7.8% of the population were below the poverty line, including 8.9% of those under age 18 and none of those age 65 or over.
