= 2026 Union City tornado =

EF3 tornado in Michigan, U.S. in 2026

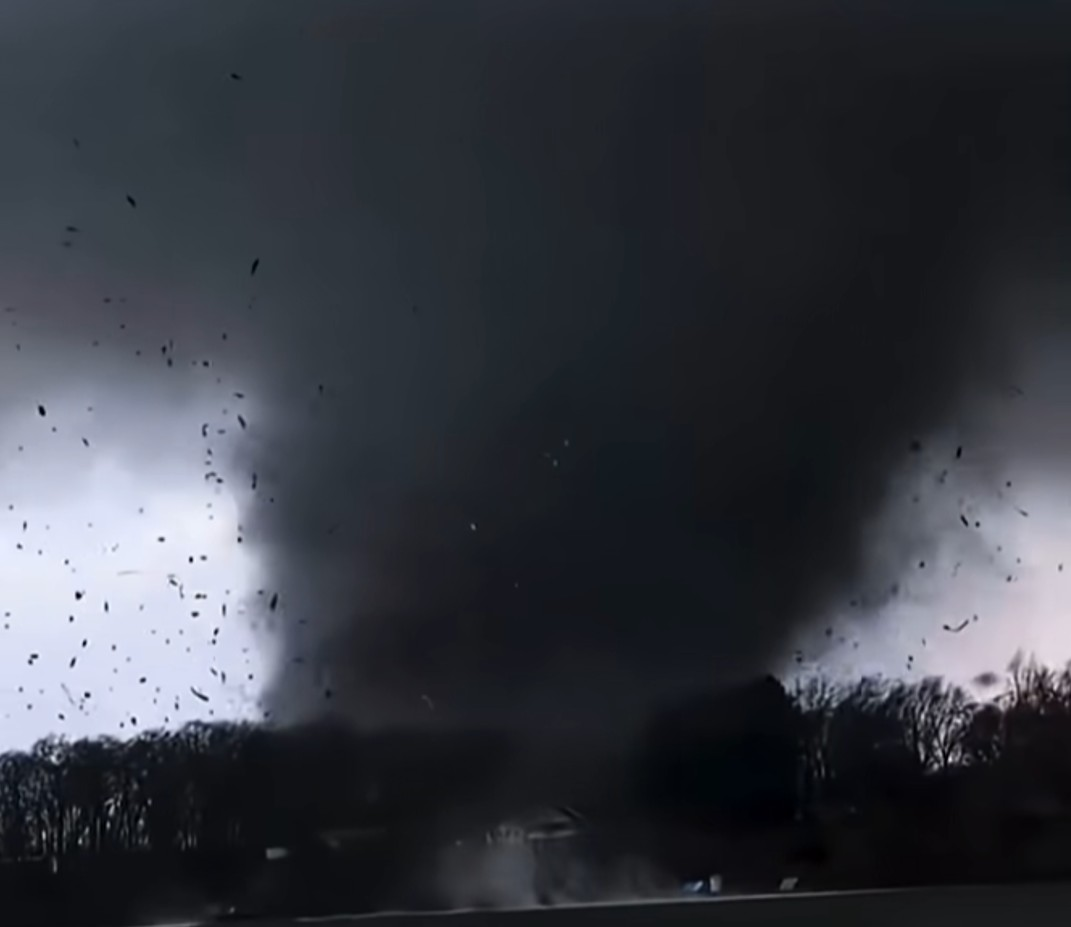
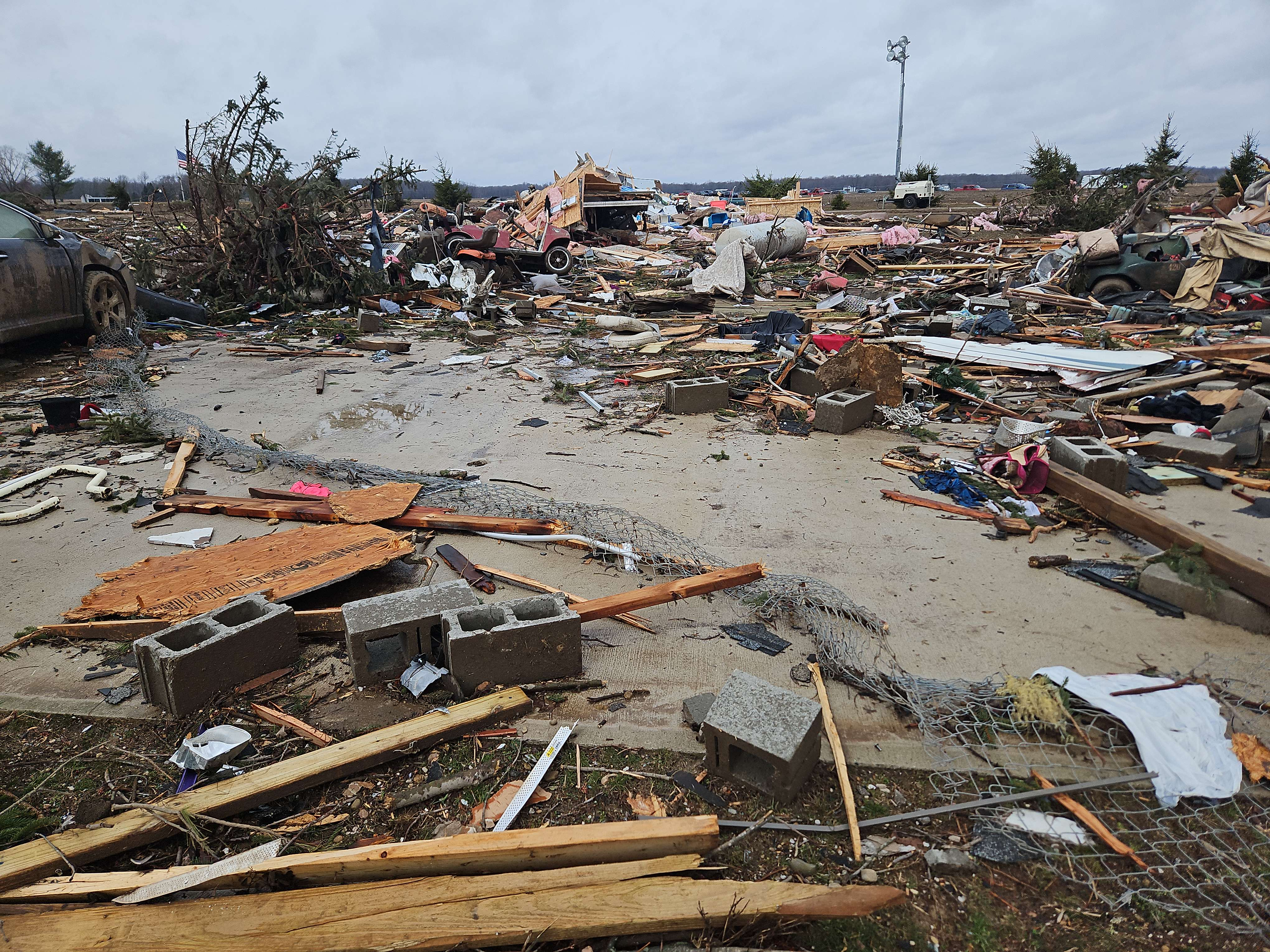
- Clockwise from Top; A video still of the tornado at peak intensity along Union Lake; NEXRAD scan of the tornado at 4:36 pm EST as it approached Union City; A graphic map of the tornado's track Mid-range EF3 damage to a property along the shore of Union Lake.

Meteorological history
- Formed: March 6, 2026, 4:33 p.m. EST (UTC−05:00)
- Dissipated: March 6, 2026, 4:42 p.m. EST (UTC−05:00)
- Duration: 9 minutes

EF3 tornado
- on the Enhanced Fujita scale
- Max width: 500 yards (0.28 mi; 0.46 km)
- Path length: 4.46 miles (7.18 km)
- Highest winds: 160 mph (260 km/h)

Overall effects
- Fatalities: 3
- Injuries: 12
- Damage: Unknown
- Areas affected: Branch County, Michigan, particularly near Union City
- Part of the Tornado outbreak of March 5–7, 2026 and Tornadoes of 2026

During the afternoon hours of March 6, 2026, a short-lived yet deadly and destructive tornado tracked through Union City, Michigan. Part of a deadly tornado outbreak, this tornado was the third and most intense tornado spawned by a cyclic supercell in southwest Michigan.

The tornado tracked 4.46 miles (7.18 km) through Branch County, destroying multiple homes along Union Lake, claiming the lives of 3, and injuring 12 more. This tornado was the strongest tornado to occur in Michigan in nearly 50 years, as well as the deadliest in the state since the 1980 Kalamazoo tornado.

== Meteorological synopsis ==
=== Storm Prediction Center outlook ===
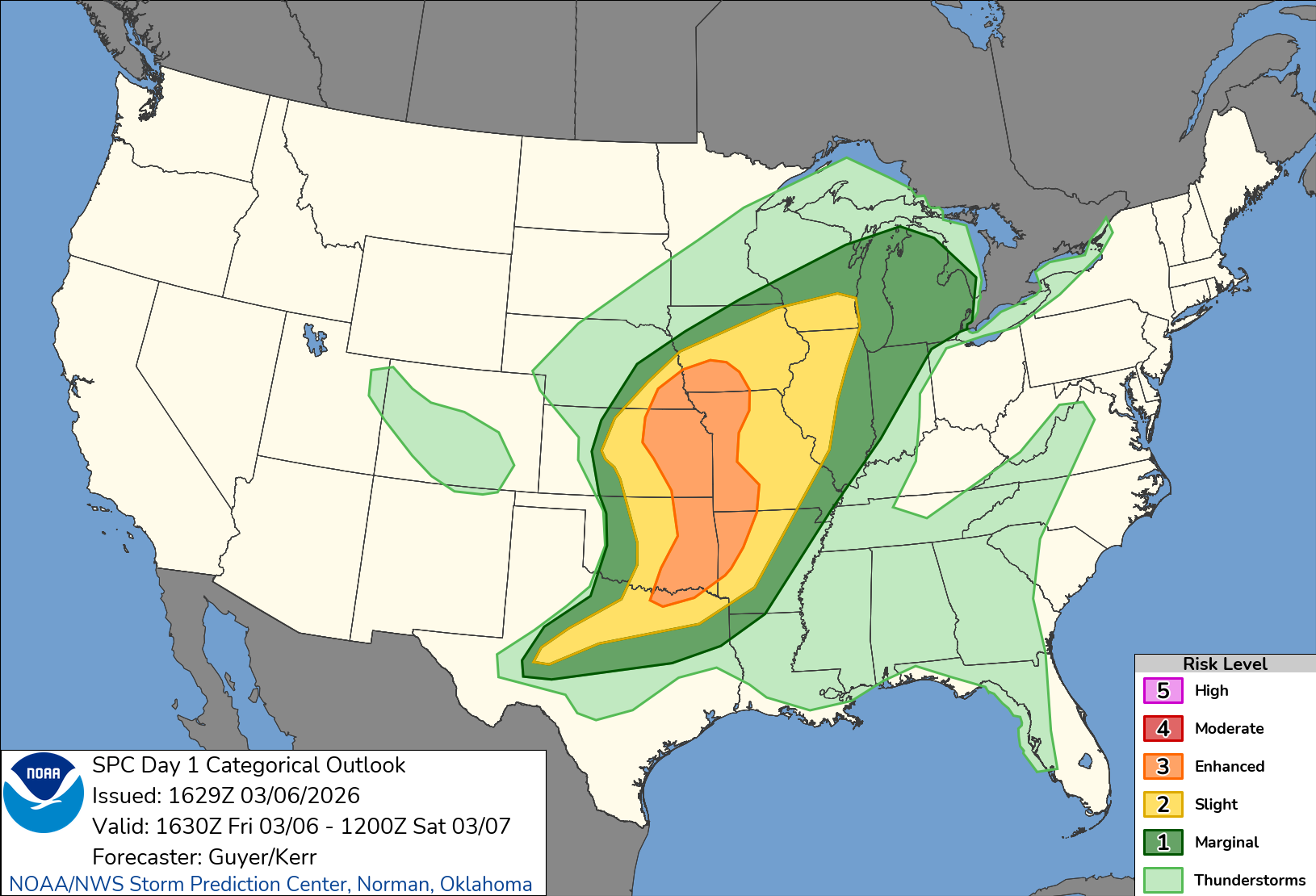
The Storm Prediction Center's 1630 UTC Day 1 Convective Outlook for March 6, 2026.

On March 6, the Storm Prediction Center outlined an Enhanced Risk for severe weather for the Great Plains and the Ozarks. The primary hazard was expected to be large hail. A 10% tornado risk with a CIG1 hatched area was outlined from north-eastern Texas into south-west Missouri, including eastern Oklahoma and western Arkansas, with the primary tornado threat expected to happen in Nebraska, Kansas, and Oklahoma, extending into western Arkansas, Missouri, and southern Iowa.

A marginal risk was outlined for Michigan, including Union City, along with a 2% tornado probability. However, it was noted through the CIG1 hatched probability that a conditional strong tornado risk did exist for the region. The primary severe threat expected for Michigan was isolated damaging winds through the late night into early morning; probabilities were low due to the forecasted lack of instability.

=== Regional atmospheric conditions ===
On the night of March 5, 2026, a warm front stalled over northern Indiana and slowly moved northward throughout the afternoon hours of March 6th, with said crossing the Indiana-Michigan state line by 3 pm EST. Southerly winds boosted temperatures into the low to mid 70s across southern Michigan, in conjunction with ample low level moisture being transported northward. Wind shear values built up to 40-50 knots along with surface based CAPE values of 500-2000 J/kg. Storm-relative helicity (SRH) levels reached 200-250 m²/s² within the vicinity of Branch County as well, which is favorable for the formation of supercellular tornadoes.

=== Supercell formation and initial tornadoes ===
Just after 4 pm EST, a supercell developed in northern Indiana and rode the frontal boundary up into southern Michigan. The supercell initially produced a weak but deadly tornado near Edwardsburg, Michigan, then later produced a strong tornado that impacted the city of Three Rivers, Michigan, where 10 people were injured and multiple businesses sustained damage. Hailstones ranging from quarter to golf ball size fell along the supercells path, with the largest hailstones being 1.75 inches. The National Weather Service issued a tornado warning including Union City at 4:26 pm EST.

NOAA Weather Radio audio of the tornado warning that was issued for Union City.

== Tornado summary ==
=== Formation and peak intensity along Union Lake ===
- Damage survey track of the tornado Key EF0 65–85 mph (105–137 km/h); EF1 86–110 mph (138–177 km/h); EF2 111–135 mph (179–217 km/h); EF3 136–165 mph (219–266 km/h)

At 4:33 p.m. EST, the tornado touched down in northwest Branch County, Michigan near Union Lake between Blossom Rd and Mendon Rd, tracking east northeastward towards homes along the shore of Union Lake. Moving along the north side of Union Lake, the tornado inflicted EF1 to EF2 damage to a pole barn and 2 houses. The tornado then crossed Tuttle Park Drive before destroying a large outbuilding and throwing a 500 U.S. gal (1,900 L) propane tank into a nearby field.

Ground scouring was noted as the tornado rapidly intensified to EF3 strength along Prairie Rose Lane, becoming a fully condensed multiple vortex tornado. The neighborhood along Prairie Rose Lane was devastated, with nine homes being severely damaged at EF3 intensity, some being completely swept off of their foundations. All fatalities occurred in mobile homes that were completely destroyed. Several vehicles were thrown in the area and ice was seen being lofted into the tornado off of Union Lake.

High-end EF3 damage to a multi-story home on Prairie Rose Lane.

A large metal outbuilding that was anchored to the foundation took a direct hit, being completely destroyed at high-end EF2 strength. A home would have its slab nearly swept clean at mid-range EF3 strength. The home was poorly anchored as sill plates were held down by screws instead of anchor bolts. South of the home, A well-anchored mobile home was tossed around 100 yards (91 m), severely damaging the frame, where one fatality occurred. Subsequent homes would sustain major damage ranging from the removal of exterior walls to the collapse of all walls. An anchored home was completely swept clean, with only a subfloor and a fireplace where a man survived in remaining. The tornado reached a peak intensity of high-end EF3 as it completely demolished the last home along Prairie Rose Lane, a large two-story home anchored to a cinder block foundation, where winds of 160 mph (260 km/h) were estimated.

Past Prairie Rose Lane, multiple trees would have their trucks snapped. A home west of Tuttle Rd had its exterior walls collapse, and a barn along Tuttle Rd was completely destroyed at low-end EF2 intensity.

=== Union City and Dissipation ===
The tornado significantly weakened as it continued into Union City proper, where it inflicted EF0–EF1 damage. A store in downtown Union City had its front wall collapse, and a nearby church had its roof structure collapse. Soon after leaving Union City, the tornado continued to uproot more trees before dissipating at 4:42 EST local time near the Branch/Calhoun County line. The tornado tracked 4.46 miles (7.18 km) and reached a maximum width of 500 yards (460 m). After the Union City tornado dissipated, the parent supercell continued its track across southeastern Michigan. It went on to produce one final EF0 tornado in Calhoun County, shortly after which the supercell would dissipate.

== Aftermath ==
A home that had all of its walls collapse at mid-range EF3 intensity. One man would survive the tornado in the fireplace seen in the background.

Around 70 homes in the Union City area were damaged or destroyed by the tornado. Trees and powerlines were downed by the tornado, resulting in at least 2,000 customers losing power.

The tornado was the earliest intense-to-violent tornado to ever occur in the calendar year for the state of Michigan and was initially considered for an EF4 rating, however the tornado was rated an EF3 on the Enhanced Fujita scale with its final wind-speeds being 160 mph (260 km/h) due to homes being built with older building codes, and therefore having construction flaws.

=== Recovery efforts ===
Michigan governor Gretchen Whitmer issued a state of emergency in Branch, St. Joseph, and Cass counties to coordinate an all-hands-on-deck response to the severe weather. Volunteers spent the weekend collecting and distributing supplies like food and water. Operation BBQ, a volunteer group, soon arrived in Union City and began to give out free meals to residents affected by the tornado, as well as first responders. Union City High School offered shelter and resources to those affected, and began to accept monetary and material donations. One month after the tornado, Union City purchased a new tornado siren for the village as previous siren was not designed as a true tornado siren, and only provided limited coverage.

The state requested federal aid from FEMA for those affected in Branch, Cass and St. Joseph Counties following the tornado. FEMA denied aid and an appeal was requested in June, which FEMA also denied stating that tornadoes of March 6 in Michigan did not meet the severity and magnitude requirements for federal aid, as well as the impacts not exceeding the response capabilities of the Michigan state government, as well as local governments.

== See also ==
- Weather of 2026
- List of North American tornadoes and tornado outbreaks
- 1964 Chesterfield Township tornado – A similarly short-tracked but violent and deadly tornado that struck Michigan in 1964.
- 1980 Kalamazoo tornado – The previous deadliest tornado in the state of Michigan.
