= Marathon Township, Michigan =

- Civil township
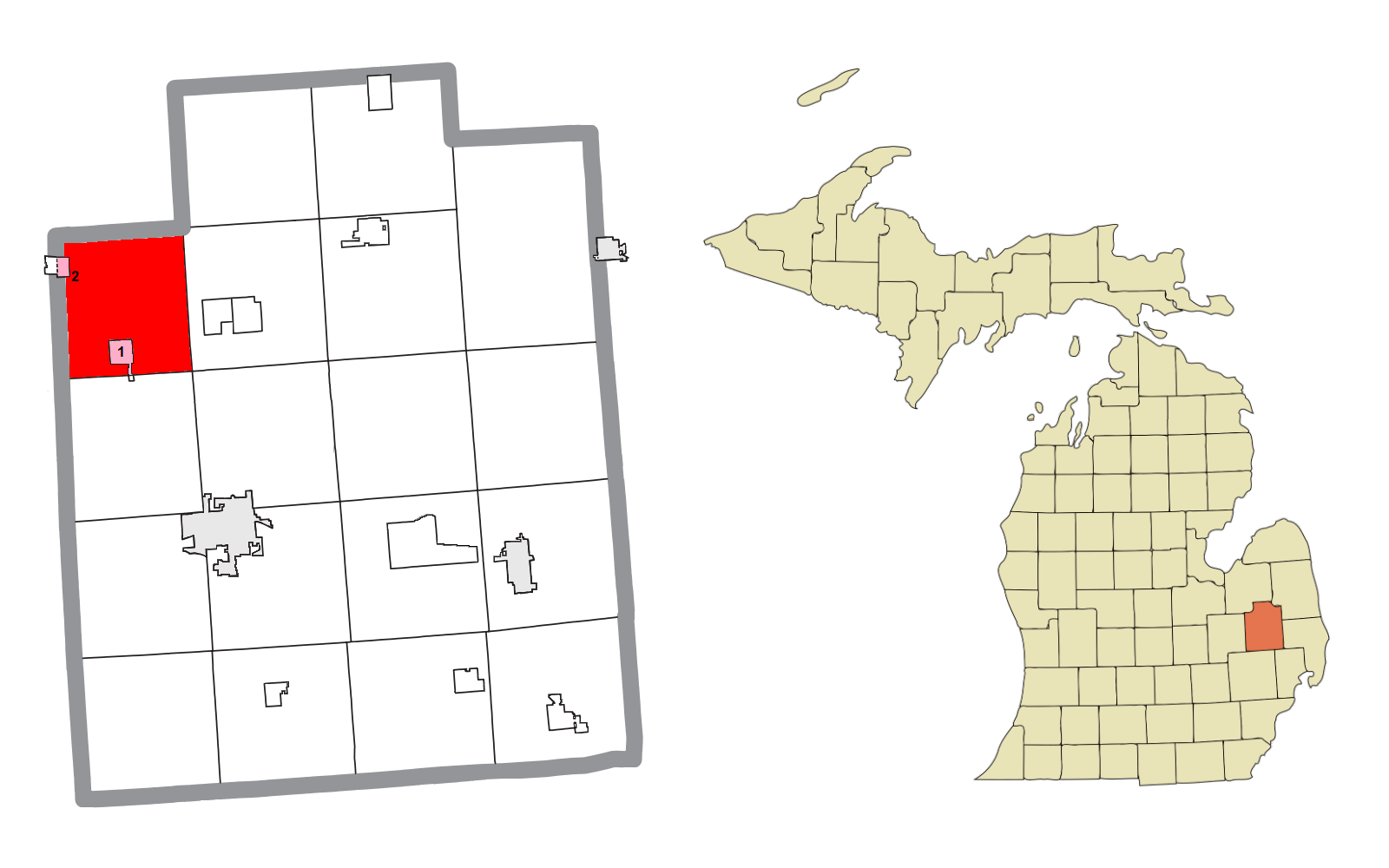
- Location within Lapeer County and administered portions of the villages of Columbiaville (1) and Otter Lake (2)

- Location within the state of Michigan Location within the United States
- Coordinates: 43°11′26″N 83°24′59″W
- Country: United States
- State: Michigan
- County: Lapeer

Area
  - Total: 34.4 sq mi (89.1 km^{2})
  - Land: 33.4 sq mi (86.6 km^{2})
  - Water: 0.97 sq mi (2.5 km^{2})
- Elevation: 791 ft (241 m)

Population (2020)
  - Total: 4,467
  - Density: 134/sq mi (51.6/km^{2})
- Time zone: UTC-5 (Eastern (EST))
  - Summer (DST): UTC-4 (EDT)
- FIPS code: 26-51420
- GNIS feature ID: 1626682
- Website: https://www.marathontownship.com/

Marathon Township is a civil township of Lapeer County in the U.S. state of Michigan. The population was 4,467 at the 2020 Census.

== History ==
The township was organized in 1839, named for the site of the Battle of Marathon in ancient Greece. The township initially included the adjacent townships of Oregon and Deerfield.

== Geography ==
According to the United States Census Bureau, the township has a total area of 34.4 square miles (89 km^{2}), of which 33.4 square miles (87 km^{2}) is land and 1.0 square mile (2.6 km^{2}) (2.79%) is water.

== Demographics ==
As of the census of 2000, there were 4,701 people, 1,617 households, and 1,301 families residing in the township. The population density was 140.6 inhabitants per square mile (54.3/km^{2}). There were 1,764 housing units at an average density of 52.8 per square mile (20.4/km^{2}). The racial makeup of the township was 96.68% White, 0.66% African American, 0.79% Native American, 0.26% Asian, 0.74% from other races, and 0.87% from two or more races. Hispanic or Latino of any race were 1.91% of the population.

There were 1,617 households, out of which 39.1% had children under the age of 18 living with them, 66.9% were married couples living together, 8.7% had a female householder with no husband present, and 19.5% were non-families. 15.7% of all households were made up of individuals, and 5.6% had someone living alone who was 65 years of age or older. The average household size was 2.88 and the average family size was 3.18.

In the township the population was spread out, with 28.1% under the age of 18, 7.7% from 18 to 24, 32.1% from 25 to 44, 22.7% from 45 to 64, and 9.4% who were 65 years of age or older. The median age was 36 years. For every 100 females, there were 102.5 males. For every 100 females age 18 and over, there were 100.3 males.

The median income for a household in the township was $49,255, and the median income for a family was $51,915. Males had a median income of $40,026 versus $25,536 for females. The per capita income for the township was $19,469. About 5.9% of families and 7.8% of the population were below the poverty line, including 10.0% of those under age 18 and 9.1% of those age 65 or over.
