= Oregon Township, Michigan =

- Civil township
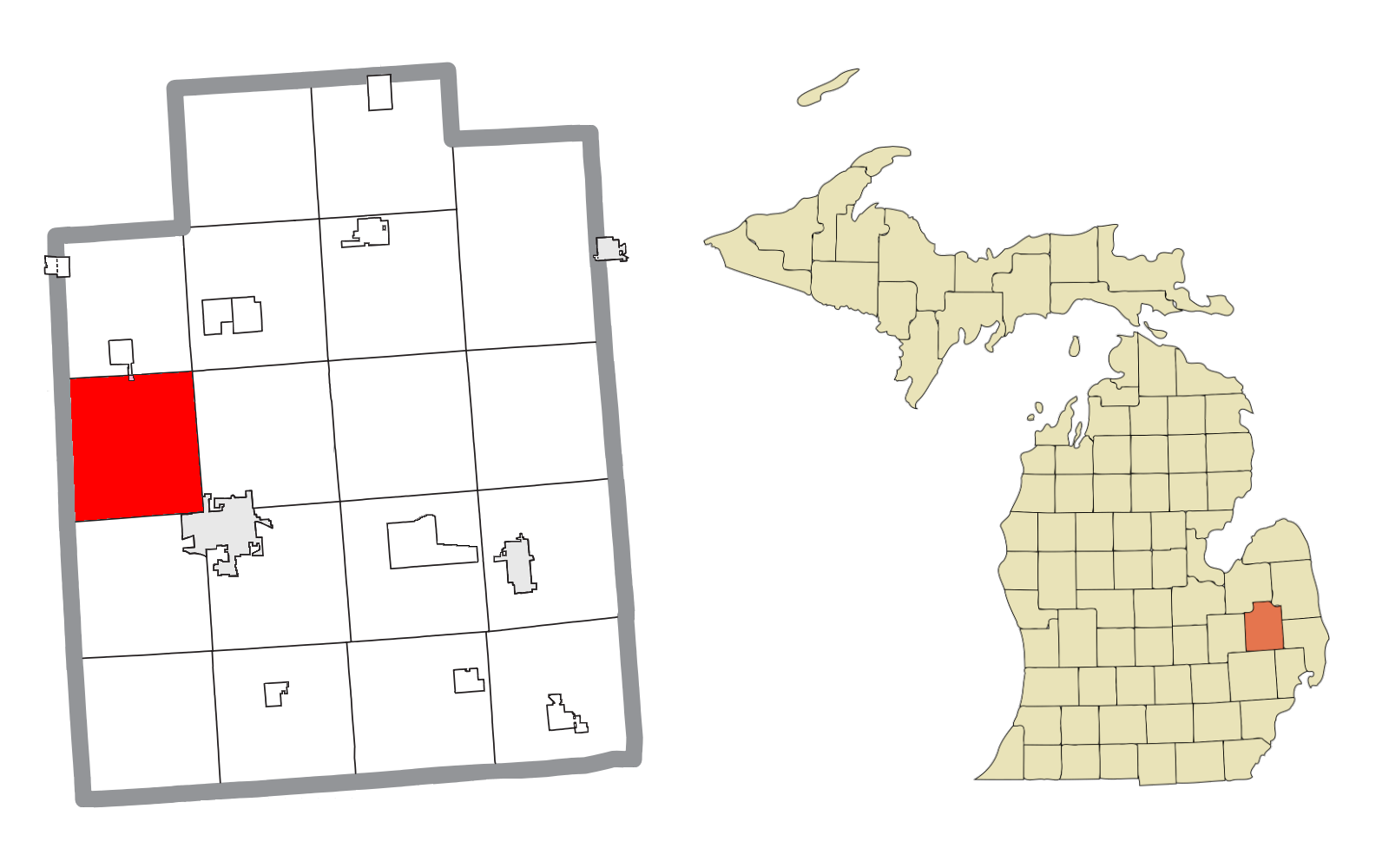
- Location within Lapeer County (red) and an administered portion of the village of Columbiaville (pink)

- Location within the state of Michigan Location within the United States
- Coordinates: 43°06′26″N 83°24′34″W
- Country: United States
- State: Michigan
- County: Lapeer

Area
  - Total: 35.3 sq mi (91.3 km^{2})
  - Land: 33.2 sq mi (85.9 km^{2})
  - Water: 2.1 sq mi (5.4 km^{2})
- Elevation: 804 ft (245 m)

Population (2020)
  - Total: 5,712
  - Density: 172/sq mi (66.5/km^{2})
- Time zone: UTC-5 (Eastern (EST))
  - Summer (DST): UTC-4 (EDT)
- FIPS code: 26-61060
- GNIS feature ID: 1626857
- Website: https://oregontwpmi.gov/

Oregon Township is a civil township of Lapeer County in the U.S. state of Michigan. The population was 5,712 at the 2020 Census.

== Geography ==
According to the United States Census Bureau, the township has a total area of 35.2 square miles (91 km^{2}), of which 33.2 square miles (86 km^{2}) is land and 2.1 square miles (5.4 km^{2}) (5.87%) is water.

== Demographics ==
As of the census of 2000, there were 6,166 people, 2,086 households, and 1,752 families residing in the township. The population density was 185.8 inhabitants per square mile (71.7/km^{2}). There were 2,187 housing units at an average density of 65.9 per square mile (25.4/km^{2}). The racial makeup of the township was 97.76% White, 0.06% African American, 0.42% Native American, 0.32% Asian, 0.55% from other races, and 0.88% from two or more races. Hispanic or Latino of any race were 2.01% of the population.

There were 2,086 households, out of which 41.5% had children under the age of 18 living with them, 73.7% were married couples living together, 6.5% had a female householder with no husband present, and 16.0% were non-families. 13.5% of all households were made up of individuals, and 3.3% had someone living alone who was 65 years of age or older. The average household size was 2.95 and the average family size was 3.23.

In the township the population was spread out, with 28.6% under the age of 18, 7.5% from 18 to 24, 30.2% from 25 to 44, 27.1% from 45 to 64, and 6.6% who were 65 years of age or older. The median age was 36 years. For every 100 females, there were 107.2 males. For every 100 females age 18 and over, there were 105.4 males.

The median income for a household in the township was $60,137, and the median income for a family was $63,125. Males had a median income of $50,392 versus $27,730 for females. The per capita income for the township was $22,788. About 4.6% of families and 5.7% of the population were below the poverty line, including 9.4% of those under age 18 and 3.8% of those age 65 or over.
