= Columbiaville, Michigan =

- Village
- Village of Columbiaville
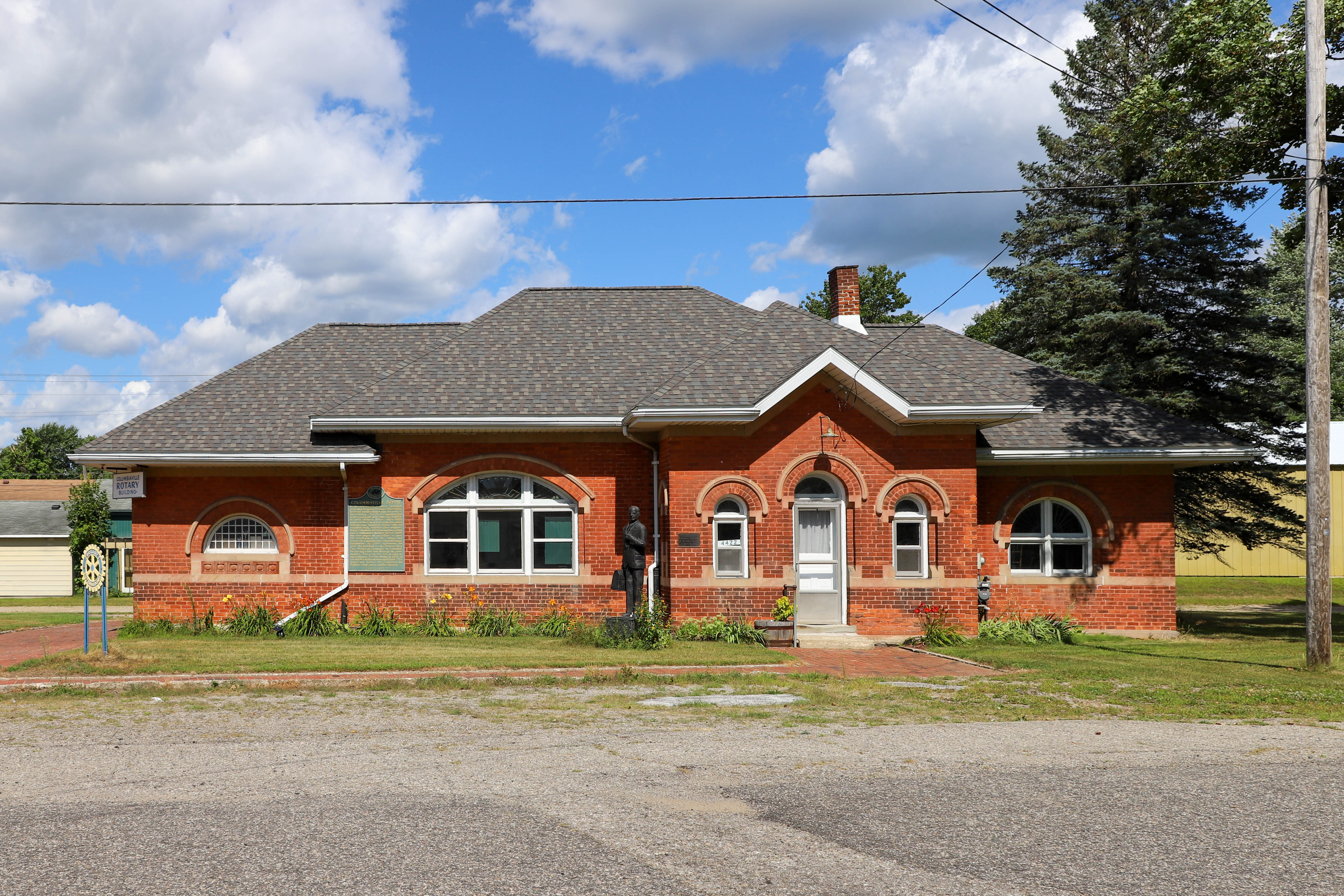
- The historic Columbiaville station

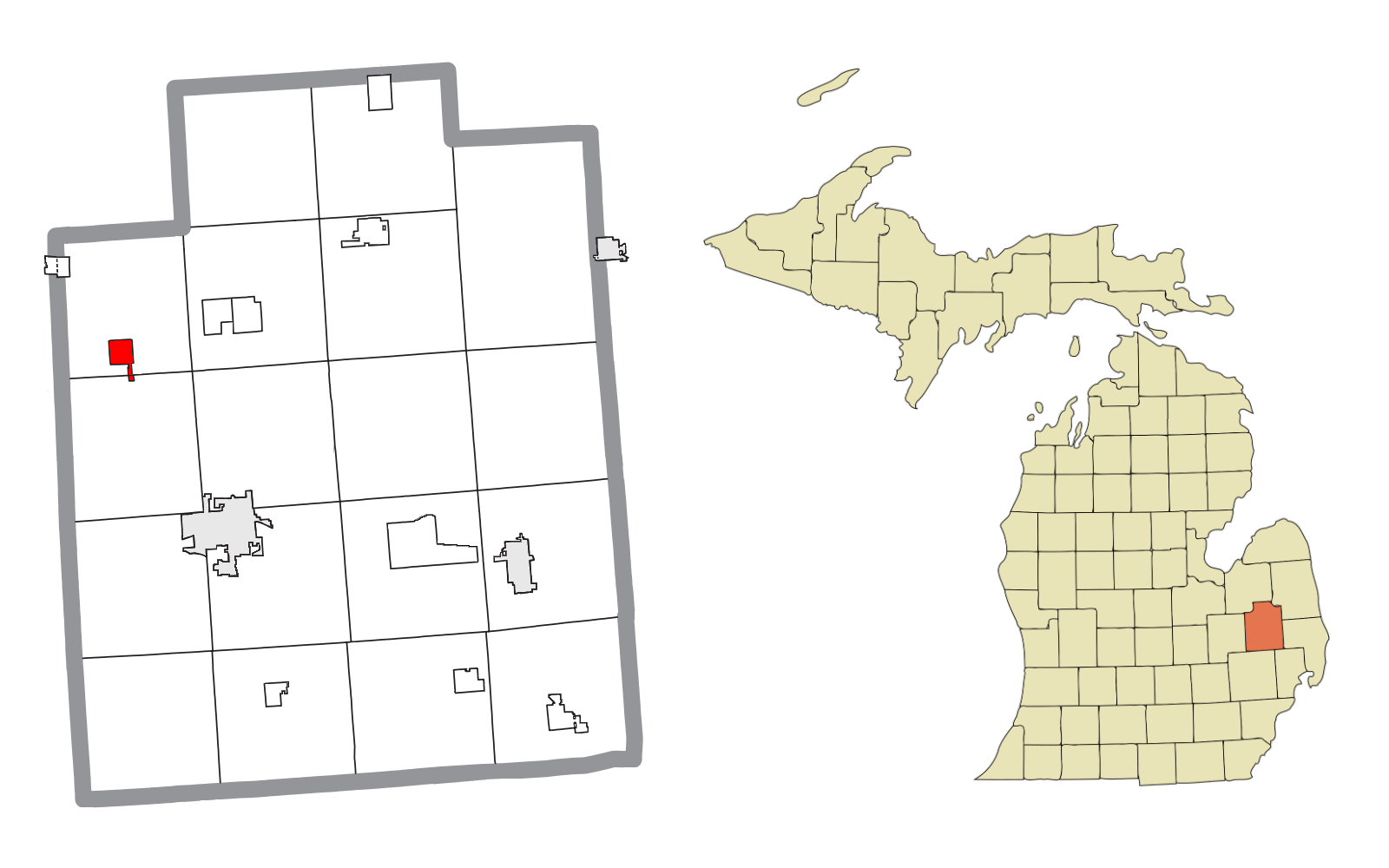
- Location within Lapeer County

- Location within the state of Michigan Location within the United States
- Coordinates: 43°09′25″N 83°24′33″W
- Country: United States
- State: Michigan
- County: Lapeer
- Townships: Marathon and Oregon
- Settled: 1847
- Incorporated: 1879

Government
  - Type: Village council
  - President: Tom Wood
  - Clerk: Denise Baker

Area
  - Total: 1.18 sq mi (3.05 km^{2})
  - Land: 0.88 sq mi (2.28 km^{2})
  - Water: 0.30 sq mi (0.77 km^{2})
- Elevation: 771 ft (235 m)

Population (2020)
  - Total: 702
  - Density: 797.73/sq mi (308.01/km^{2})
- Time zone: UTC-5 (Eastern (EST))
  - Summer (DST): UTC-4 (EDT)
- ZIP code(s): 48421
- Area code: 810
- FIPS code: 26-17460
- GNIS feature ID: 0623646
- Website: Official website

Columbiaville is a village in Lapeer County in the U.S. state of Michigan. The population was 702 at the 2020 census. Located along the Flint River, the village is mostly within Marathon Township with a small portion extending south into Oregon Township.

== History ==
The first settler on the site of the village was Levi D. Cutting, a carpenter and cabinet maker by trade, who arrived with his family in 1847. His home in Columbiaville is still standing at the south corner of Water and Lapeer Streets. In 1848, George and Henry Niver built a saw mill on the banks of the Flint River and the place became known as "Niverville". William Peter, a neighbor of the Nivers from their previous residence in Columbia County, New York came to work in the Niver's sawmill. By 1852, he opened his own business, starting with a store. He eventually came into possession of the entire property of Columbiaville.

A post office was established in April 1857 with the name "Columbiaville". The Nivers originally suggested the name "Columbia" after their home county in New York, but at the time there was already another post office in Michigan with that name.

The village continued to grow with the inclusion of a large Steam Grist and Flouring Mill, built by William Peter. The Detroit and Bay City Railroad chose to route through Columbiaville and was opened to the public in 1872. The first depot was a wooden structure located on the east side of the track at Pine Street. In 1893 the brick depot was erected by William Peter, with the provision in the deed that all passenger trains were to stop in Columbiaville. The railroad provided great means of transportation and opportunity for the village. In 1892 the Peters along with Toledo workmen, built the William Peter Mansion. They moved into the sixteen room Mansion in 1896. Mrs. Peter stated that the location of the home was chosen for convenience of being right downtown in the center of activity. Peter soon after became ill and died on October 23, 1899, at age 75. He is buried at Woodlawn Cemetery. The first automobile traveled into the village in 1903, and was not initially well accepted by all residents who were in fear of witch craft. The first gas station in the village was established in the early 1900s by Standard Oil Company. Early automobile dealers were Roy Osborne, who built a large garage and dealership display on Water Street in 1920. Thomas Ward established Willey's Overland Garage in the 1920s.

== Geography ==
According to the United States Census Bureau, the village has a total area of 1.15 square miles (2.98 km^{2}), of which 0.85 square miles (2.20 km^{2}) is land and 0.30 square miles (0.78 km^{2}) is water.

== Demographics ==
Historical population
Census	Pop.	Note	%±
1880	326		—
1890	578		77.3%
1900	457		−20.9%
1910	369		−19.3%
1920	656		77.8%
1930	477		−27.3%
1940	664		39.2%
1950	789		18.8%
1960	878		11.3%
1970	935		6.5%
1980	953		1.9%
1990	934		−2.0%
2000	815		−12.7%
2010	787		−3.4%
2020	702		−10.8%
U.S. Decennial Census

=== 2010 census ===
As of the census of 2010, there were 787 people, 299 households, and 207 families residing in the village. The population density was 925.9 inhabitants per square mile (357.5/km^{2}). There were 335 housing units at an average density of 394.1 per square mile (152.2/km^{2}). The racial makeup of the village was 95.2% White, 0.4% Native American, 0.1% Asian, 2.5% from other races, and 1.8% from two or more races. Hispanic or Latino of any race were 4.6% of the population.

There were 299 households, of which 35.5% had children under the age of 18 living with them, 48.5% were married couples living together, 13.4% had a female householder with no husband present, 7.4% had a male householder with no wife present, and 30.8% were non-families. 27.1% of all households were made up of individuals, and 13% had someone living alone who was 65 years of age or older. The average household size was 2.63 and the average family size was 3.18.

The median age in the village was 36.4 years. 27.1% of residents were under the age of 18; 9.2% were between the ages of 18 and 24; 25.7% were from 25 to 44; 26.1% were from 45 to 64; and 11.9% were 65 years of age or older. The gender makeup of the village was 47.8% male and 52.2% female.

=== 2000 census ===
As of the census of 2000, there were 815 people, 304 households, and 216 families residing in the village. The population density was 940.8 inhabitants per square mile (363.2/km^{2}). There were 328 housing units at an average density of 378.6 per square mile (146.2/km^{2}). The racial makeup of the village was 96.07% White, 0.25% African American, 0.49% Native American, 0.74% Asian, 1.23% from other races, and 1.23% from two or more races. Hispanic or Latino of any race were 1.60% of the population.

There were 304 households, out of which 36.8% had children under the age of 18 living with them, 53.9% were married couples living together, 14.1% had a female householder with no husband present, and 28.9% were non-families. 24.3% of all households were made up of individuals, and 10.2% had someone living alone who was 65 years of age or older. The average household size was 2.68 and the average family size was 3.20.

In the village, the population was spread out, with 28.0% under the age of 18, 8.7% from 18 to 24, 33.1% from 25 to 44, 19.5% from 45 to 64, and 10.7% who were 65 years of age or older. The median age was 33 years. For every 100 females, there were 91.3 males. For every 100 females age 18 and over, there were 85.8 males.

The median income for a household in the village was $39,844, and the median income for a family was $45,750. Males had a median income of $40,156 versus $20,000 for females. The per capita income for the village was $16,216. About 3.2% of families and 4.3% of the population were below the poverty line, including 2.7% of those under age 18 and 4.2% of those age 65 or over.
