= 2022 Gaylord tornado =

2022 EF3 tornado in Gaylord, Michigan

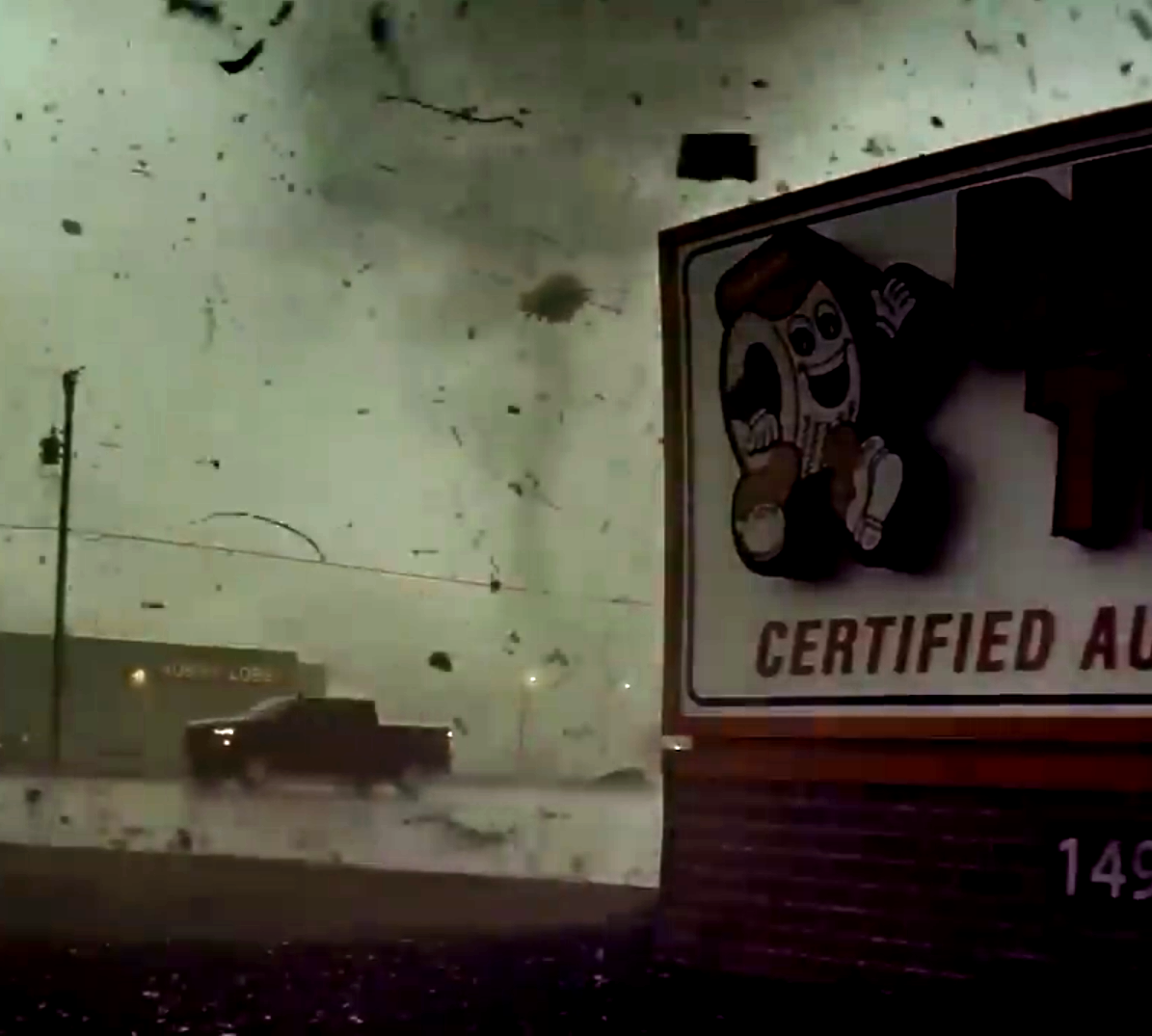
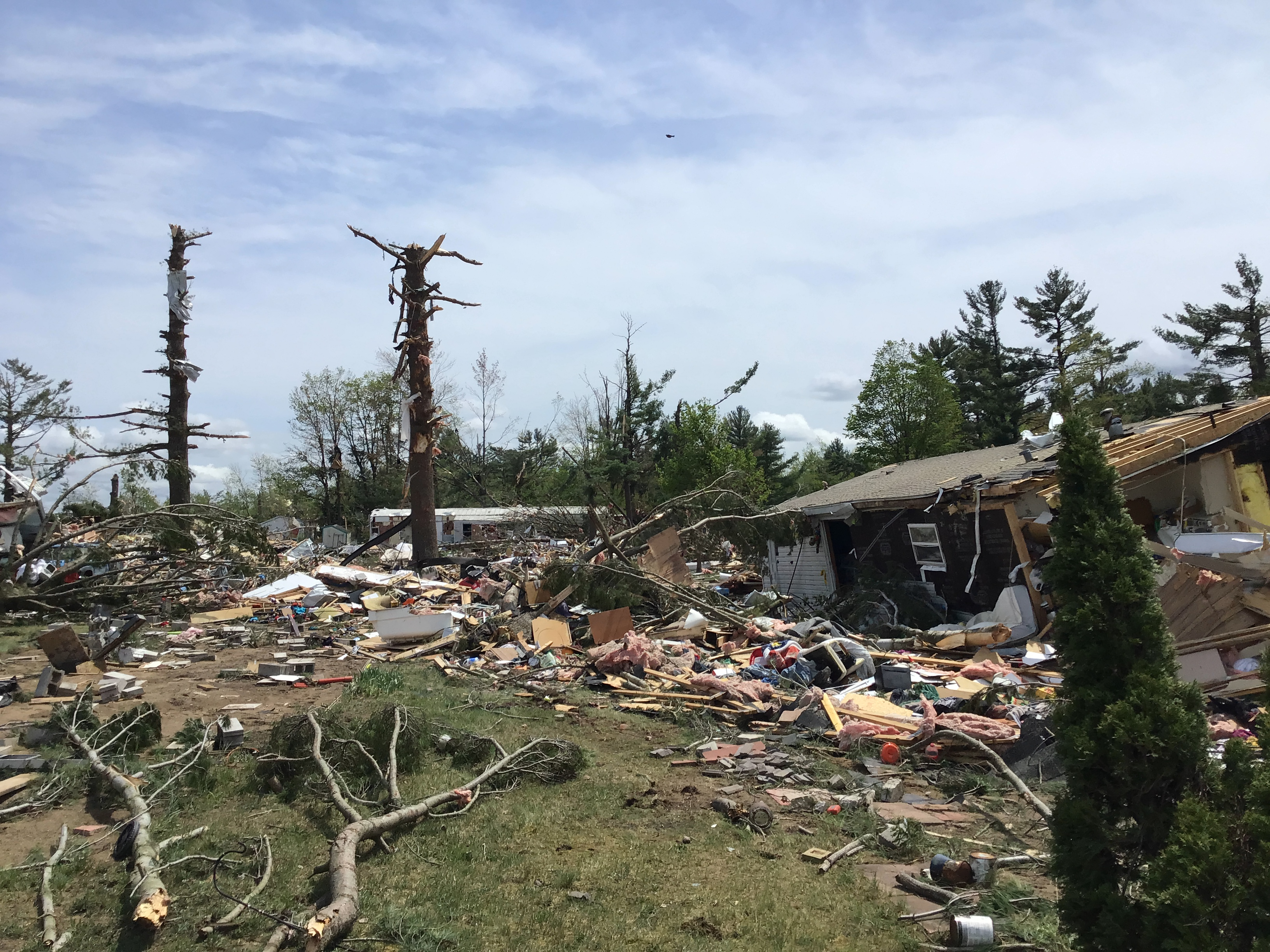
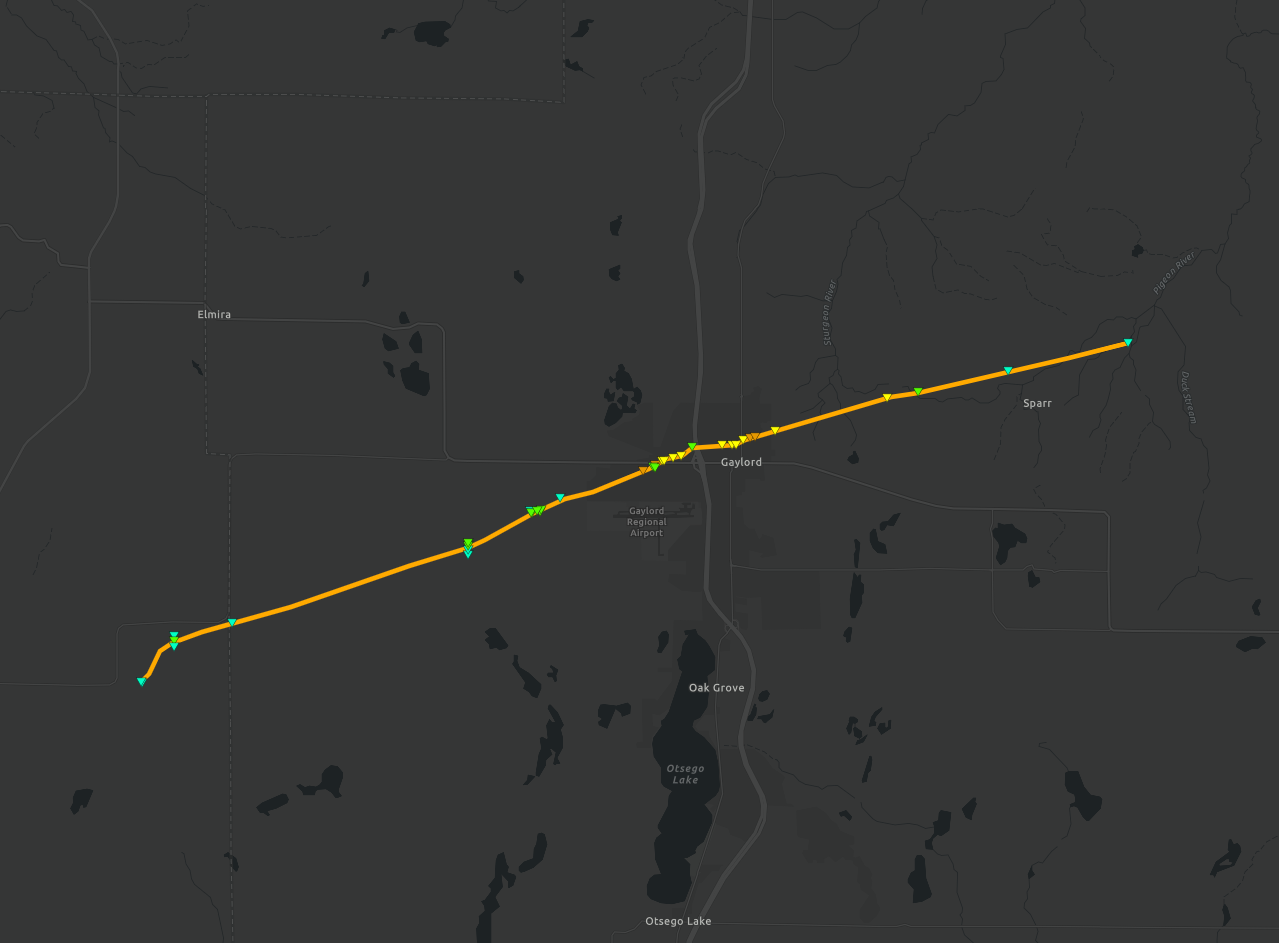
- Clockwise from top: The tornado in Gaylord, as seen from a Tesla Model 3 camera; The track of the tornado; Devastating damage to a mobile home community in Gaylord

Meteorological history
- Formed: May 20, 2022, 3:35 p.m. EDT (UTC−04:00)
- Dissipated: May 20, 2022, 3:57 p.m. EDT (UTC−04:00)
- Duration: 22 minutes

EF3 tornado
- on the Enhanced Fujita scale
- Max width: 200 yards (0.11 mi; 0.18 km)
- Path length: 17.54 miles (28.23 km)
- Highest winds: 150 mph (240 km/h)

Overall effects
- Fatalities: 2
- Injuries: 44
- Damage: $50.175 million (2022 USD)
- Areas affected: Antrim County, Michigan; Otsego County, Michigan, particularly Gaylord
- Power outages: 6,100
- Houses destroyed: 33
- Part of the Tornadoes of 2022

During the mid-afternoon hours of May 20, 2022, an unusually intense and destructive tornado tracked 17.54 miles (28.23 km) through portions of Antrim and Otsego counties in Michigan, United States, directly impacting the city of Gaylord. The tornado killed two people, injured 44 others, and inflicted $50.175 million (2022 USD) (Note: All amounts of money are in 2022 USD unless stated otherwise.) in damages, becoming the first EF3 tornado to occur in Michigan in over a decade, and the first tornado to strike Gaylord since reliable records began in 1950. The tornado damaged 210 homes and 30 businesses along its path, including a Hobby Lobby, Goodwill, Maurices, and Jimmy John's. Of the 210 homes impacted, 33 were completely destroyed, and the tornado knocked out power for around 6,100 customers. A mobile home community was devastated, where the two fatalities occurred. The tornado was the deadliest to occur in Michigan since May 13, 1980, when an F3 tornado impacted the city of Kalamazoo.

The tornado first touched down in Antrim County near Alba, Michigan, inflicting minor damage to trees and homes before crossing Old Alba Road into Otsego County, where it damaged several homes at EF1 intensity. The tornado inflicted scattered damage to trees and structures before intensifying as it entered the Nottingham Forest mobile home community, completely demolishing several mobile homes at low-end EF3 strength. In this area, two people were killed. The tornado continued into the business district of Gaylord, striking the Pine Ridge Square Shopping Center where several businesses, including a Hobby Lobby, Jimmy John's, and Maurices, were damaged or destroyed. The tornado weakened to EF2 intensity as it damaged several more businesses, with Performance Plus Quick Oil Change having all its exterior walls collapsed.

A Goodwill and Aldi were damaged, and numerous recreational vehicles at Northern Michigan RV were impacted, with one being tossed across a nearby highway. The tornado then crossed I-75 and began to enter more residential areas, where several homes sustained severe damage. The tornado reached its peak intensity along Berkshire Lane, where a home was nearly completely demolished at mid-range EF3 strength. The tornado then began a weakening trend, damaging several more residences and blowing a three-car garage off its foundation before entering more rural areas. The tornado damaged numerous trees at EF0–EF1 intensity before dissipating northeast of Sparr after being on the ground for 22 minutes.

== Meteorological synopsis ==
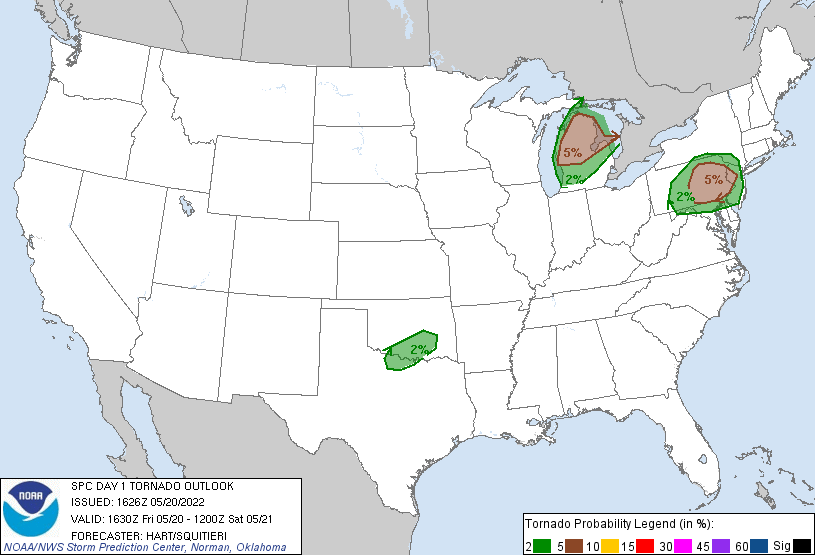
Probabilistic Tornado Graphic on 12:30 p.m., May 20, 2022

From May 19–20, 2022, a trough moved through the northern Great Plains and upper midwest regions, creating a strong low-pressure system that tracked from the Great Plains into Ontario, Canada, which assisted in bringing atmospheric moisture into Michigan.

On the morning of May 20, the Storm Prediction Center outlined a slight risk for severe weather that covered the majority of the lower Michigan peninsula. Additionally, an area with a 5% chance for a tornado within 25 miles of a point was outlined for central and northern portions of the peninsula, as the cold front moved in from the Great Lakes and abundant wind shear was present. As the day progressed, the Storm Prediction Center shifted the slight risk for severe weather and the 5% risk for tornadoes within 25 miles of a point further north, encircling the northern portions of the lower Michigan peninsula as the strong cold front extending from southern Wisconsin to the lower Michigan peninsula tracked through the region, with sufficient atmospheric moisture, unusually strong wind shear, and atmospheric instability being present.

Thunderstorms first began to develop west of Lake Michigan on the morning of May 20, and strengthened while tracking northeastward as the day went on. The supercell that produced the Gaylord tornado developed during the afternoon, and produced strong winds, large hail, and eventually the tornado that tracked through Gaylord, which touched down at 3:35 p.m.

== Tornado summary ==
The tornado first touched down at 3:35 p.m. EDT (Note: All times listed in the article are in EDT unless stated otherwise.) in Antrim County around 4 miles (6.4 km) east of Alba, and just north of Olds Road and east of Alba Highway. The tornado began inflicting EF0 damage to trees and a mobile home as it tracked northeastward. The tornado turned sharper to the east as it crossed Patterson Road, where it snapped softwood trees and damaged homes at EF1 strength. The tornado tracked 1.75 miles (2.82 km) through Antrim County before crossing Old Alba Road as it entered Otsego County, tearing panels off the roof of a barn.

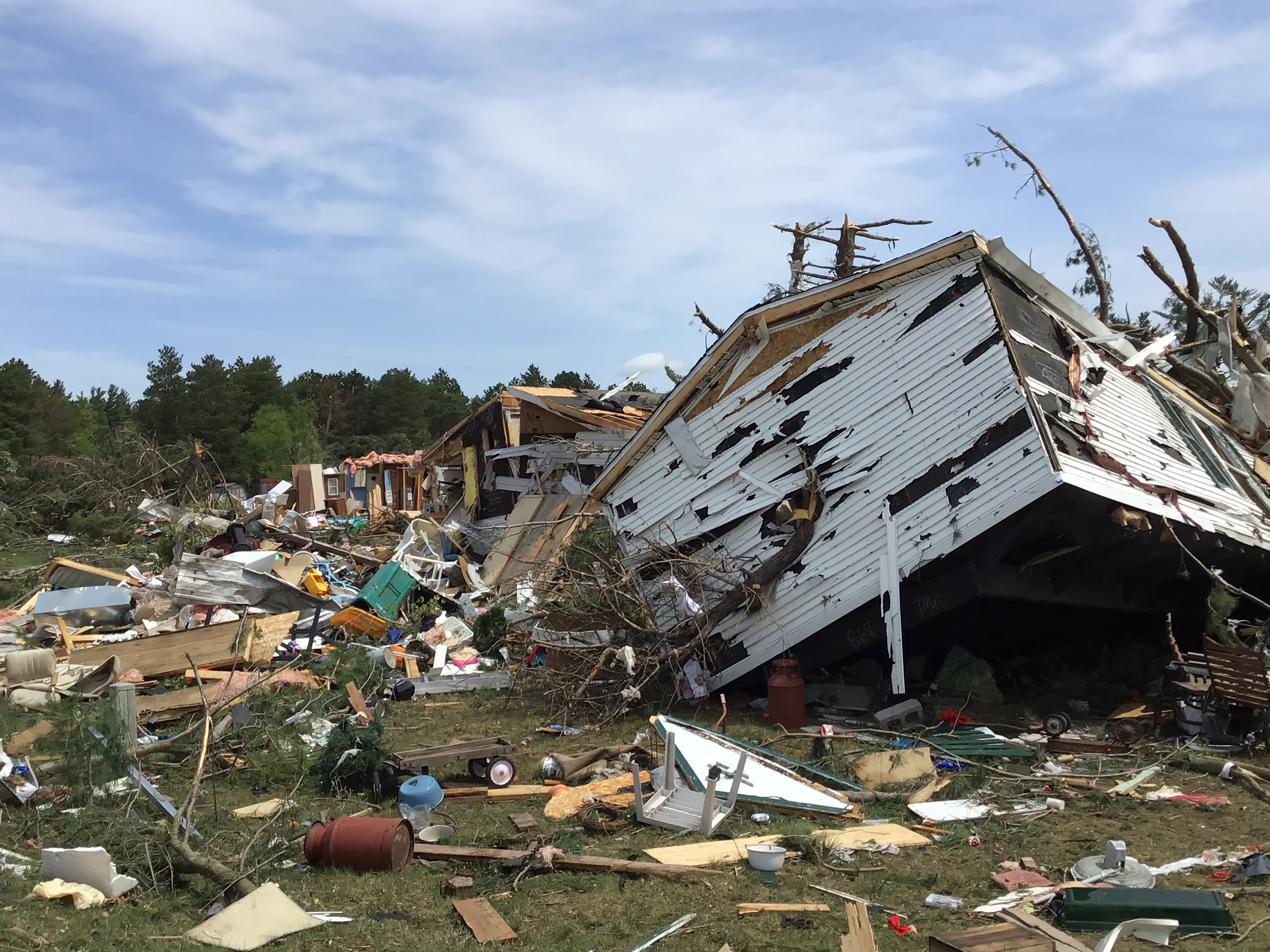
Devastating damage to the Nottingham Forest mobile home community

The tornado continued northeastward, inflicting EF1 damage to trees as it crossed Hayes Tower Road. The tornado crossed Millbocker Road before approaching and tracking across Shady Brook Lane, where several homes and trees suffered EF1 damage. The tornado damaged the roof of a barn along Van Tyle Road as it tracked northeast, intensifying as it crossed Nottingham Road West and entered the Nottingham Forest mobile home community in Gaylord. Several mobile homes were completely destroyed at low-end EF3 intensity, with the debris being blown away and two people being killed. The tornado continued into western portions of Gaylord, damaging trees and vehicles before crossing McVannel Road and damaging the Pine Ridge Square Shopping Center at EF3 intensity with estimated wind speeds of 145 mph (233 km/h). The back wall of a Hobby Lobby collapsed, and the north-facing wall sustained significant damage. The Jimmy John's and Maurices locations near the Hobby Lobby suffered severe damage, with several exterior walls collapsing and portions of the roof being torn away while people were inside shopping. A cellphone tower at a nearby electric company building was bent in half by the tornado. The tornado tracked deeper into the Gaylord business district at EF2 intensity, crossing M-32 and impacting the Performance Plus Quick Oil Change building, resulting in the exterior walls collapsing, leaving only interior walls standing. The tornado then struck the Goodwill building, with the roof and front portions of the store collapsing after the tornado damaged parts of the exterior walls. The tornado then impacted the Aldi building along Winefred Road, damaging the back wall and snapping numerous trees outside the location. The tornado crossed Winefred Road, inflicting significant damage to buildings at the Brink Mini Storage location, with one being completely destroyed.

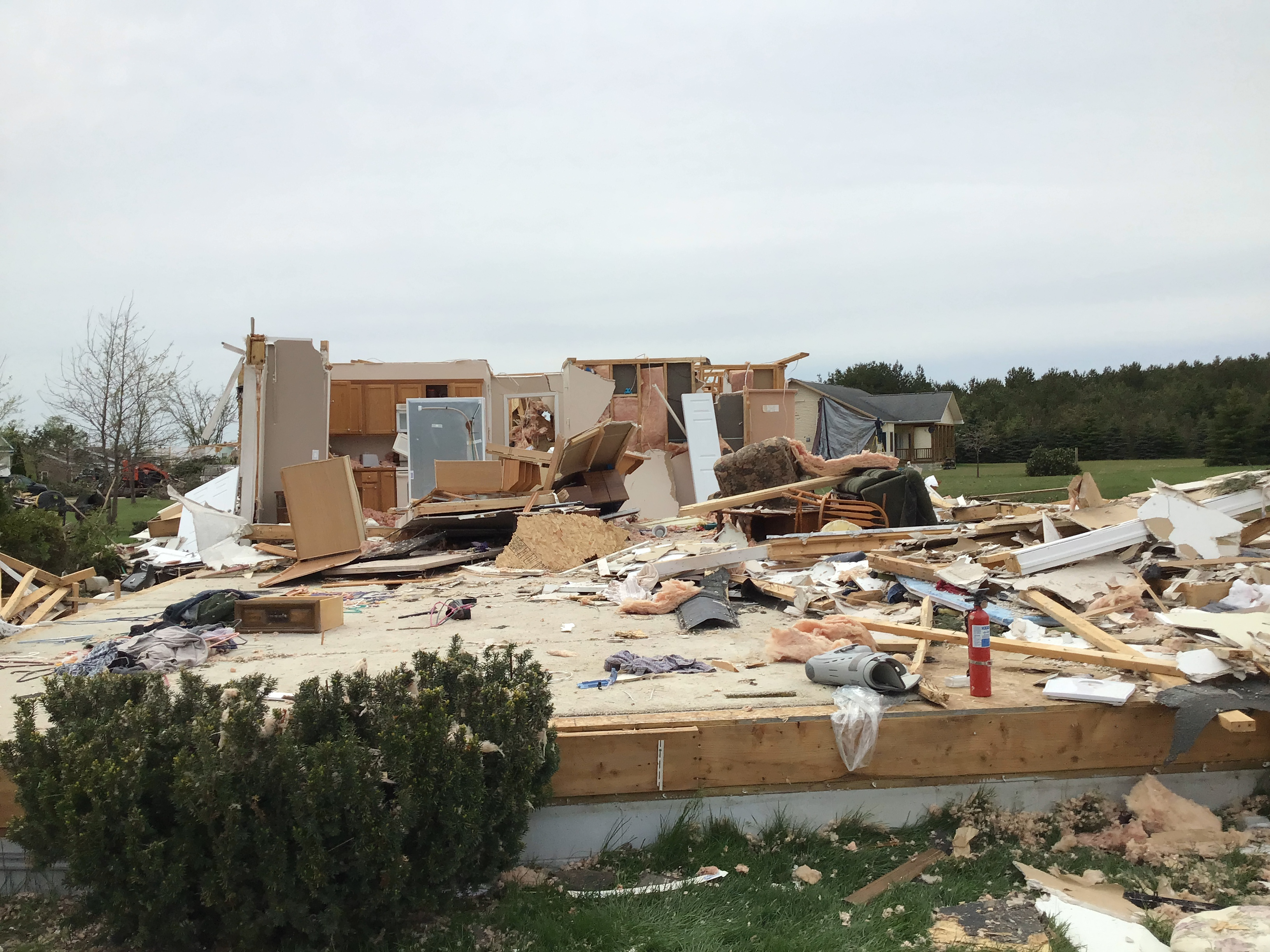
A home that was destroyed at EF3 intensity, with wind speeds of 150 mph (240 km/h) being estimated at this location

The tornado continued northeastward, crossing Ted Drive and Expressway Court before impacting the Northern Michigan RV location, where countless recreational vehicles were thrown and damaged, including one that was tossed across I-75. The tornado turned more to the east as it crossed I-75, moving into the central residential areas of Gaylord. The tornado crossed North Ohio Avenue and North Illinois Avenue, inflicting significant damage to numerous trees near the corner of Jenson Street. The tornado tracked across the Detroit and Mackinac Railway before significantly damaging homes along North Otsego Avenue at EF2 strength, with one residence being displaced off its foundation. The tornado then crossed North Court Avenue, with a home on the west side of the street having its detached garage completely demolished. Another home along the street had the entire roof ripped away. The tornado tracked just north of the East Mill Street/North Elm Avenue intersection before impacting a home along the south side of Berkshire Lane at EF3 intensity. The home's roof was entirely removed, and several exterior walls collapsed. The tornado crossed Berkshire Lane and reached peak intensity on the northern side of the street, where a home was nearly completely demolished from estimated wind speeds of 150 mph (240 km/h), with only portions of the kitchen, hallway, and bathroom walls remaining. The garage was entirely destroyed, and debris were carried along the tornado's path. The tornado crossed Hayes Road before tracking over South Classic Drive, with a home on the east side of the street being shifted off its foundation. The tornado tracked across mostly forested areas before impacting a home along the west side of Goslow Street, with the deck and portions of the roof being removed. The home's three-car garage was completely swept off its foundation, with the debris being blown across the street.

The tornado continued through forested areas, inflicting EF1 damage to numerous trees as it crossed Kujawa Road. The tornado tracked just north of Sparr, continuing to damage trees at EF0 intensity before dissipating just northeast of Sparr and near Shade Creek at 3:57 p.m. The tornado reached a maximum width of 200 yards (180 m) in both Antrim and Otsego County, tracked for 17.54 miles (28.23 km), and caused two fatalities and 44 injuries within Gaylord.

== Aftermath ==
=== Damage ===
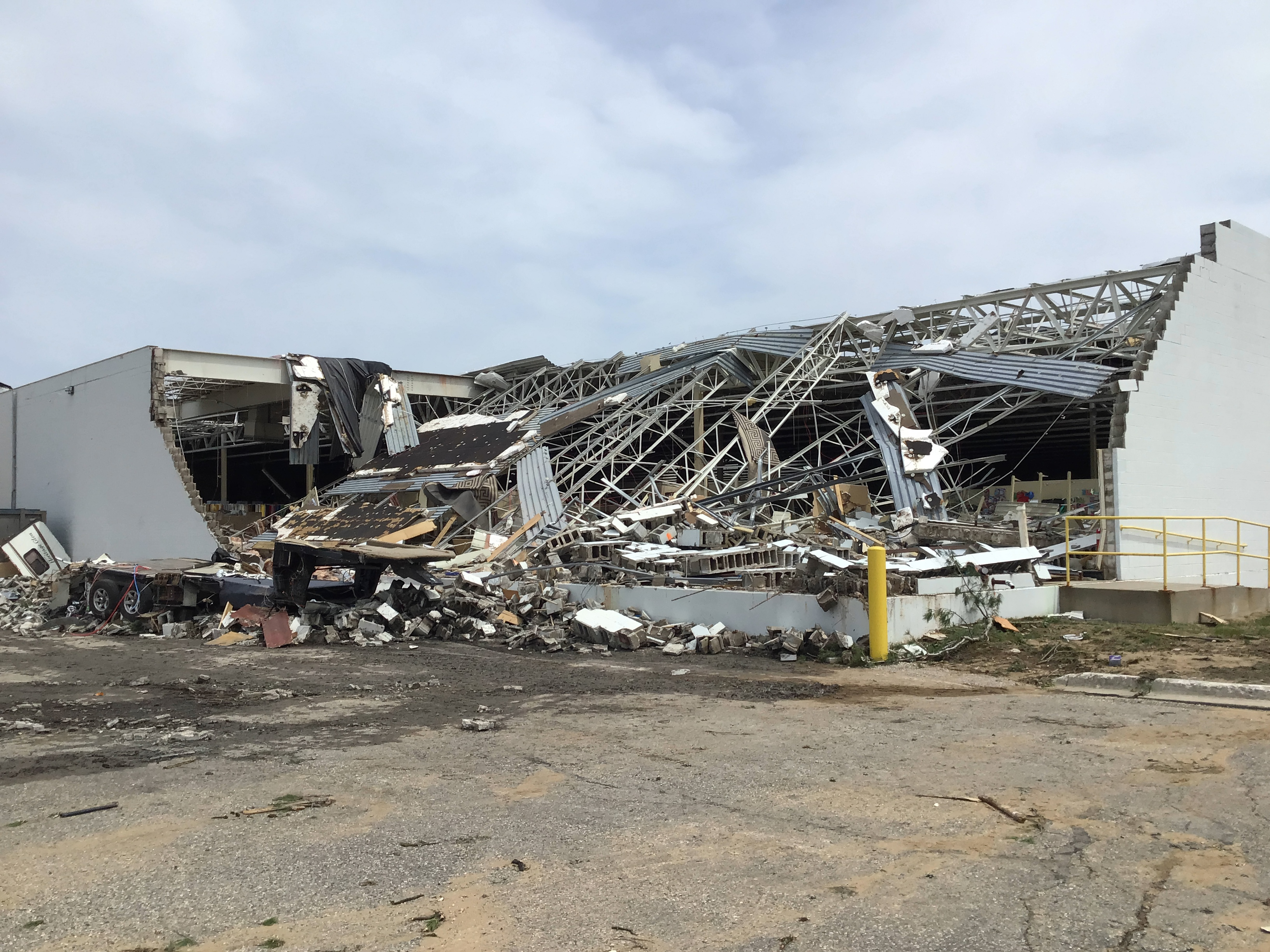
Severe damage to the Hobby Lobby in Gaylord

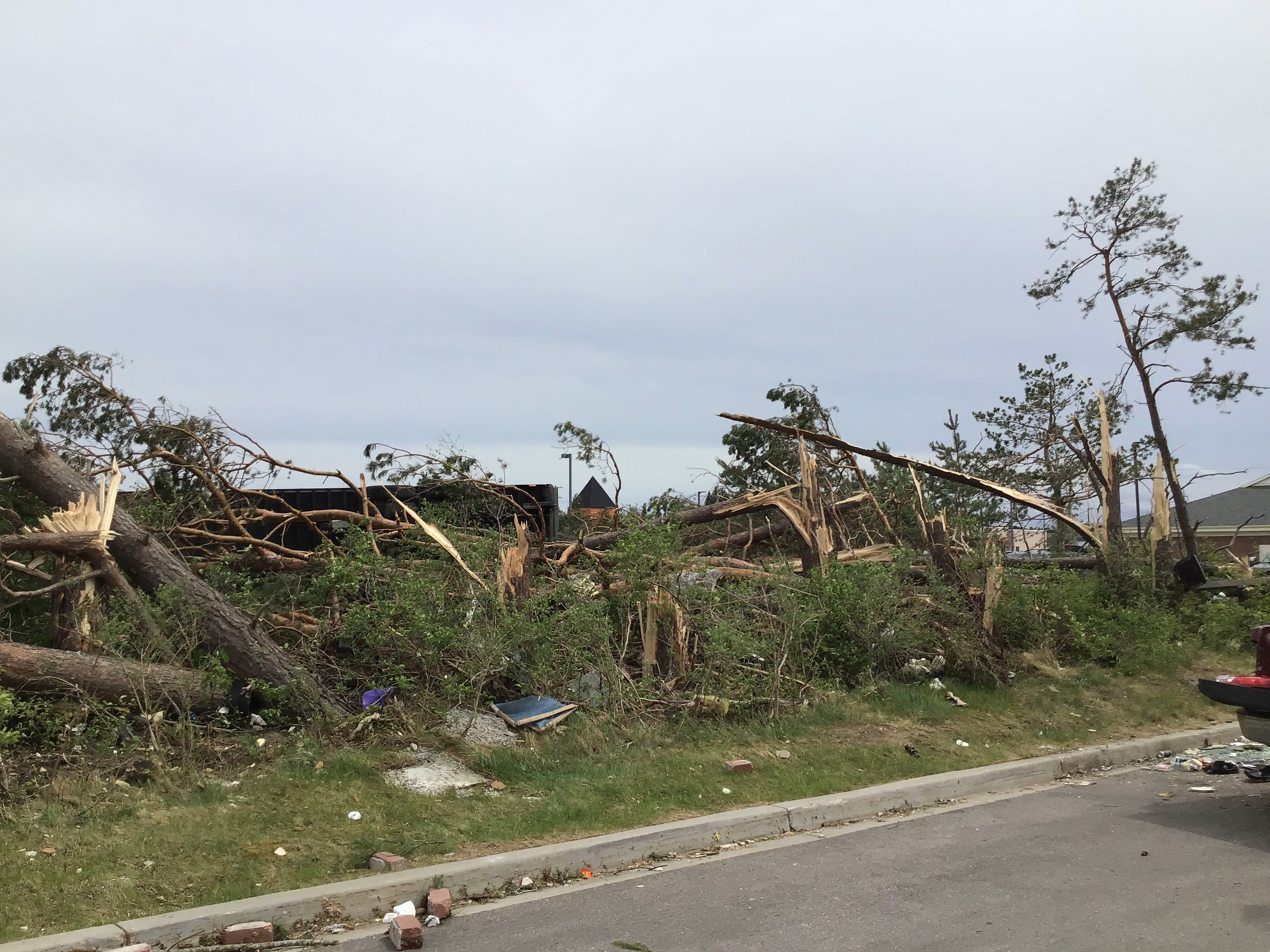
Extensive damage to trees in Gaylord

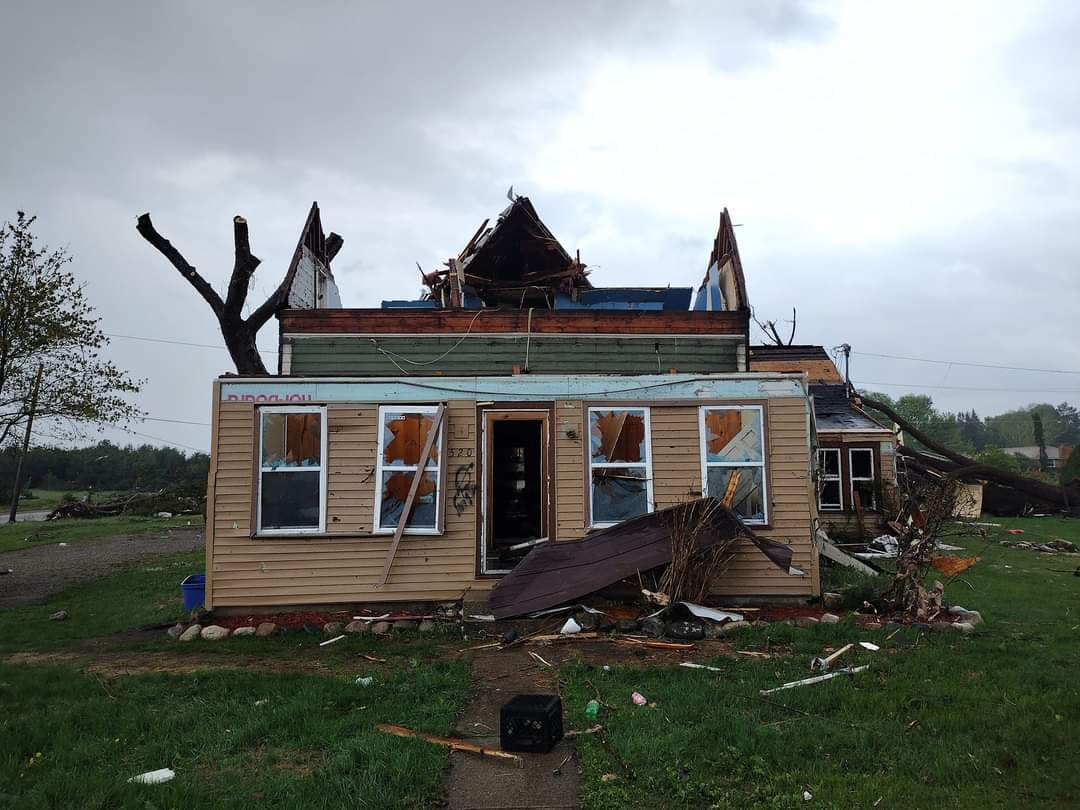
A home in Gaylord that sustained EF2 damage

Along its track, the tornado damaged 210 homes, including 33 that were completely destroyed and 30 that sustained damage to 50% of their structure. The tornado damaged 30 businesses, with several being completely destroyed. Several homes and buildings sustained EF3 damage, making the tornado the first EF3 in Michigan since 2012. The Nottingham Forest mobile home community, which consisted of 75 homes, was partially demolished. Several units were lifted and turned over, with some being completely destroyed. A Hobby Lobby building had several well-constructed exterior walls destroyed, and portions of the roof were torn away. A Jimmy John's and Maurices nearby suffered similar destruction, with exterior walls being collapsed and segments of the roof being destroyed. The Performance Plus Quick Oil Change location was totaled, with the majority of the structure collapsing besides a few interior walls.

The Goodwill location in Gaylord was significantly damaged, with portions of the exterior walls being destroyed and the roof on the front half of the building collapsing. An Aldi location suffered extensive damage to the back exterior wall, and numerous trees on the property were snapped. Brink Mini Storage had numerous buildings sustain significant damage to their roofs and exterior walls, with at least one being completely demolished. At Northern Michigan RV, many recreational vehicles were thrown and damaged by the tornado, including one that was tossed across the nearby highway. The Alter-Start North auto shop had portions of the back wall destroyed and the entire roof torn off. A Little Caesar’s Pizza location suffered shattered windows, and countless trees were snapped and destroyed. Numerous vehicles were damaged and tossed by the tornado, and around 6,100 customers in Otsego County lost power.

In total, the tornado inflicted $50.175 million in damages, of which $175,000 occurred in Antrim County and $50 million occurred in Otsego County.

=== Recovery efforts ===
In the hours following the tornado, search and rescue operations began, with first responders rescuing several individuals from the Nottingham Forest mobile home community while natural gas leaked into the surrounding air. Additionally, rescuers searched through the destroyed Home Depot. Those who were injured by the tornado were transported by ambulances to four different hospitals in the area.

The tornado occurred during an emergency personnel shift change, which resulted in twice as many first responders available at the scene. Gaylord City Police, Gaylord Department of Public Works, Michigan State Police, the city's volunteer fire department, and several other agencies responded to the tornado. A curfew was put in place shortly after the tornado, and all roads leading into Gaylord were closed off by police barricades.

American Red Cross volunteers responded after the tornado, setting up a shelter at E-Free Church for displaced residents. Additionally, the church offered warm food, hygiene items, and diapers to anyone in need. Consumers Energy distributed free barbecue meals to victims of the tornado. Michigan Governor Gretchen Whitmer declared a state of emergency following the severe weather, and toured the damage within Gaylord. On the afternoon of May 21, Michigan Lieutenant Governor Garlin Gilchrist visited Gaylord to assess the destruction, and organized a press conference to discuss recovery efforts. By May 22, every resident was accounted for and power was restored to the majority of the city.

Volunteers from all across the state of Michigan contributed in cleanup and recovery within Gaylord. Otsego County United Way operated out of E-Free Church, collecting materials such as batteries, chargers, blankets, food, and equipment for cleanup to distribute throughout the community. Additionally, the organization gave out gift cards and prepaid cell phones to allow affected individuals to purchase necessities and make calls to relatives.

On June 8, Governor Gretchen Whitmer requested to President Joe Biden that a major disaster declaration be put in place for Otsego County, so affected residents had access to grants for rebuilding and temporary housing, loans with low costs to cover uninsured property loss, and other materials and programs to assist individuals who were impacted. The Federal Emergency Management Agency (FEMA) conducted a damage assessment and determined that the request could not be fulfilled, leading to a denial on July 8.

An estimated several 100 to over 1,000 trees were destroyed by the tornado, leading the city of Gaylord to partnering with Huron Pines, a northern Michigan conservation group, to assist in planting new trees.

Nine months after the tornado, the Gaylord Longterm Recovery Group, along with E-Free Church and The Red Cross, raised a total of nearly $2 million dollars for individuals impacted by the tornado. Around $600,000 was spent to repair damages, and $900,000 was put into responses immediately after the tornado. Starting July 5, the Michigan Manufactured Housing Association matched a dollar to every one donated to the Otsego Community Foundation’s Tornado Response Fund, up to $20,000, and worked with local officials to solve issues with mobile home communities in the county. Donations came in from various organizations and businesses in the Michigan mobile home industry.

The Hobby Lobby, Jimmy John's, and Maurices at the Pine Ridge Square Shopping Center were rebuilt due to the damage sustained, with construction taking nearly two years, finishing on March 14, 2024. The Jimmy John's was relocated to a nearby Marathon gas station, and Maurices was moved to a larger building. The Hobby Lobby was reconstructed, along with the addition of a new 9,636 square feet (895.2 m^{2}) Five Below store. Performance Plus Quick Oil Change was completely demolished, and a new building was built at the same location. Other businesses, such as Aldi, were fully repaired and back open several months after the tornado.

Otsego County officials considered installing tornado sirens for the city following the event, but they were deemed not financially affordable, as it would take an estimated $27,000 for each siren, which individually cover a 0.78 mile radius.

=== Casualties ===
In Gaylord, two people in their 70s were killed by the tornado after it tracked through the Nottingham Mobile Home Park, making it the deadliest tornado in Michigan since May 13, 1980, when an F3 tornado tracked through downtown Kalamazoo, killing five people.

In addition to the fatalities, 44 individuals sustained injuries from the tornado, including one man who was paralyzed. Following the tornado, 23 patients were treated for their injuries at Otsego Memorial Hospital, 12 people were treated at Grayling Hospital, eight people were treated at McLaren Northern Michigan Petoskey, and one patient was treated at Munson Medical Center.

== See also ==
- 1980 Kalamazoo tornado – a deadly F3 tornado that caused five fatalities in downtown Kalamazoo
