= 1980 Kalamazoo tornado =

Fatal F3 tornado in Michigan

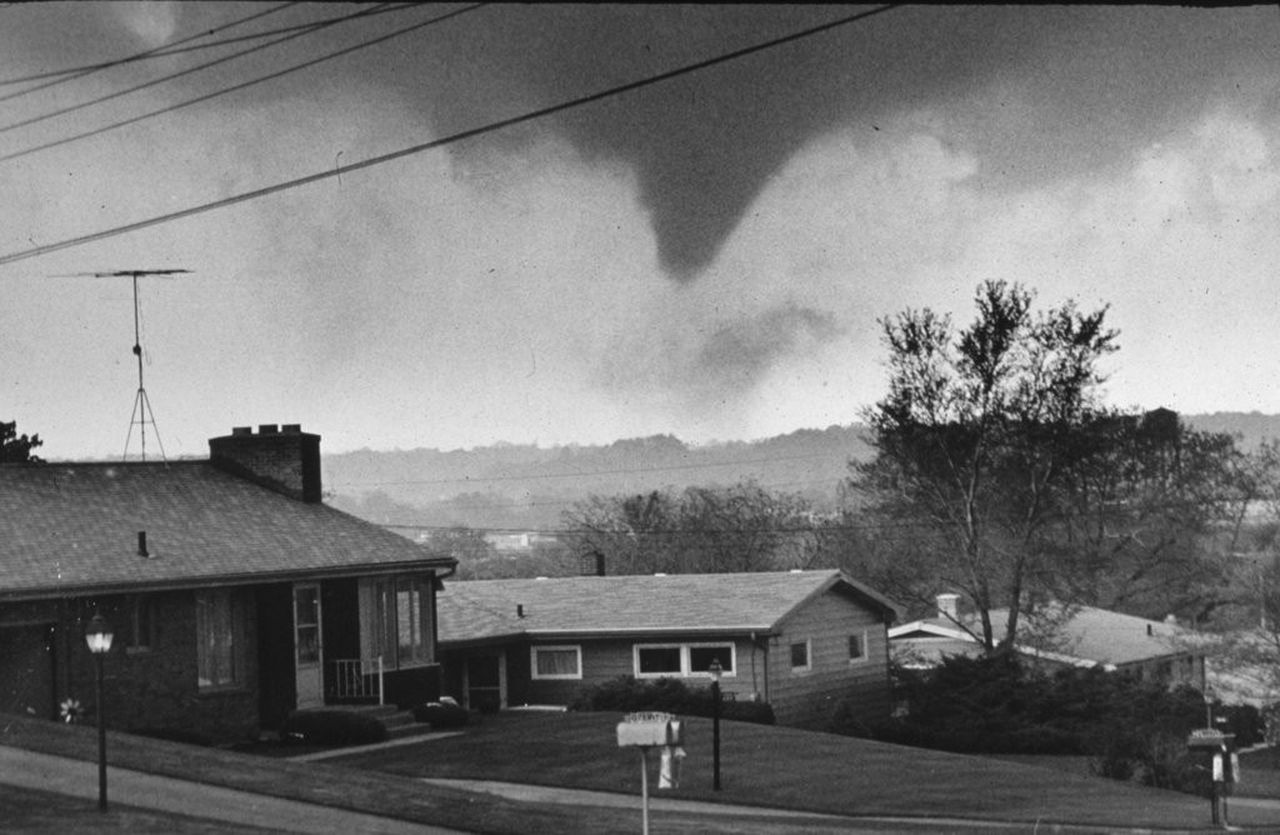
- Clockwise from top: The tornado as viewed from Parchment; Damage to the back of the Gilmore Brothers Department Store in downtown Kalamazoo; An aerial view of downtown Kalamazoo in the aftermath of the tornado; Significant damage to the St. Augustine Cathedral School campus in Kalamazoo

Meteorological history
- Formed: May 13, 1980; 3:58 p.m. EDT (UTC–04:00)
- Dissipated: May 13, 1980; 4:25 p.m. EDT (UTC–04:00)
- Duration: 27 minutes

F3 tornado
- on the Fujita scale
- Max width: 450 yd (410 m)
- Path length: 10.6 mi (17.1 km)
- Highest winds: 158–206 mph (254–332 km/h)

Overall effects
- Fatalities: 5
- Injuries: 79
- Damage: $50 million (1980 USD)
- Areas affected: Kalamazoo County, Michigan
- Part of the Tornadoes of 1980

During the mid afternoon hours of May 13, 1980, a relatively small, yet deadly tornado moved directly through downtown Kalamazoo, Michigan, United States, as well as striking some parts of rural Kalamazoo County. Across its short, yet nearly 11 mile path throughout the area, the tornado was on the ground for approximately 27 minutes and killed five people while injuring 79 others. The total damages from the tornado were around $50 million (1980 USD).

== Meteorological synopsis ==
=== Upper-air analyses ===
==== Morning analysis ====
At 8:00 a.m. EDT on May 13, 1980, a stationary front was positioned over the northern portions of Illinois, Indiana, and Ohio. A low pressure area, visible in a surface analysis of the region, was present over Iowa, with an accompanying cold front extending into Missouri. An 850-millibar analysis of temperature gradients at this time revealed a trough over the Northern Plains, with significant advection of warm air taking placing over the Southeastern United States. Michigan was located directly in the middle of a tight temperature gradient to the east of the trough. At this level, winds of 40–45 knots were observed over the lower Ohio Valley. 500-millibar analysis at 8:00 a.m. revealed that the trough axis (Note: A trough axis is the line in a trough that connects the areas of lowest height or pressure.) of a low pressure system existed over the upper Midwest. A jet max of 70–75 knots overspread New England, and a lesser jet max (Note: A jet max is the maximum winds found in a jet streak, also known as a shortwave trough. A jet streak is a faster-moving current of air within a jet stream.) of 65 knots existed over southern Illinois and Missouri. In between these two areas of maximum winds, a coupled jet stream structure formed, which likely contributed to the vertical motion that caused thunderstorms to form in the afternoon hours of May 13.

==== Evening analysis ====
By 8:00 p.m. EDT, the surface low and associated cold front had moved through Michigan. An intense temperature gradient was still existent at the 850-millibar level, and the maximum winds had decreased, with 30–35 knot winds overspreading the lower Ohio Valley and Mid-Atlantic regions. At the 500-millibar altitude, a wind maximum of 65–70 knots was observed over Ohio and Pennsylvania, and a 115-knot wind maximum was present at 250 millibars over Indiana and Ohio.

=== Episode narrative ===
In the hours leading up to the tornado, a low-pressure system progressed over southern Michigan, facilitating the development of thunderstorms in the region. Surface maps at 8:00 a.m. EDT indicated the presence of a low-pressure system centered over eastern Iowa, with a quasi-stationary front (Note: A quasi-stationary front is a type of stationary front that is almost ("quasi") stationary, but still exhibits very slow movement.) extending to the east over the southern half of Lower Michigan. Near this front, fog and mist were reported, suggesting low LCL heights and significant moisture concentrations. Surface conditions remained the same through 9:00 a.m., and by 10:00 a.m., the low-pressure area centered over Iowa had moved into northwest Illinois. South of the stationary front, temperatures began to rise.
