= Imlay City Community Schools =

School district in Michigan

Address
- 634 West Borland Road Imlay City, Lapeer County, Michigan, 48444; United States

District information
- Grades: Pre-Kindergarten-12
- Superintendent: Dr. Stu Cameron
- Schools: 5
- Budget: $37,642,000 2022-2023 expenditures
- NCES District ID: 2619100

Students and staff
- Students: 1,782 (2024-2025)
- Teachers: 89.96 (on an FTE basis) (2024-2025)
- Staff: 247.59 FTE (2024-2025)
- Student–teacher ratio: 19.81 (2024-2025)

Other information
- Website: www.icschools.us

Imlay City Community Schools is a public school district in Lapeer County, Michigan. It serves Imlay City and parts of the townships of Almont, Arcadia, Attica, Goodland, and Imlay.

== History ==
In 1870, real estate developers founded the first school in Imlay City. Attendance grew quickly and it was soon at capacity, prompting a public school to be established the next year. The 1871 school was a two-story frame building, and in 1886 it was incorporated into a new brick school building. A little shed was built in the back for kindergarten. In 1906, the 1871 portion of the building was torn down and the lumber recycled as a new addition to the brick building. The kindergarten shed was moved and became the garage of a nearby home.

A new high school opened in fall 1923 on the west side of Bancroft Street north of Fifth Street, replacing the former school, which was torn down. A small vocational building was added on its west side in 1952.

The Imlay City Middle School first served as the district's high school when it opened in fall 1958. Weston Elementary was built in 1964, followed by Borland Elementary in 1973. The current Imlay City High School opened in 1993. The 1923 high school building was sold and renovated into apartments.

In 2022, the addition of a 500-seat auditorium was built at the high school.

=== Borland Elementary ===
When Borland Elementary opened in 1973, it was designed for an innovative open classroom concept. Open classrooms were a trend in the late 1960s and early 1970s that was intended to give students more freedom of choice in their studies and reduce discipline problems. They had classrooms that were typically open to a central library or gathering area. Borland students were assigned learning projects based on ability rather than age or grade, although the school served students who would generally be in grades four through six. It featured six "teaching stations," each led by three teachers, with each station accommodating 90 students.

A year after opening, when the school board invited parents to a meeting to hear suggestions about improvements for the district, only three showed up. One parent was concerned about Borland Elementary being noisy for students because it didn't have walls between the classrooms. In 1977, students at Borland were interviewed for a newspaper article and described the physical setup as "tiring" and "annoying," although state assessments showed that Borland students performed at average or better in math and reading. Throughout the 1970s and 1980s, Borland become more traditional in terms of space and curriculum, and the building was renovated around 1993.

== Schools ==
Schools in Imlay City Community Schools district
School	Address	Notes
Imlay City High School	1001 Norlin Drive, Imlay City	Grades 9–12. Built 1993.
Imlay City Middle School	495 W. First Street, Imlay City	Grades 6–8. Built 1958.
Borland Elementary	500 W. Borland Road, Imlay City	Grades 3–5. Built 1973.
Weston Elementary	275 Weston St., Imlay City	Grades K–2. Built 1964.
Early Learning Center	275 Weston St., Imlay City	Preschool and child care located within Weston Elementary
Spartan Bridge/Venture High School		Alternative high school, grades 9–12
