= Almont Community Schools =

School district in Michigan

Address
- 3701 Howland Road Almont, Lapeer County, Michigan, 48003; United States

District information
- Grades: Pre-Kindergarten-12
- Superintendent: Kim VonHiltmayer
- Schools: 3
- Budget: $19,174,000 2022-2023 expenditures
- NCES District ID: 2602670

Students and staff
- Students: 1,389 (2024-2025)
- Teachers: 74.67 (on an FTE basis) (2024-2025)
- Staff: 165.52 FTE (2024-2025)
- Student–teacher ratio: 18.6 (2024-2025)

Other information
- Website: www.almontschools.org/home

Almont Community Schools is a public school district in Michigan's Thumb region. In Lapeer County, it serves Almont and parts of the townships of Almont, Dryden, and Imlay. In Oakland County, it serves part of Addison Township. In Macomb County, it serves part of Bruce Township. In St. Clair County, it serves part of Berlin Township.

== History ==
Beginning in 1834, several log cabin schools were established around Almont. By the 1850s, the village itself had three private academies for high school students. In 1867, a publicly-funded union school district was established and a Union School was built to hold all grades, including the high school.

On December 9, 1881, the Union School burned down. Its replacement opened in April 1884. This school lasted about 43 years until it, too, burned down on April 18, 1927.

The school was rebuilt in 1928 at 401 Church Street. It contained new features such as drinking fountains, a gymnasium/auditorium (considered a luxury for a farming village) and a fireplace and goldfish pond in the kindergarten room. As independent one-room schoolhouse districts in outlying areas consolidated with Almont's district, the facility was expanded. Major additions were built in 1955 and 1967.

During the 1960s and 1970s, overcrowding and financial strain beset the district. A new high school was needed, but voters turned down a bond issue to fund it several times. In fall 1977, lack of space in the district led to high school and middle school students sharing the building for half-day sessions. The split sessions continued until fall 1982, when overcrowding lessened due to declining enrollment.

The current high school opened in 1988. Orchard Primary School was built around 2000. As of 2002, it held preschool through second grade, while grades three through six attended Almont Elementary, housed in the 1928 high school building. That year, voters passed a bond issue to build a new middle school, to open in 2004, between the high school and Orchard Primary. The 1928 building became Almont Elementary. Almont Elementary has closed and the building converted to senior housing in 2017.

=== 1927 controversy and fire ===
In spring 1927, the school was in turmoil over controversies and the high school building was destroyed. In March, a girl from the Adrian Training School, part of the juvenile justice system, began attending school in Almont. She had been released on parole and began attending high school in Almont because her family had moved there. Suspicious of the girl, many Almont parents and community members demanded that superintendent Everett Bristol expel her, but he refused because there was no legal reason to. Meanwhile, many in the school community were upset with Duane Black, a new high school teacher who many felt graded too strictly in an effort to raise standards.

Factions developed in the village who were for and against Superintendent Bristol. Meanwhile, the girl was accused by a school board member of violating her parole and returned briefly to the Almont Training School, and upon returning to Almont, was kept out of school by her family at the request of members of the community. The controversy contributed to the decision by the school board to dismiss superintendent Bristol, and instead appointed Mr. Black as superintendent. Bristol's dismissal received a three fifths vote by the school board, with the three members voting in favor of dismissal being members of a church that had protested the enrollment of the girl from Adrian. Over ninety high school students revolted and staged a walk-out parade on April 12, 1927 to protest the dismissal. Carrying banners supporting Mr. Bristol and complaining about Mr. Black, many were joined by their parents. Mr. Black resigned in response.

The next day, Wednesday April 13, the school board met and requested the resignation of the high school principal and all faculty members. A school board member told a reporter for the Flint Journal that the resignations were "so that dissension in the high school would be eliminated." The school reopened the next Monday with a new staff and principal. That night, the school burned down in a suspicious fire.

Flames were seen initially in both the basement and second floor, the scene smelled like kerosene, and an empty can of kerosene was found. The custodian stated he had locked the doors, but the doors were found wide open by the firefighters upon arrival. The school board initially offered a $500 reward for information leading to the conviction of the arsonist, but ultimately decided that the fire was not arson. Investigations by several agencies could did not conclude that the fire was arson, and the state fire marshal theorized that the fire started behind the furnace and rose up the flue to the second floor, despite the furnace being unlit when the firefighters arrived.

== Schools ==
Schools in Almont Community Schools district share a campus north of Almont between Howland Road and Kidder Road. Although the high school and middle school share an address, they are in separate buildings.

Schools in Almont Community Schools district
School	Address	Notes
Almont High School	4701 Howland Road, Almont	Grades 8-12. Built 1988.
Almont Middle School	4701 Howland Road, Almont	Grades 4-7. Built 2004.
Orchard Primary School	4664 Kidder Road, Almont	Grades PreK-3. Built 2000.

== Sources ==
- Almont Community Schools
