= Currier House (Almont, Michigan) =

Historic house in Michigan, United States

- Frederick P. Currier House
- U.S. National Register of Historic Places
- Michigan State Historic Site
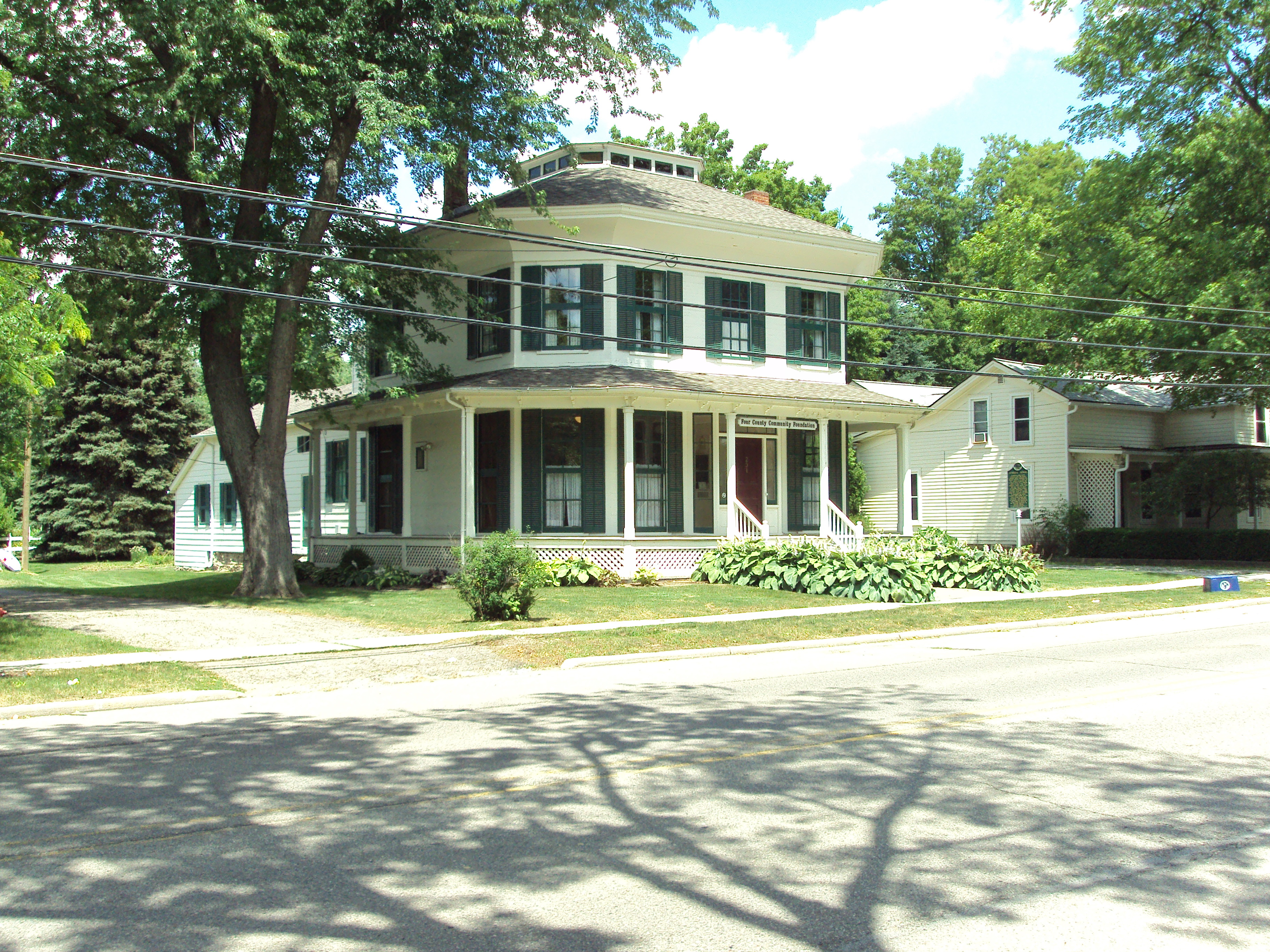

- Location within Michigan Location within the United States
- Interactive map
- Location: 231 East Saint Clair Street; Almont, Michigan
- Coordinates: 42°55′15″N 83°02′31″W
- Built: 1854
- Architectural style: Octagon house
- NRHP reference No.: 75000950

Significant dates
- Added to NRHP: July 10, 1975
- Designated MSHS: April 5, 1975

The Frederick P. Currier House is a private residential structure located at 231 East Saint Clair Street in the village of Almont in Almont Township in southeastern Lapeer County, Michigan. It was designated as a Michigan State Historic Site on April 5, 1975, and soon after added to the National Register of Historic Places on July 10, 1975.

== Description and history ==
Built in 1854, the 2 1/2-story house was designed in the octagon style, which was popular at the time. However, not all eight of the structure's sides are equal length. The front, rear, and side walls are 24 feet (7.3 m) long, and the four diagonal walls are only six feet (1.8 m) in length. The first floor also has a higher ceiling at 11 feet (3.4 m) high and contains a wraparound porch. The house is not a unique structure in itself but remains one of the oldest such structures in the state of Michigan. It was built by carpenter Frederick P. Currey, who was a prominent businessman in several other fields in Lapeer County. His descendants maintained the house until 1961 until selling it to another private owner.

A plaque was dedicated on the site that reads, "Frederick and Mary Currier built this house around 1854, inspired by Orson Fowler's A Home for All, which promoted the octagon form as a healthy place to live. The tall windows, which admit light and air, and the five octagonal rooms reflect Fowler's philosophy. The Curriers came to Almont from New England in 1847. A machinist by trade, Currier (1812–1900) at one time owned farms and factories, and invested in banking and lumbering. The house is listed in the National Register of Historic Places."
