= West Saint Clair Street Historic District =

Historic district in Michigan, United States

- U.S. National Register of Historic Places
- U.S. Historic district
- Michigan State Historic Site
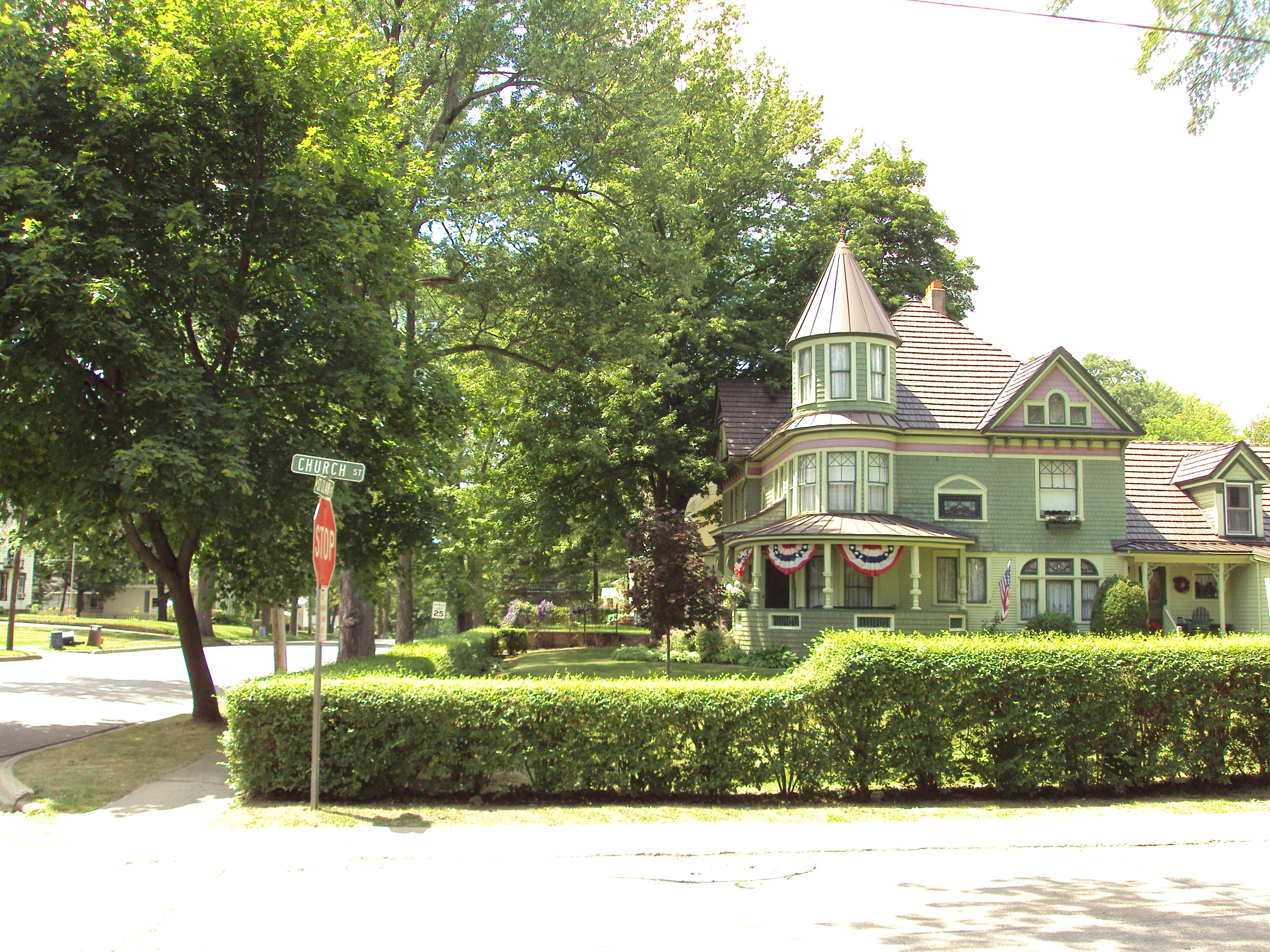

- Location within Michigan Location within the United States
- Interactive map
- Location: 124–328 W. Saint Clair Street; Almont, Michigan
- Coordinates: 42°55′14″N 83°02′52″W
- Area: 16 buildings
- Architectural style: Mix of Colonial Revival, Gothic Revival, Greek Revival, Italianate, Late Victorian, and Queen Anne
- NRHP reference No.: 86000998

Significant dates
- Added to NRHP: May 8, 1986
- Designated MSHS: May 8, 1986

The West Saint Clair Street Historic District is a residential historic district located along 124–328 West Saint Clair Street in the village of Almont in Almont Township in southeast Lapeer County, Michigan. It was designated as a Michigan State Historic Site and also added to the National Register of Historic Places on May 8, 1986.

== History ==
Almont was first settled in 1834, when Daniel Black built a log tavern in this area. By 1838, the settlement had a school, store, blacksmith shop, shoe shop, and grist mill. In 1843, the local logging industry was picking up, and the firm of Beach, Imlay and Morse built a sawmill in Imlay City and a connecting plank road to Mt. Clemens running through Almont. The access to reliable transportation was a boon to the local economy, and a pearlash factory, fulling mill, and foundry opened in the next few years, with a sawmill, fanning mill, and another foundry following close behind.

With the boom in industry, the town prospered, with new commercial buildings being constructed. At the same time, new Greek Revival and Italianate houses were being built for the town'e newly prosperous and prominent citizens; many of those were in the district along West Saint Clair Street. By 1865, Almont had over 800 citizens, and in 1866 a local bank was formed, and a number of factories using the still-abundant local lumber were established in the area. By 1882, the lumber industry was slowing, but the Port Huron and Northwestern Railway built a line through the village, which gave the area easy access to cheap transportation for agricultural goods. Later introduction of the automobile in the twentieth century shifted the output of local factories to make automotive parts.

== Description ==
Located just west of Almont's central business district along M-53, the district consists of 15 residential houses and one library located along a single stretch of West Saint Clair Street that intersects with Church, Cherry, and Day Street—although the district contains no properties along these side streets. The district contains a variety of architectural styles, including Colonial Revival, Gothic Revival, Greek Revival, Italianate, Late Victorian, and Queen Anne. The district also contain the Henry Stephens Memorial Library, which is a contributing property that was listed in its own right as a Michigan State Historic Site on May 16, 1991. Located at 213 West Saint Clair Street, the Colonial Revival structure was funded and built in 1918 by Albert Stephens, who was the son of one of Lapeer County's earliest settlers and lumber pioneers, Henry Stephens.
