= Almont =

Almont may refer to:

== Places ==
=== France ===
- Almont (river)

=== United States ===
- Almont, Colorado
- Almont, Iowa
- Almont, Michigan
- Almont Township, Michigan
- Almont, North Dakota
- Almont, Pennsylvania

== See also ==
- Almonte (disambiguation)
