= Almonte =

Almonte may refer to:

== People ==
- Almonte (surname)

== Places ==
- Almonte, Spain, a town and municipality in Huelva province, Spain
- Almonte, Ontario, a town in Ontario, Canada
- Almonte, California, an unincorporated community in Marin County

== Rivers ==
- Almonte (river), a river in Spain

== See also ==
- Almont (disambiguation)
