= Clara Engle =

American nurse

- Born: May 7, 1913; Freeport, Illinois, U.S.
- Died: December 4, 2003 (age 90); Lapeer, Michigan, U.S.
- Occupations: Nurse, medical missionary

Clara Anna Engle (May 7, 1913 – December 4, 2003) was an American nurse and medical missionary who served in the United States Army Nurse Corps during World War II and worked in Turkey from 1946 to 1966.

== Early life and education ==
Engle was born in Freeport, Illinois, the daughter of Sidney John Engle and Anna Johanna Hillebrecht Engle. She graduated from high school in Imlay City, Michigan, and earned her nursing degree from Butterworth Hospital in 1937. She earned a bachelor's degree in 1953, and a master's degree in nursing in 1958, both from Wayne State University. She was president of the Butterworth Hospital Alumni Association.

== Career ==
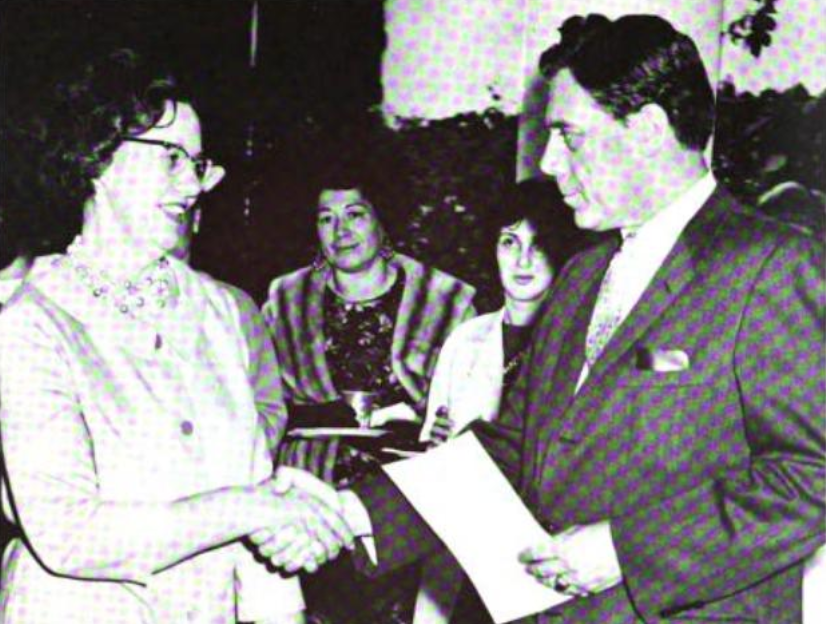
Clara Engle and G. Lewis Schmidt, from a 1966 publication of the United States Department of State

Engle served with the Army Nurse Corps during World War II. She was attached to a hospital ship at Halloran General Hospital in 1944, and rose to the rank of first lieutenant at Stark General Hospital in South Carolina. After the war, Engle went to Turkey as a medical missionary with the American Board of Commissioners for Foreign Missions, working at a hospital in Gaziantep, and at the American University in Beirut, from 1946 to 1956. She spoke about her work to church groups during a furlough in 1952, and after her missionary term ended in 1958. In 1959, she worked at Michigan State University's School of Nursing.

In Turkey again from 1960 to 1966, Engle established clinics for premature infants and heart patients. She began a nurses' aide training program, and a nursing school. She received a citation from the U.S. State Department in 1966, at a ceremony in İzmir. "It is a measure of Miss Engle's success that her efforts have largely broken down many of the prejudicial barriers and persuaded many young women of good families either to enter the nursing profession or to participate in the badly needed nurses aide program in Turkish hospitals," noted consul general G. Lewis Schmidt on the occasion.

Engle worked in various healthcare settings in Michigan after she returned to the United States, including the Caro State Home and Training School, a state institution for people with developmental disabilities.

== Personal life ==
Engle died in 2003, at the age of 90, in Lapeer, Michigan.
