= Charles Palmer House =

- U.S. National Register of Historic Places
- Michigan State Historic Site
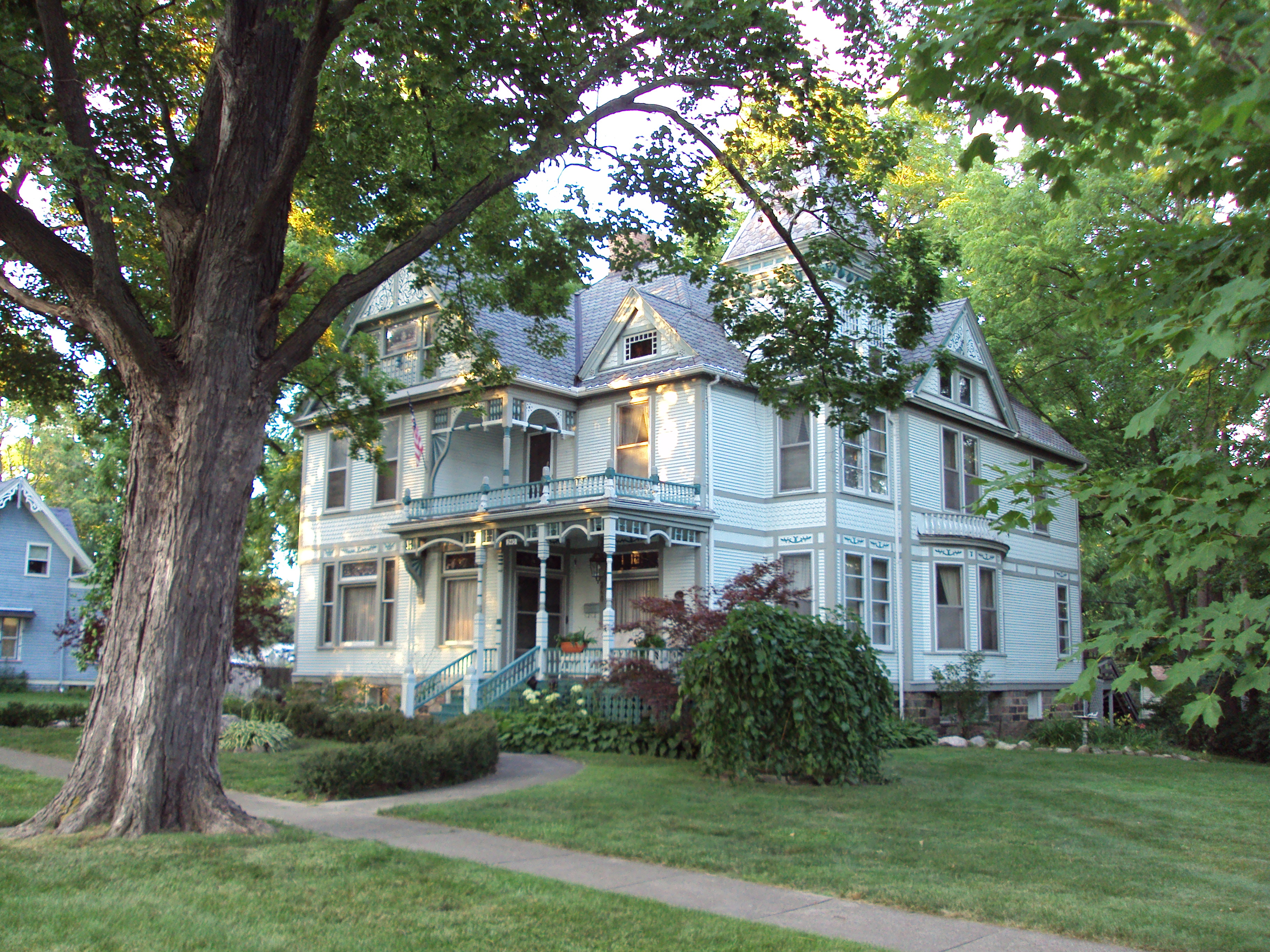

- Location within Michigan Location within the United States
- Interactive map showing the location of Charles Palmer House
- Location: 240 N. Main St., Imlay City, Michigan
- Coordinates: 43°01′34″N 83°04′28″W
- Area: less than one acre
- Built: 1890
- Architectural style: Queen Anne
- NRHP reference No.: 87000916
- Added to NRHP: June 12, 1987

The Charles Palmer House is a single-family home located at 240 North Main Street in Imlay City, Michigan. It was listed on the National Register of Historic Places in 1987.

== History ==
Charles Palmer was born in Saratoga County, New York in 1831. He began working on the railroad as a civil engineer by age 17, and in 1851 was working in Toledo, Ohio. He moved to Wisconsin in 1853, and then to Michigan in 1856, where he was chief engineer and superintendent of construction for the Port Huron and Lake Michigan Railroad. Drawn by the land, he platted out the settlement that was to become Imlay City. In 1870, he started construction of the Bancroft House, a railroad hotel in Imlay City, and over the next few years he opened a bank, worked as a school board member, and served as a village trustee.

Early in the city's history, Palmer constructed a house on this lot. In 1890, Palmer moved the original house backwards on the lot and built this house for his family. Palmer lived in the house until his death in 1916.

== Description ==
The Charles Palmer House is a two-story Queen Anne house framed and sheathed in wood. It is laden with wood detailing, including a variety of window shapes and sizes, a complex roofline of hipped and gabled shapes, and a rich overlay of shingled, carved, incised, turned, and jig-sawed wood ornamentation. The house is asymmetrical, with the front facade continuing a recessed central bay capped with a pediment and flanked by a projecting bay capped by the end of a gabled roof, and a further recessed bay that is actually a three-story tower topped with a hipped roof and finial.

The house is clad with narrow clapboard siding, with a band course of fishscale shingles. Carved floral swags are over the first floor windows, and there are turned details on the first and second story porches. The tower has squared shingles and cornice line brackets at the top floor level.
