= Marshall Sylver =

American performance hypnotist

Marshall Sylwestrzak
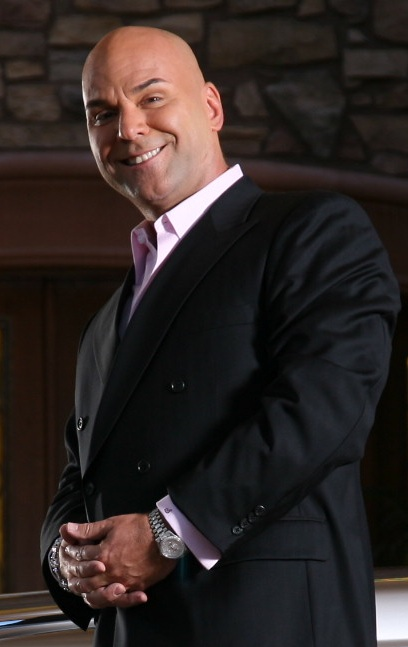
- Born: Marshall Walter Sylwestrzak; May 19, 1962 (age 64)
- Occupations: Motivational Speaker, Author, Hypnotist, Entertainer
- Spouse: Erica Sylver (2014– )
- Children: 3

Marshall Walter Sylwestrzak, professionally known as Marshall Sylver, is an American motivational speaker, author, and stage hypnotist. Known for his work in Las Vegas, Nevada, he has marketed himself as "The World's Fastest Hypnotist".

Over the course of his career, Sylver has performed in prominent Las Vegas venues and made numerous television appearances. He is also the author of Passion, Profit & Power and has hosted his own radio program.

== Early life ==
Marshall Sylwestrzak is the seventh of 10 children born to Virginia "Babe" Sylwestrzak, and spent most of his childhood in Almont, Michigan. While Marshall was growing up, Sylver’s mom worked various jobs, including owning "a little truck stop/airport restaurant business." Later, she worked for a local Office of Economic Opportunity as supervisor of three counties.

Sylver became interested in magic at the age of seven. "Even though I was only seven at the time, it was obvious to me what my brother was doing. But when I impressed my Dad when I did the tricks myself, it was such an incredible feeling....And I was hooked," he said.

In 1976, his family moved to San Diego, where he attended Kearny High School. After moving to San Diego, Sylver worked in retail and later as a gas station attendant while in school. It’s in that job that Sylver met the program director for 104 KJOY-FM radio in San Diego, who offered him an internship. One evening at the station, Sylver was given the opportunity to DJ when one of the on-air personalities called in. He was later hired as a regular DJ.

== Career ==
Sylver began his professional career as a magician, performing at radio stations, rock clubs, and cruise ships. He transitioned into hypnotism in 1985. That same year, he made his national television debut as a hypnotist on Late Night with David Letterman, returning again in 1986. By 1987, Sylver was headlining his own stage shows, including the Sylver Hypnotic Revue.

In 2003, Sylver faced legal challenges when he was tried in Nevada for fraud related to a mentorship program. He was accused of failing to provide refunds to dissatisfied customers. The case ended in a mistrial.

=== Hypnosis Show ===
Sylver had a hypnosis show at Harrah's in Las Vegas in 2007 and at the Palms in 2003.

He also had shows at the Sahara Hotel and the Stratosphere in the mid-1990s.

=== Television ===
Sylver has appeared on Late Night with David Letterman and The Montel Williams Show.

He had an infomercial, Passion Profit & Power, that ran in the mid-1990s.

In the first episode of the third series of Louis Theroux's Weird Weekends, Sylver's seminars were featured, where the power of persuasion was purportedly used to motivate attendees to become self-made millionaires.

=== Seminars ===
Sylver is a motivational speaker and business consultant. He was a speaker at the Learning Annex "Wealth Expo" along with Tony Robbins in 2006 as well as the First Annual Entrepreneur Success Summit in 2010. He also hosts the "Turning Point Seminar."

In April 2003, Sylver was indicted for theft after nine of his self-improvement program's 1,200 clients alleged that he had failed to honor a money-back guarantee. Five had already received their refunds in small claims court. In December, after three weeks of proceedings, the case ended in a mistrial.

=== Books and CDs ===
Sylver wrote a book titled Passion, Profit & Power, which was published by Simon & Schuster in 1997, along with audio cassettes by the same name, as part of a subconscious training system. Passion, Profit & Power was a bestseller from Berita Book Centre and MPH Bookstores for the week of July 19, 1997.

=== Radio and Movies ===
Sylver hosts a radio show titled "Get Rich Radio." He starred in the 2010 movie Tranced, which was the first movie intended to hypnotize the audience.

== Book ==
- Passion Profit Power. Marshall Sylver. Simon & Schuster (January 21, 1997)
