= Attica Township, Michigan =

- Civil township
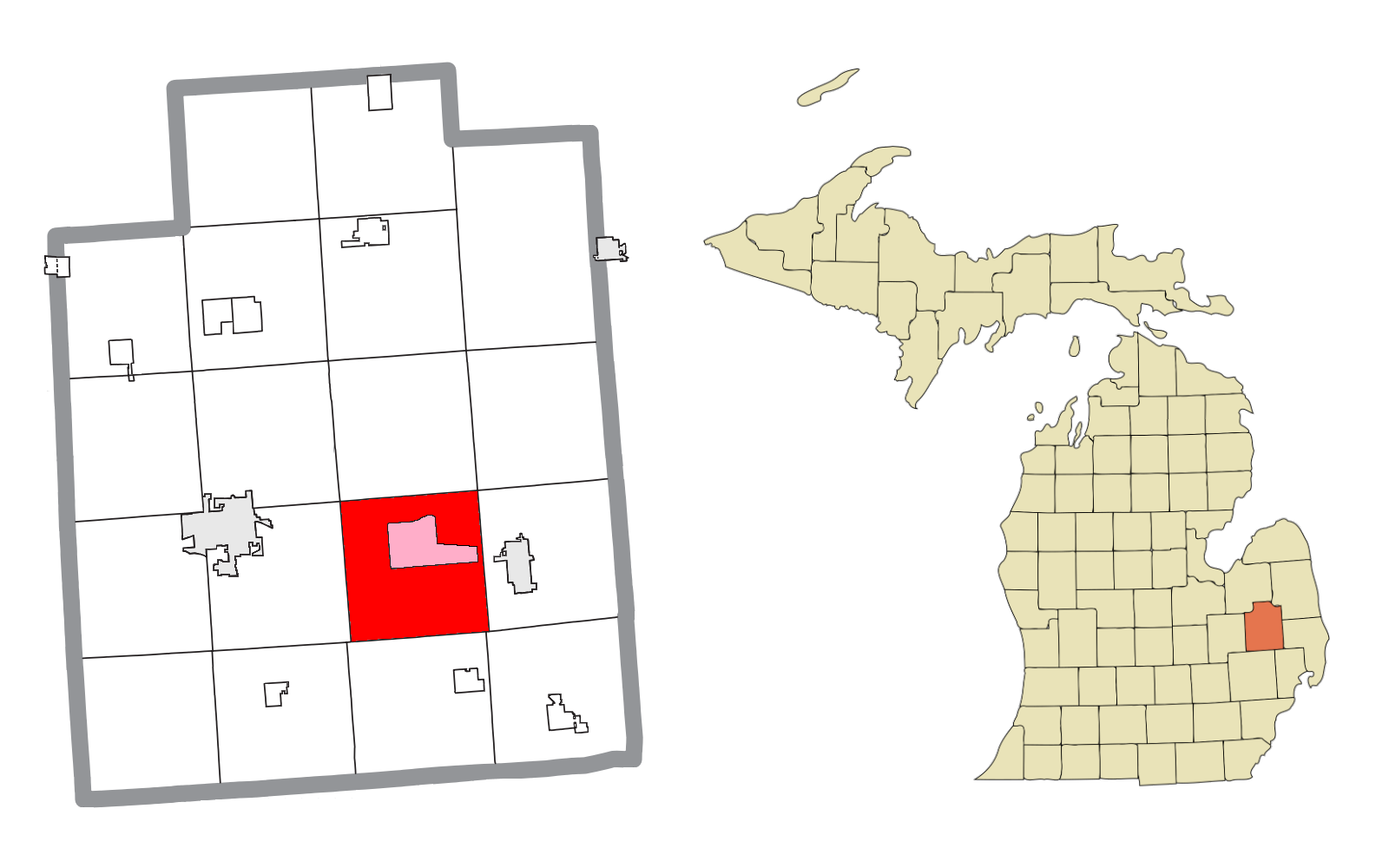
- Location within Lapeer County (red) and the administered CDP of Attica (pink)

- Location within the state of Michigan Location within the United States
- Coordinates: 43°00′54″N 83°09′36″W
- Country: United States
- State: Michigan
- County: Lapeer

Government
  - Supervisor: Al Ochadleus
  - Clerk: Nancy Herpolsheimer
  - Treasurer: Pam Mason

Area
  - Total: 36.3 sq mi (93.9 km^{2})
  - Land: 35.8 sq mi (92.6 km^{2})
  - Water: 0.46 sq mi (1.2 km^{2})
- Elevation: 879 ft (268 m)

Population (2020)
  - Total: 4,706
  - Density: 132/sq mi (50.8/km^{2})
- Time zone: UTC-5 (Eastern (EST))
  - Summer (DST): UTC-4 (EDT)
- ZIP code: 48412 (Attica), 48428 (Dryden), 48444 (Imlay City), 48455 (Metamora)
- Area code: 810
- FIPS code: 26-04040
- GNIS feature ID: 1625858
- Website: atticatownship.org

Attica Township is a civil township of Lapeer County in the U.S. state of Michigan. The population was 4,706 at the 2020 Census.

== Communities ==
- Attica is an unincorporated community north of the center of the township at 43°01′49″N 83°09′58″W In 1851, William Williams from New York state built a sawmill here, and most of the settlement developed on his land. I. N. Jenness, a lumberman and also from New York, is considered as co-founder of the community. A post office named "Mill Station" was established on October 9, 1867, with Oscar A. Williams as the first postmaster. The office was renamed "Elk Lake" on September 12, 1870, and became "Attica", after the township, on February 1, 1871. The Attica post office, with ZIP code 48412, serves most of northern and western Attica Township, as well as much of Arcadia Township to the north.
- The village of Dryden is to the south in Dryden Township, and the Dryden post office, with ZIP code 48428, also serves small portions of southern Attica Township.
- The city of Imlay City is to the east in Imlay Township, and the Imlay post office, with ZIP code 48444, also serves portions of eastern Attica Township.
- The village of Metamora is to the southwest in Metamora Township, and the Metamora post office, with ZIP code 48455, also serves portions of southwest Attica Township.

== Geography ==
According to the United States Census Bureau, the township has a total area of 36.2 square miles (94 km^{2}), of which 35.8 square miles (93 km^{2}) is land and 0.5 square miles (1.3 km^{2}) (1.32%) is water. It is located at latitude 43°1'49" North, longitude 83°9'58" West.

== Demographics ==
As of the census of 2000, there were 4,678 people, 1,602 households, and 1,291 families residing in the township. The population density was 130.8 inhabitants per square mile (50.5/km^{2}). There were 1,789 housing units at an average density of 50.0 per square mile (19.3/km^{2}). The racial makeup of the township was 96.86% White, 0.13% African American, 0.58% Native American, 0.43% Asian, 0.02% Pacific Islander, 1.18% from other races, and 0.81% from two or more races. Hispanic or Latino people of any race were 2.65% of the population.

There were 1,602 households, out of which 38.5% had children under the age of 18 living with them, 69.5% were married couples living together, 6.3% had a female householder with no husband present, and 19.4% were non-families. 15.4% of all households were made up of individuals, and 5.0% had someone living alone who was 65 years of age or older. The average household size was 2.89 and the average family size was 3.21.

In the township the population was spread out, with 29.1% under the age of 18, 6.3% from 18 to 24, 31.7% from 25 to 44, 23.8% from 45 to 64, and 9.1% who were 65 years of age or older. The median age was 36 years. For every 100 females, there were 101.5 males. For every 100 females age 18 and over, there were 101.5 males.

The median income for a household in the township was $50,392, and the median income for a family was $56,463. Males had a median income of $53,438 versus $25,594 for females. The per capita income for the township was $22,226. About 1.7% of families and 3.6% of the population were below the poverty line, including 3.1% of those under age 18 and 3.6% of those age 65 or over.

== Government ==
Attica is locally governed by a five-member township board, consisting of a supervisor, a clerk, a treasurer, and two trustees. All five members serve four-year terms. The township also has a planning commission and a zoning board of appeals, both appointed by the elected township board. Attica belongs to the 6th county commission district for Lapeer County, the 82nd district for the Michigan State House of Representatives, and the 10th district of Michigan for the United States House of Representatives.
