= Robert M. Shoemaker =

United States general

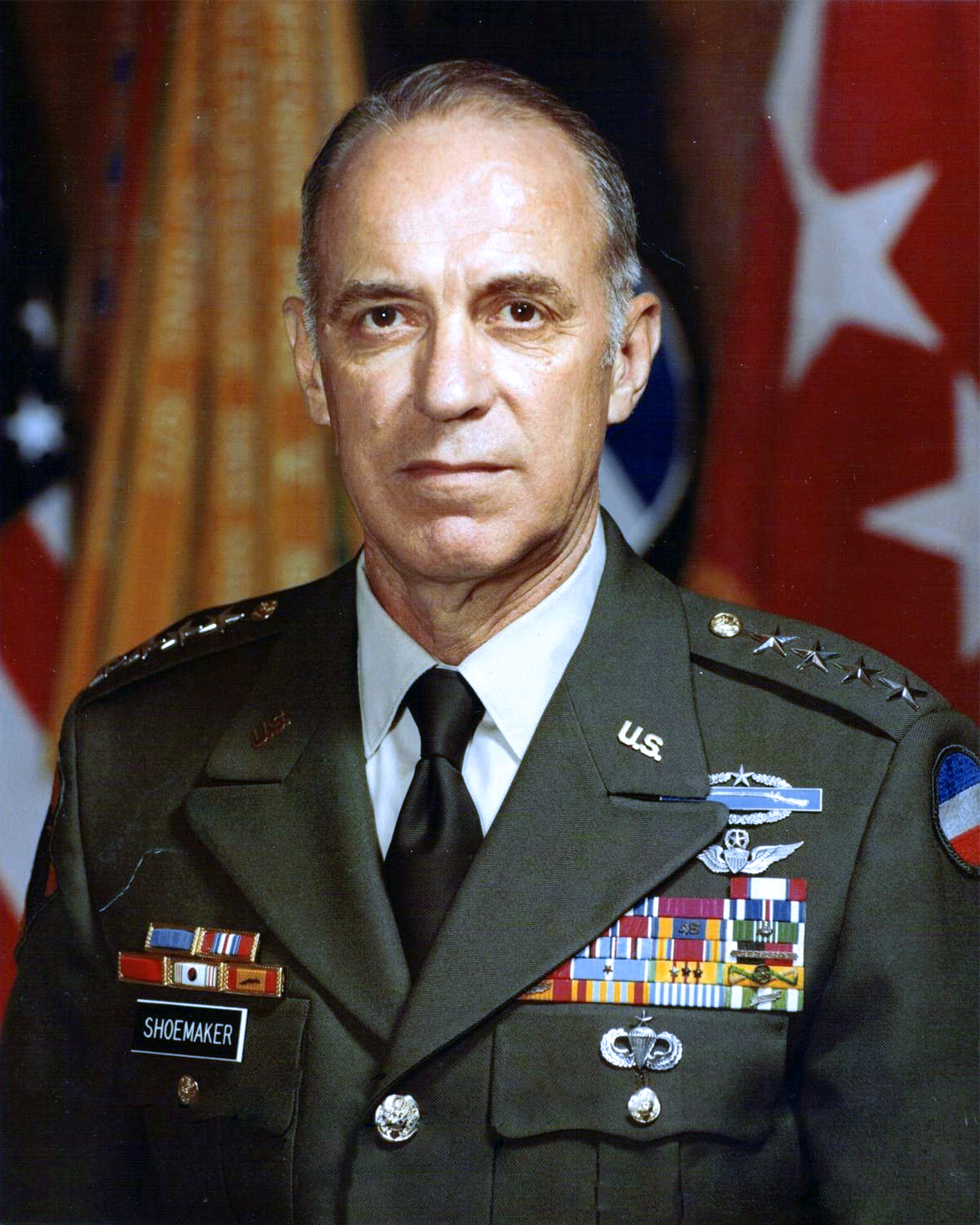
- Born: 18 February 1924; Almont, Michigan
- Died: 21 June 2017 (aged 93); Harker Heights, Texas
- Military career
- Allegiance: United States
- Branch: United States Army
- Service years: 1946–1982
- Rank: General
- Commands: United States Army Forces Command; III Corps; 1st Cavalry Division; 1st Squadron, 9th Cavalry Regiment; 1st Battalion, 12th Cavalry Regiment
- Conflicts: Korean War; Vietnam War
- Awards: Army Distinguished Service Medal; Silver Star; Legion of Merit; Distinguished Flying Cross; Bronze Star Medal
- Other work: Commissioner, Bell County, Texas

Robert Morin Shoemaker (18 February 1924 – 21 June 2017) was a United States Army general and former commander of the United States Army Forces Command. He is also an inductee into the Aviation Hall of Fame.

== Early life and military career ==
Shoemaker was born on 18 February 1924, in Almont, Michigan. He graduated from the United States Military Academy in 1946, and was commissioned in the infantry. Prior to that, he had enlisted in the United States Navy as an officer candidate. However, before he graduated and entered active duty in the navy, he joined the army. He served in various assignment in the 1st Infantry Division, the 82nd Airborne Division and the 2nd Infantry Division. He subsequently became the Infantry Branch assignments officer, and later was an advisor to the Iranian military.

In 1960 Shoemaker earned his aviator's wings, and remained a member of the faculty at the Aviation School. In 1962, he served on the Tactical Mobility Requirements Board, also known as the Howze Board, which developed many of the principles used in air assault operations. He was then sent to Vietnam to assess the potential of army aviation. He was assigned to the experimental 11th Air Assault Division at Fort Benning as division G-3. The division's personnel and equipment were transferred to the newly raised 1st Cavalry Division (Airmobile). In July 1965 he was given command of 1st Battalion, 12th Cavalry Regiment. In December 1965, he assumed command of 1st Squadron, 9th Cavalry Regiment, which was the only air cavalry squadron in the Army at the time.

Shoemaker returned to the United States and, following a tour at the Pentagon, he returned for his third tour of duty in Vietnam as Chief of Staff for the 1st Cavalry Division. In 1969 he became Assistant Division Commander of the 1st Cavalry Division. Shoemaker then served as Commander, 1st Cavalry Division and Commander, III Corps. In 1977, Shoemaker was assigned as Deputy Commander, United States Army Forces Command (FORSCOM), and a year later was promoted to general and became commander of FORSCOM.

== Awards and decorations ==
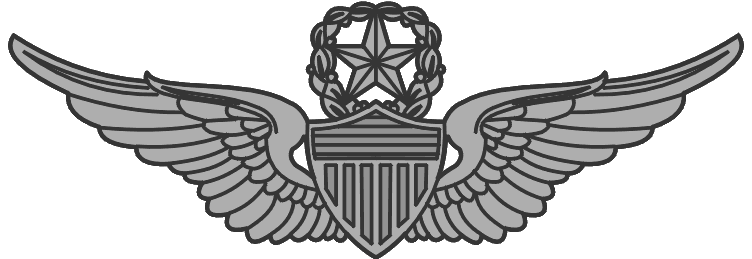
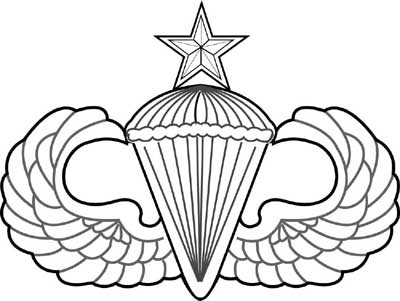
Combat Infantryman Badge (2nd award)
Army Master Aviator Badge
Senior Parachutist Badge

Army Distinguished Service Medal
Silver Star
Legion of Merit
Distinguished Flying Cross
Bronze Star Medal
Air Medal with bronze award numerals 45
Army Commendation Medal with oak leaf cluster
Army Presidential Unit Citation
Valorous Unit Award
Army Meritorious Unit Commendation
American Campaign Medal
World War II Victory Medal
Army of Occupation Medal
National Defense Service Medal with oak leaf cluster
Korean Service Medal with one bronze service star
Vietnam Service Medal with seven service stars
Vietnam Army Distinguished Service Order, 1st class
Vietnam Gallantry Cross with palm
Vietnam Armed Forces Honor Medal, 1st class
Korean Presidential Unit Citation
Vietnam Gallantry Cross Unit Citation
United Nations Korea Medal
Vietnam Campaign Medal

== Later life ==
Shoemaker retired from the army in 1982 to the Fort Hood area, and remained active in community service. He served eight years as the elected Bell County Commissioner. He also backed a campaign that resulted in the establishment of Texas A&M University–Central Texas near Fort Hood. Some of his other civic activities include President and advisor to the President of the 1st Cavalry Division Association, President of the Heart of Texas Council of the Boy Scouts, and as President of the Fort Hood Chapter of the United Way.

Shoemaker was inducted in the United States Army Operational Testers' Hall of Fame in 2002, and in 2004, he was awarded the Distinguished Graduate Award by the Association of Graduates, the United States Military Academy alumni association. He was also inducted as a member of the Army Aviation Hall of Fame in 1983.

Shoemaker died on 21 June 2017, at a hospital in Harker Heights, Texas, at the age of 93. He established the high school, named after him, in Killeen, Texas.
