= John Philip Wernette =

American academic

John "Philip" Wernette (October 29, 1903 – August 12, 1988) was the eighth president of the University of New Mexico serving from 1945 to 1948.

== Early life ==
Wernette was born in Imlay City, Michigan to parents Jacob Israel and Bessie (Barris) Wernette and grew up in Grand Rapids. His family moved to California in 1917 while he was still in high school.

He began attending college at UCLA in 1919 where he was a member of Sigma Pi fraternity. He transferred to the University of California, Berkeley where he earned his A.B. degree in 1924. He earned an A.M. degree at the University of Southern California in 1926. He earned a second master's degree in 1929 and his Ph.D. degree in 1932, both from Harvard University.

== Harvard University ==
While earning his master's degree, Wernette became an associate professor at the Harvard School of Business Administration in 1927. He spent seventeen years as a teacher there. While on the faculty, he was a financial consultant to the governments of Peru and Colombia. He was also a fellow of the Social Science Research Council where he studied the English banking system. During World War II he served as War Price Coordinator in the Office of Price Administration. He was also a member of the Inter-Departmental Procurement Policy Board.

== University of New Mexico ==
Upon arriving in Albuquerque, Wernette focused on improving the university's faculty, programs, and services. He instituted an eighteen-point program of procedures for the selection of new faculty and appointed a committee to ensure better teaching candidates for faculty members. He also developed a program for faculty advancement.

He established the offices of the General Placement Bureau, Veterans Assistance, and Testing and Counseling Services to assist students. He required all seniors in 1946 to take the Graduate Record Examinations test to provide the school with a measurement of how well it was educating its students.

While he was president, the university started the Law School and the School of Business Administration. The university's enrollment grew from 924 to 4,491 students with the end of World War II.

In 1947, he came into conflict with the Board of Regents over the hiring of two faculty members who he thought were unqualified. His contract was not renewed by the Board of Regents in 1948.

== University of Michigan ==
After being dismissed from the University of New Mexico, Wernette found a job at the University of Michigan in 1948 as the Director of the Bureau of Business Research and Professor of Business Administration. He taught classes in business and government and was the founder and editor of the Michigan Business Review.

From the early 1950s to the early 1980s he traveled and gave many speeches to business groups and the University of Michigan's Executive Development Program.

== Published books ==
- Money, Business and Prices (1933)
- Problems in Economic Theory (1939)
- The Control of Business Cycles (1940)
- Problems in Merchandise Distribution (1942)
- Financing Full Employment (1945)

== Personal life ==
He married Eleanor DeCourcy on August 17, 1940 in Manchester, NH. They had two children, John D. and Elizabeth Eleanor. He was a member of the Masons and the Rotary International. He served on the board of directors of the Ohio Citizens Trust Company of Toledo, OH.
