= Eastern Michigan State Fair =

Annual Agricultural Fair

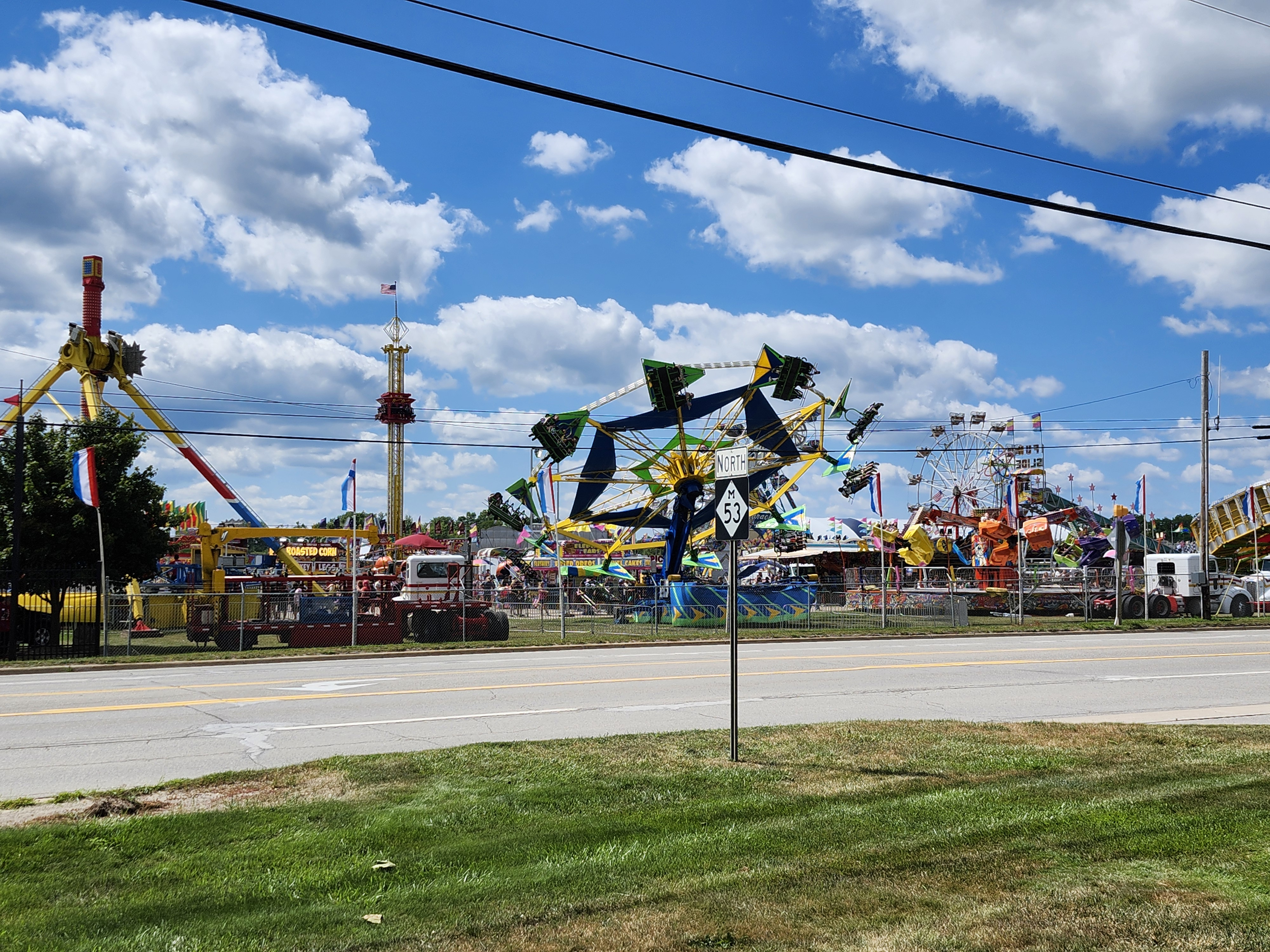
- Frequency: Annually
- Venue: Eastern Michigan State Fairgrounds
- Locations: Imlay City, Michigan
- Coordinates: 43.016, -83.074
- Years active: 129 Years
- Inaugurated: October 7th - 9th, 1896
- Most recent: July 28th - August 1st, 2026

The Eastern Michigan State Fair is an annual fair featuring rides, livestock shows, and grandstand events. The fair is held on the Eastern Michigan State Fairgrounds in Imlay City, Michigan. It has been running there every year since 1896, with the exception of 1944, 1945, and 2020. The fair usually occurs in late July or early August for 5 days.

== History ==
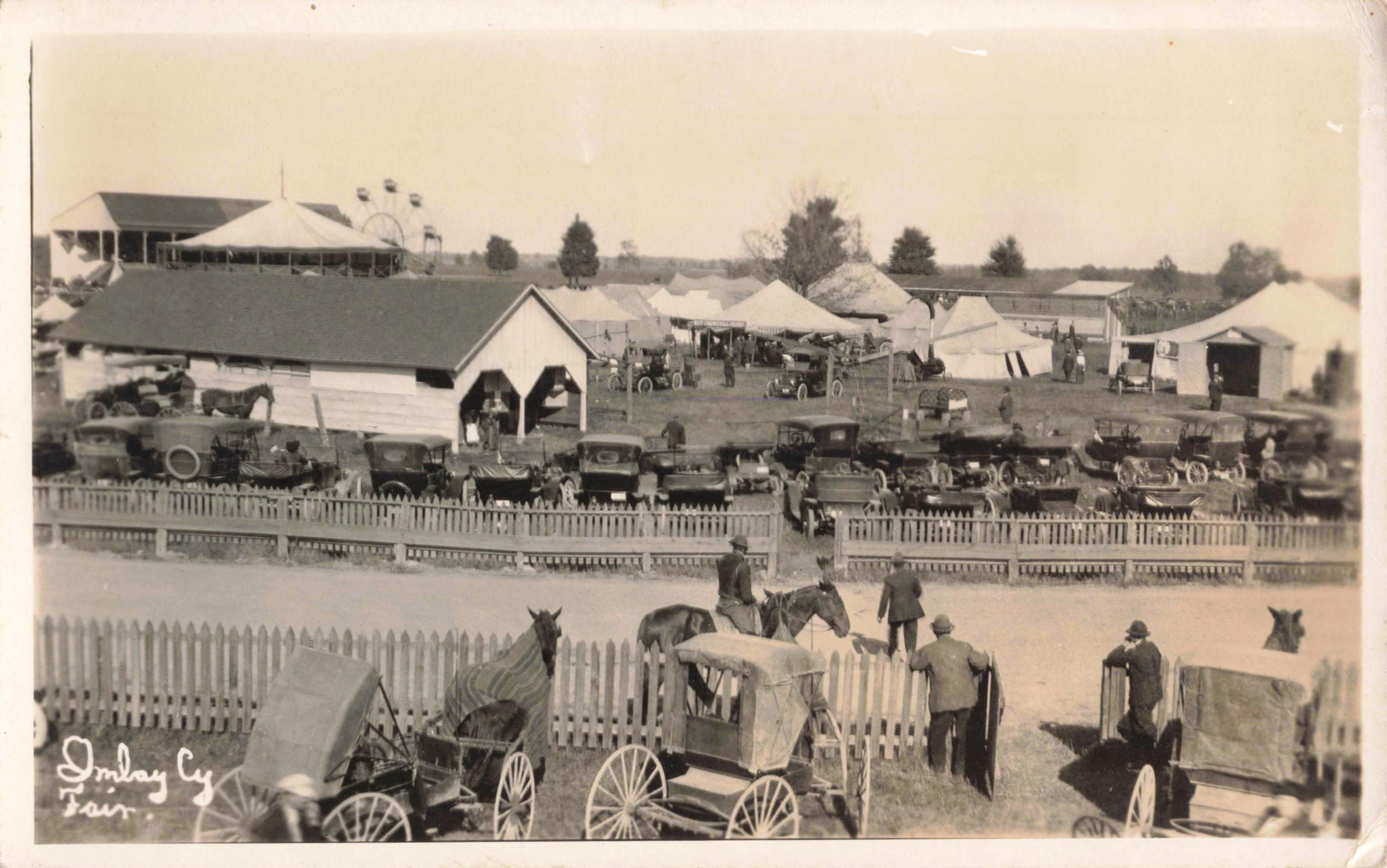
A Buggy Race occurring during the Eastern Michigan State Fair somewhere in the 1900s, when it was named the "Imlay City Fair".

The Imlay City Driving Club, formed in 1883, would create a track that same year, in the location where today's fairground sits. This track was to be used for harness racing, a type of racing popular for fairs at the time. In 1884, the Imlay City Agricultural Society was established, who one year later, would buy the southern half of the modern day fairgrounds for $1,000. Between October 7th-9th of 1896, the Imlay City Agricultural Society hosted the inaugural fair. From 1919-1921, the fair saw a boost in visitors due an interurban trolley line from Detroit, funded by the Royal Oak Booster Club. Every day, 3-4 trolleys would arrive, each holding about 50 people. During the aforementioned time period, the Midway was located in the middle of a race track. The fair included stables that held horse, pigs, cattle, and sheep, a tradition still seen at the fair today. The fair also had a large amount of attractions that no longer appear at the fair, such as a dance hall, duck pond, and baseball field. In 1933, the Lapeer County Agricultural Society was granted a charter by the state to rename as the Lapeer County Fair. From 1948, to 1955, harness racing would not make an appearance at the fair, returning the next year, and running from there until at least 1973. In 1951, the State Fair Board renamed the Lapeer County Fair to the Eastern Michigan Fair. The fair saw its final renaming in 2012, when the name was changed to the Eastern Michigan State Fair. In 2020, the fair was canceled due to the Covid-19 pandemic, the first closure since the fair's inception in 1896. The next year, in 2021, the fair saw 50,319 paid attendees. This showed a record attendance, a 32% increase from 2019. The fair continues to be held every year in summer.

== Fair Entertainment ==
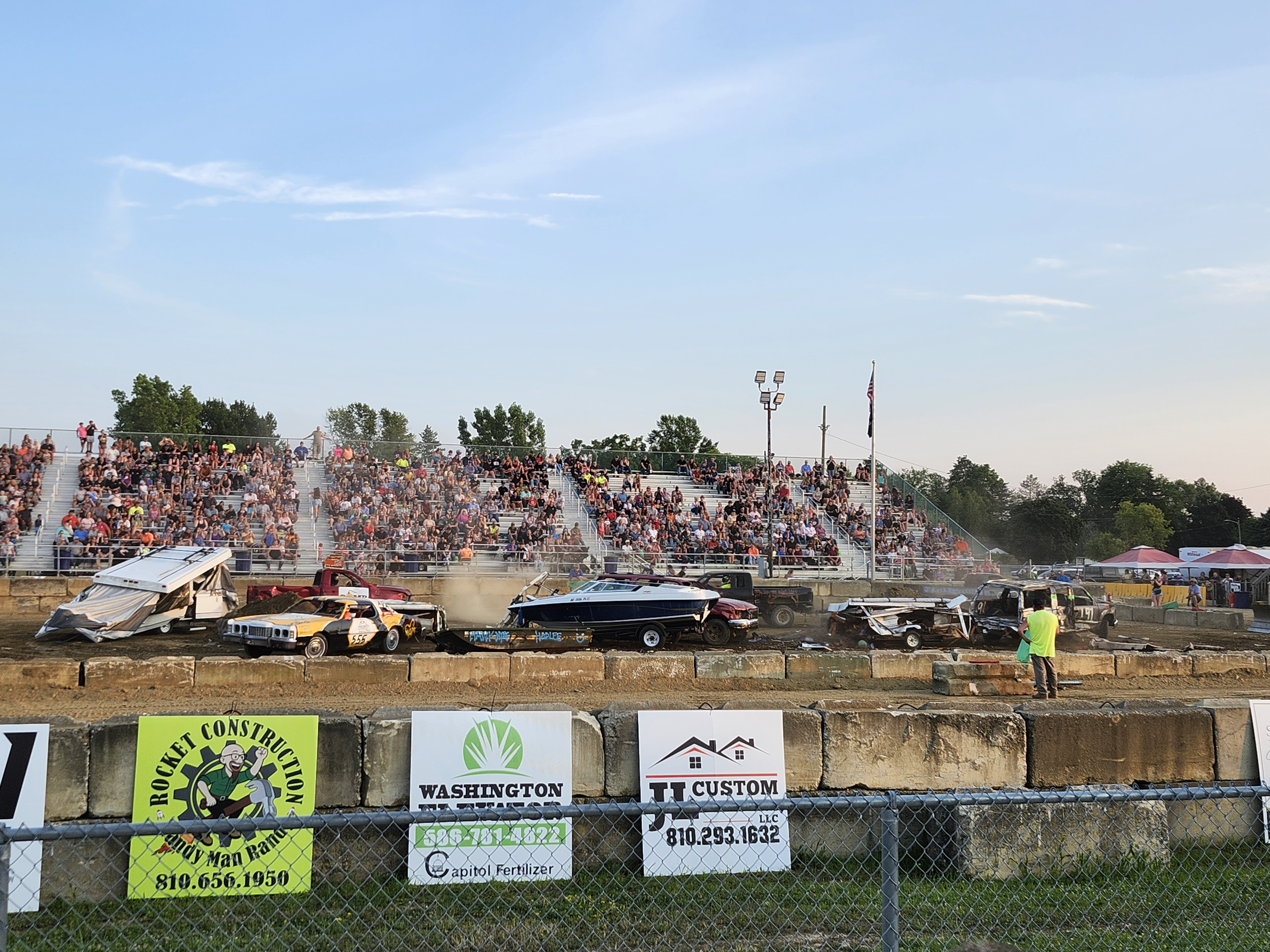
Figure 8 trailer racing at the 2026 Eastern Michigan State Fair

The Eastern Michigan State Fair hosts 5 major events on each of the 5 days it runs. Grandstand events that occur are the demolition derby, the autocross, which is named the Bump-N-Run, monster truck shows, the rodeo, trailer races, and tractor pulls. The fair's midway often contains Ferris Wheels, and other popular carnival rides and games, such as bumper cars and carousels. There are other attractions such as dog shows and a beer tent. In the northern section of the fair is where the animal stables are found, which host animal shows during the fair.

== Other Events ==
The fairgrounds the Eastern Michigan State Fair uses, also accommodates several other local events, such as a shorter, and much smaller fair, named the Vlasic Community Appreciation Fest. This is hosted by Vlasic Pickles, who runs their factory in Imlay City. The fairgrounds also hosts the outdoor expo named Woods-N-Water, which has been running there since 1987.

== See also ==
- Michigan State Fair
- Upper Peninsula State Fair
