= Almonte (surname) =

Almonte is a surname. Notable people with the surname include:

- Abraham Almonte (born 1989), Major League Baseball player
- Carlos Eduardo Almonte, arrested in 2010 on terrorism-related charges
- Danny Almonte (born 1987), former little league baseball player in the United States
- Edwin Almonte (born 1976), baseball player in the United States
- Erick Almonte (born 1978), minor league baseball player in the United States
- Gloria Almonte (born 1983), American beauty queen from the Bronx, New York
- Héctor Almonte (born 1975), baseball player in the United States
- Jose T. Almonte (born 1931), Filipino general
- Juan Almonte (1803–1869), Mexican official and diplomat
- Yency Almonte (born 1994), American baseball player
- Zoilo Almonte (born 1989), Major League Baseball player
