= Almont, Michigan =

- Village
- Village of Almont
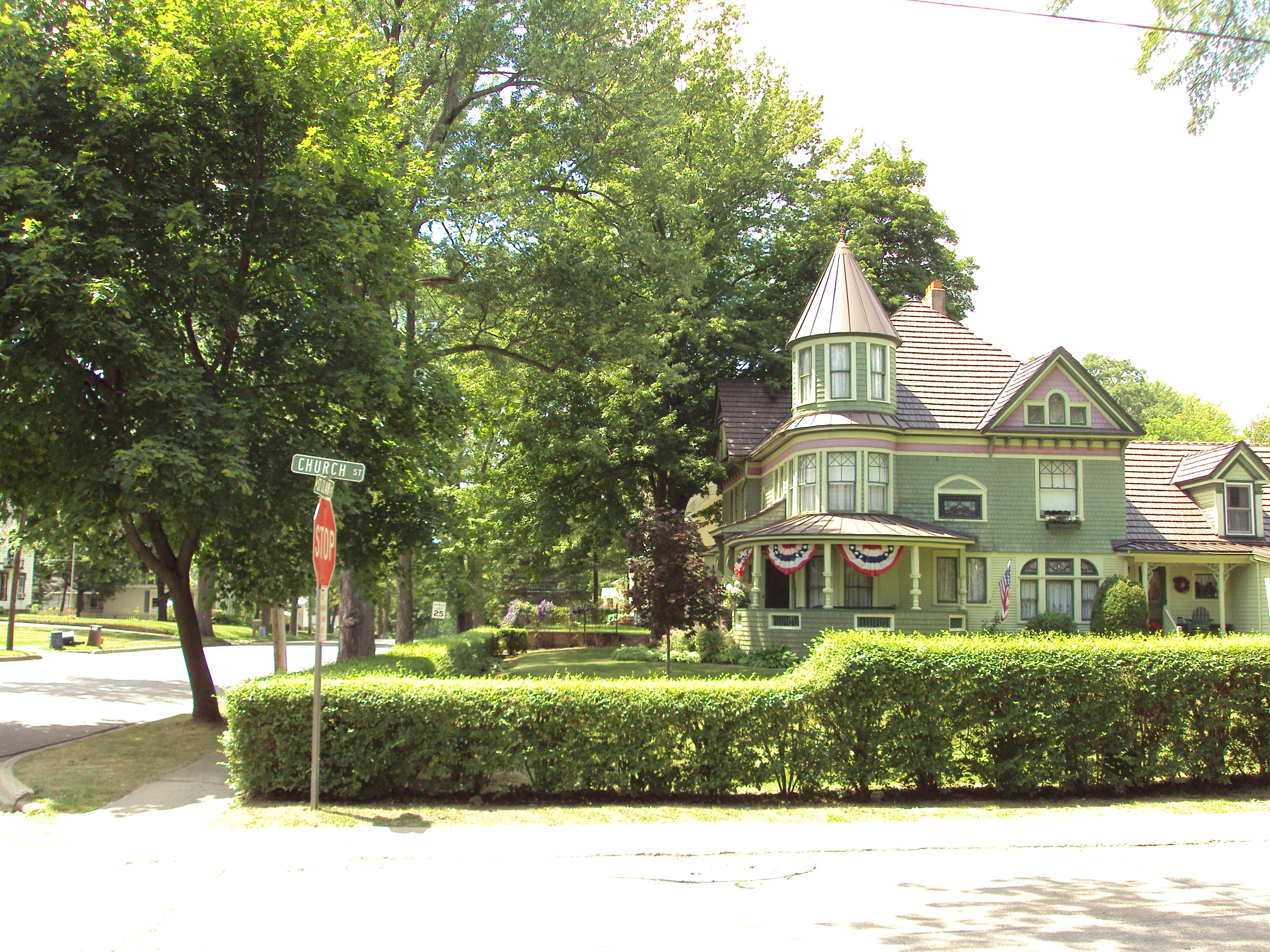
- West Saint Clair Street Historic District

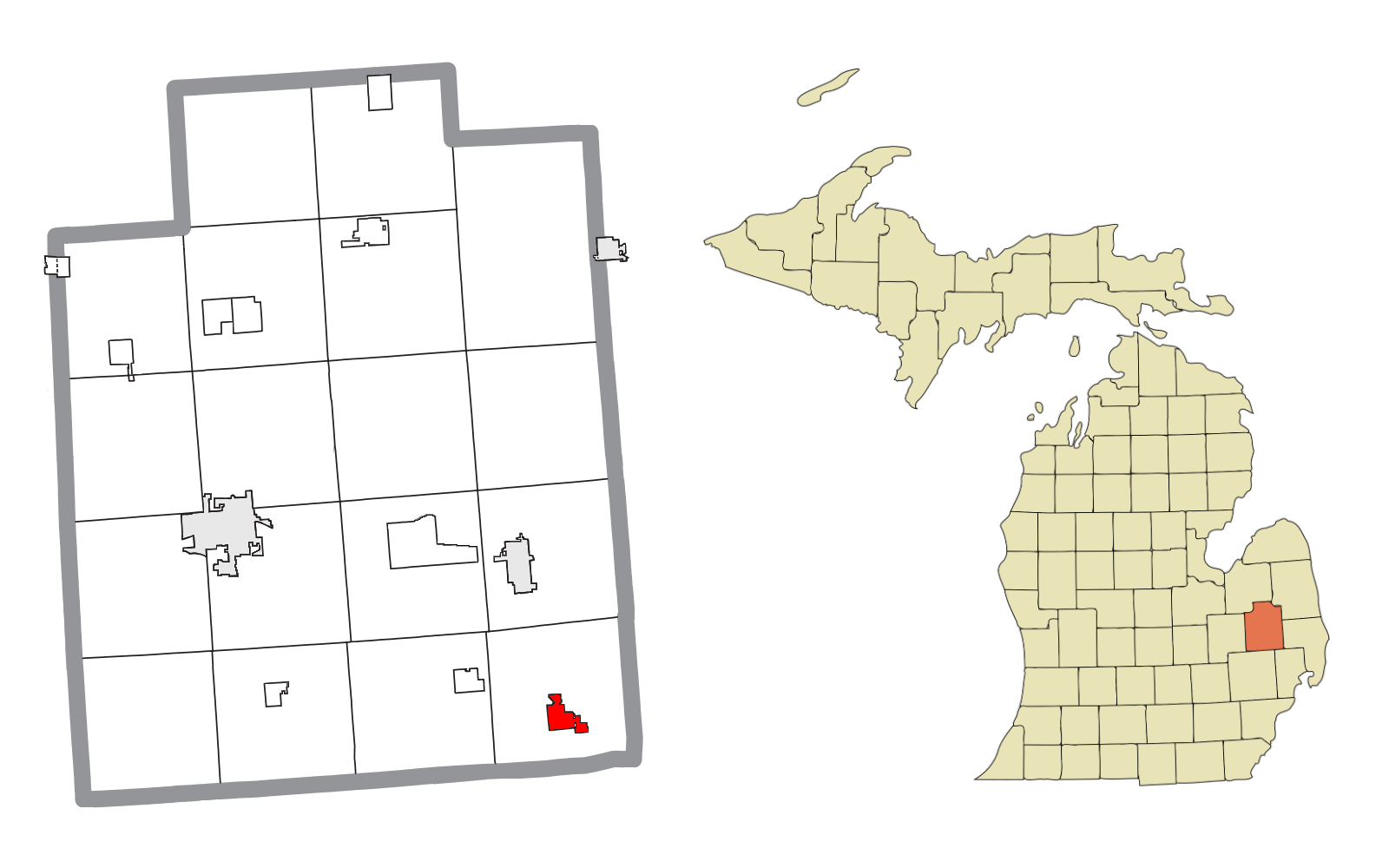
- Location within Lapeer County

- Location within the state of Michigan Location within the United States
- Coordinates: 42°55′14″N 83°02′34″W
- Country: United States
- State: Michigan
- County: Lapeer
- Township: Almont
- Settled: 1828
- Incorporated: 1855

Government
  - Type: Village council
  - President: Steve Schneider
  - Clerk: Kimberly Keesler
  - Manager: David Trent

Area
  - Total: 1.34 sq mi (3.48 km^{2})
  - Land: 1.34 sq mi (3.48 km^{2})
  - Water: 0 sq mi (0.00 km^{2})
- Elevation: 850 ft (259 m)

Population (2020)
  - Total: 2,846
  - Density: 2,123.88/sq mi (820.03/km^{2})
- Time zone: UTC-5 (Eastern (EST))
  - Summer (DST): UTC-4 (EDT)
- ZIP code(s): 48003
- Area code: 810
- FIPS code: 26-01660
- GNIS feature ID: 2397941
- Website: Official website

Almont is a village in Almont Township, Lapeer County, Michigan. Its population was 2,846 at the 2020 census.

== History ==
Almont was first settled in 1828 by James Deneen. It received a post office in 1835 named Bristol, for Oliver Bristol, the second permanent settler. The village was platted as Newburg in 1836, and renamed Almont in 1846.

=== The naming of Almont ===
According to HildaMae Bowman's "Almont, The Tale of Then and Now," Almont's name was changed in 1845 to honor the Mexican general, Juan Almonte.

== Government ==
Almont is a home rule village with a manager-council form of government. Per its charter the village charter provides for seven councilors elected. Four councilors are up for election every two years, with the top three vote-getters serve three terms while the fourth highest serves two year terms. The president and president pro tempore are selected from its members by the council. A village manager is appointed by the council.

The village is served by specialized governmental units, the Almont Community Schools and the Almont District Library.

== Geography ==
According to the United States Census Bureau, the village has a total area of 1.42 square miles (3.68 km^{2}), all land. The village center of Almont is located at the intersection of M-53 (also known as Van Dyke) and St. Clair Street. To the east, St. Clair is known as Almont Road, and to the west it is known as General Squire Road. In addition, this is also sometimes deemed as "40 Mile Road", although the nearby ascending "mile roads" officially end at "37 Mile Road". Nearby towns include Bruce Township and Romeo to the south; Dryden to the northwest; Imlay City to the north; and Allenton to the east, and Capac to the northeast. Almont is approximately 40 miles (64 km) north of Detroit.

== Demographics ==
Historical population
Census	Pop.	Note	%±
1880	837		—
1890	717		−14.3%
1900	718		0.1%
1910	675		−6.0%
1920	789		16.9%
1930	844		7.0%
1940	924		9.5%
1950	1,035		12.0%
1960	1,279		23.6%
1970	1,634		27.8%
1980	1,857		13.6%
1990	2,354		26.8%
2000	2,803		19.1%
2010	2,674		−4.6%
2020	2,846		6.4%
U.S. Decennial Census

=== 2020 census ===
As of the 2020 census, Almont had a population of 2,846. The median age was 38.5 years. 22.0% of residents were under the age of 18 and 16.6% of residents were 65 years of age or older. For every 100 females there were 100.3 males, and for every 100 females age 18 and over there were 96.4 males age 18 and over.

0.0% of residents lived in urban areas, while 100.0% lived in rural areas.

There were 1,131 households in Almont, of which 32.6% had children under the age of 18 living in them. Of all households, 50.8% were married-couple households, 17.4% were households with a male householder and no spouse or partner present, and 25.5% were households with a female householder and no spouse or partner present. About 27.3% of all households were made up of individuals and 11.5% had someone living alone who was 65 years of age or older.

There were 1,217 housing units, of which 7.1% were vacant. The homeowner vacancy rate was 1.7% and the rental vacancy rate was 4.7%.

Racial composition as of the 2020 census
Race	Number	Percent
White	2,527	88.8%
Black or African American	5	0.2%
American Indian and Alaska Native	9	0.3%
Asian	13	0.5%
Native Hawaiian and Other Pacific Islander	0	0.0%
Some other race	105	3.7%
Two or more races	187	6.6%
Hispanic or Latino (of any race)	194	6.8%

=== 2010 census ===
As of the census of 2010, there were 2,674 people, 1,030 households, and 728 families living in the village. The population density was 1,883.1 inhabitants per square mile (727.1/km^{2}). There were 1,116 housing units at an average density of 785.9 per square mile (303.4/km^{2}). The racial makeup of the village was 93.1% White, 0.3% African American, 0.3% Native American, 0.2% Asian, 4.9% from other races, and 1.1% from two or more races. Hispanic or Latino of any race were 7.4% of the population.

There were 1,030 households, of which 37.3% had children under the age of 18 living with them, 50.6% were married couples living together, 13.7% had a female householder with no husband present, 6.4% had a male householder with no wife present, and 29.3% were non-families. 25.9% of all households were made up of individuals, and 10.1% had someone living alone who was 65 years of age or older. The average household size was 2.60 and the average family size was 3.11.

The median age in the village was 37.2 years. 26.9% of residents were under the age of 18; 8.1% were between the ages of 18 and 24; 26.9% were from 25 to 44; 26.7% were from 45 to 64; and 11.4% were 65 years of age or older. The gender makeup of the village was 50.2% male and 49.8% female.

=== 2000 census ===
As of the census of 2000, there were 2,803 people, 1,022 households, and 747 families living in the village. The population density was 1,857.2 inhabitants per square mile (717.1/km^{2}). There were 1,058 housing units at an average density of 701.0 per square mile (270.7/km^{2}). The racial makeup of the village was 95.54% White, 0.32% African American, 0.54% Native American, 0.36% Asian, 2.32% from other races, and 0.93% from two or more races. Hispanic or Latino of any race were 4.14% of the population.

There were 1,022 households, out of which 39.9% had children under the age of 18 living with them, 58.6% were married couples living together, 11.0% had a female householder with no husband present, 26.9% were non-families. 23.0% of all households were made up of individuals, and 8.9% had someone living alone who was 65 years of age or older. The average household size was 2.73 and the average family size was 3.24.

In the village, the population was spread out, with 30.3% under the age of 18, 7.0% from 18 to 24, 33.7% from 25 to 44, 19.7% from 45 to 64, and 9.2% who were 65 years of age or older. The median age was 33 years. For every 100 females, there were 90.9 males. For every 100 females age 18 and over, there were 87.3 males.

The median income for a household in the village was $53,984, and the median income for a family was $63,261. Males had a median income of $50,644 versus $26,667 for females. The per capita income for the village was $21,252. About 4.2% of families and 5.6% of the population were below the poverty line, including 5.8% of those under age 18 and 8.2% of those age 65 or over.

== Notable people ==
- Ryan Claridge, New England Patriots linebacker, 2005
- Travis Claridge, Atlanta Falcons offensive lineman, 2000–2003
- Robert M. Shoemaker, United States Army General
- Henry Stephens, businessman
- Marshall Sylver, motivational speaker, author, hypnotist, entertainer

== Sources ==
- CAMPOS-FARFÁN, CÉSAR, Gral. Juan N. Almonte: Insurgente, liberal y conservador, Morelia, Casa Natal de Morelos: 2, 2001.
