= Imlay Township, Michigan =

- Civil township
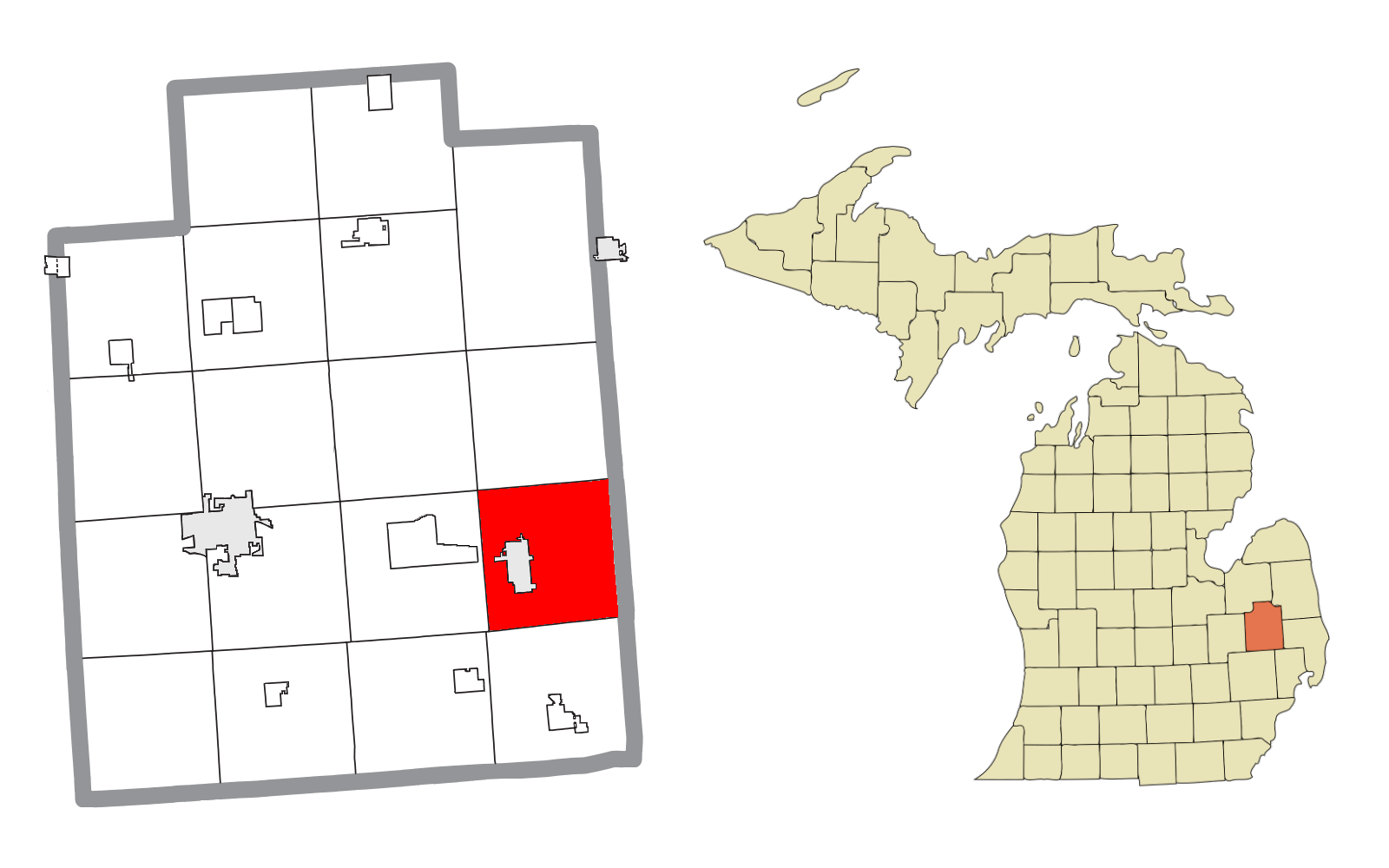
- Location within Lapeer County

- Location within the state of Michigan Location within the United States
- Coordinates: 43°00′53″N 83°02′41″W
- Country: United States
- State: Michigan
- County: Lapeer

Government
  - Supervisor: Steve Hoeksema
  - Clerk: Elizabeth Makedonsky
  - Treasurer: Debra Burns

Area
  - Total: 33.7 sq mi (87.3 km^{2})
  - Land: 33.6 sq mi (87.0 km^{2})
  - Water: 0.15 sq mi (0.4 km^{2})
- Elevation: 820 ft (250 m)

Population (2020)
  - Total: 3,115
  - Density: 92.7/sq mi (35.8/km^{2})
- Time zone: UTC-5 (Eastern (EST))
  - Summer (DST): UTC-4 (EDT)
- ZIP code: 48444
- Area code: 810
- FIPS code: 26-40300
- GNIS feature ID: 1626509
- Website: www.imlaytownship.org

Imlay Township is a civil township of Lapeer County in the U.S. state of Michigan. The population was 3,115 at the 2020 Census.

== Geography ==
According to the United States Census Bureau, the township has a total area of 33.7 square miles (87 km^{2}), of which 33.6 square miles (87 km^{2}) is land and 0.1 square miles (0.26 km^{2}) (0.42%) is water.

== Demographics ==
As of the census of 2000, there were 2,713 people, 879 households, and 736 families residing in the township. The population density was 80.8 inhabitants per square mile (31.2/km^{2}). There were 920 housing units at an average density of 27.4 per square mile (10.6/km^{2}). The racial makeup of the township was 95.98% White, 0.18% African American, 0.22% Native American, 0.48% Asian, 2.47% from other races, and 0.66% from two or more races. Hispanic or Latino of any race were 8.92% of the population.

There were 879 households, out of which 39.2% had children under the age of 18 living with them, 74.6% were married couples living together, 4.4% had a female householder with no husband present, and 16.2% were non-families. 13.1% of all households were made up of individuals, and 5.1% had someone living alone who was 65 years of age or older. The average household size was 3.02 and the average family size was 3.28.

In the township the population was spread out, with 28.2% under the age of 18, 7.7% from 18 to 24, 29.6% from 25 to 44, 24.1% from 45 to 64, and 10.4% who were 65 years of age or older. The median age was 37 years. For every 100 females, there were 100.7 males. For every 100 females age 18 and over, there were 99.1 males.

The median income for a household in the township was $60,362, and the median income for a family was $62,813. Males had a median income of $48,482 versus $26,667 for females. The per capita income for the township was $21,222. About 2.1% of families and 4.4% of the population were below the poverty line, including 2.9% of those under age 18 and 8.2% of those age 65 or over.

== See also ==
- Imlay City Community Schools
- Official website of Imlay Township
