= Michigan's 9th congressional district =

U.S. House district for Michigan

Coordinates: 42°31′47″N 83°03′17″W

- Interactive map of district boundaries since January 3, 2023
- Representative: Lisa McClain; R–Bruce Township
- Population (2025): 788,188
- Median household income: $86,534
- Ethnicity: 87.9% White; 4.1% Two or more races; 3.9% Hispanic; 2.2% Black; 1.3% Asian; 0.5% other
- Cook PVI: R+16

Michigan's 9th congressional district is a United States congressional district located in The Thumb and northern portions of Metro Detroit of the State of Michigan. Counties either wholly or partially located within the district include: Huron, Tuscola, Sanilac, Lapeer, St. Clair, Macomb and Oakland. With a Cook Partisan Voting Index rating of R+16, it is the most Republican district in Michigan.

== Recent election results from statewide races ==
Year	Office	Results
2008	President	McCain 51% - 46%
2012	President	Romney 57% - 43%
2014	Senate	Lynn Land 50% - 45%
2014	Governor	Snyder 61% - 36%
2014	Secretary of State	Johnson 66% - 30%
2014	Attorney General	Schuette 64% - 32%
2016	President	Trump 64% - 31%
2018	Senate	James 59% - 39%
2018	Governor	Schuette 57% - 40%
2018	Attorney General	Leonard 60% - 35%
2020	President	Trump 64% - 35%
2020	Senate	James 63% - 35%
2022	Governor	Dixon 57% - 41%
2022	Secretary of State	Karamo 54% - 43%
2022	Attorney General	DePerno 58% - 39%
2024	President	Trump 65% - 33%
2024	Senate	Rogers 63% - 35%

== History ==
Michigan first gained a 9th district in 1873. For most of the next 120 years, it covered most of the western shore counties starting with Muskegon and taking in a portion of Grand Traverse County. From 1983 to 1993, it also included about half of Ottawa County, Montcalm County, half of Ionia County, and two eastern townships of Kent County just outside the Grand Rapids city limits. After the 1990 census, this district essentially became the 2nd district.

The district from 1992 to 2002 was largely based in Pontiac and Flint–essentially, the successor of the old 7th district. The strong Democratic voting record in Flint and Pontiac compensated for the largely Republican lean of most of the rest of the district's area.

In 2002, this district essentially became the 5th district, while the 9th was reconfigured to take in most of the Oakland County portion of the old 11th district. The only areas that survived in the 9th congressional district across the 2002 redistricting were Pontiac, Waterford, Auburn Hills, some of Orion Township, Oakland Township, Rochester and Rochester Hills.

This district was for all practical purposes the one eliminated by the 2012 redistricting. Portions of it were parceled out to four different districts, all of which largely preserved other former districts, with the old 11th essentially becoming the new 9th.

The current 9th is mostly the successor of what had been the 10th district from 1993 to 2023. The district is currently represented by Lisa McClain.

== Counties and municipalities ==
For the 118th and successive Congresses (based on redistricting following the 2020 census), the district contains all or portions of the following counties and municipalities:

Huron County (39)

All 39 municipalities

Lapeer County (28)

All 28 municipalities

Macomb County (14)

Armada, Armada Township, Bruce Township, Chesterfield Charter Township, Lenox Township, Macomb Township (part; also 10th), Memphis (shared with St. Clair County), New Baltimore, New Haven, Ray Township, Richmond (shared with St. Clair County), Richmond Township, Romeo, Washington Charter Township

Oakland County (21)

Addison Township, Brandon Charter Township, Fenton (shared with Genesee County; part; also 7th), Groveland Township, Highland Charter Township, Holly, Holly Township, Independence Charter Township, Lake Orion, Leonard, Milford (part; also 7th), Milford Charter Township (part; also 7th), Oakland Charter Township, Orion Charter Township, Ortonville, Oxford, Oxford Charter Township, Rose Township, Springfield Charter Township, Village of Clarkston, White Lake Charter Township (part; also 11th)

St. Clair County (33)

All 33 municipalities

Sanilac County (39)

All 39 municipalities

Tuscola County (34)

Akron, Akron Township, Almer Charter Township, Arbela Township (part; also 8th) Caro, Cass City, Columbia Township, Dayton Township, Denmark Township, Elkland Township, Ellington Township, Elmwood Township, Fairgrove, Fairgrove Township, Fremont Township, Gagetown, Gilford Township, Indianfields Township, Juniata Township, Kingston, Kingston Township, Koylton Township, Mayville, Millington, Millington Township, Novesta Township, Reese, Tuscola Township, Unionville, Vassar, Vassar Township, Watertown Township, Wells Township, Wisner Township

== List of members representing the district ==
Representative	Party	Years	Cong ress	Election history
District created March 4, 1873
Jay A. Hubbell (Houghton)	Republican	March 4, 1873 – March 3, 1883	43rd 44th 45th 46th 47th	Elected in 1872. Re-elected in 1874. Re-elected in 1876. Re-elected in 1878. Re-elected in 1880. Retired.
Byron M. Cutcheon (Manistee)	Republican	March 4, 1883 – March 3, 1891	48th 49th 50th 51st	Elected in 1882. Re-elected in 1884. Re-elected in 1886. Re-elected in 1888. Lost re-election.
Harrison H. Wheeler (Ludington)	Democratic	March 4, 1891 – March 3, 1893	52nd	Elected in 1890. Lost re-election.
John W. Moon (Muskegon)	Republican	March 4, 1893 – March 3, 1895	53rd	Elected in 1892. Retired.
Roswell P. Bishop (Ludington)	Republican	March 4, 1895 – March 3, 1907	54th 55th 56th 57th 58th 59th	Elected in 1894. Re-elected in 1896. Re-elected in 1898. Re-elected in 1900. Re-elected in 1902. Re-elected in 1904. Lost renomination.
James C. McLaughlin (Muskegon)	Republican	March 4, 1907 – November 29, 1932	60th 61st 62nd 63rd 64th 65th 66th 67th 68th 69th 70th 71st 72nd	Elected in 1906. Re-elected in 1908. Re-elected in 1910. Re-elected in 1912. Re-elected in 1914. Re-elected in 1916. Re-elected in 1918. Re-elected in 1920. Re-elected in 1922. Re-elected in 1924. Re-elected in 1926. Re-elected in 1928. Re-elected in 1930. Lost re-election and died before next term.
Vacant		November 29, 1932 – March 4, 1933	72nd	
Harry W. Musselwhite (Manistee)	Democratic	March 4, 1933 – January 3, 1935	73rd	Elected in 1932. Lost re-election.
Albert J. Engel (Muskegon)	Republican	January 3, 1935 – January 3, 1951	74th 75th 76th 77th 78th 79th 80th 81st	Elected in 1934. Re-elected in 1936. Re-elected in 1938. Re-elected in 1940. Re-elected in 1942. Re-elected in 1944. Re-elected in 1946. Re-elected in 1948. Retired to run for Governor of Michigan.
Ruth Thompson (Whitehall)	Republican	January 3, 1951 – January 3, 1957	82nd 83rd 84th	Elected in 1950. Re-elected in 1952. Re-elected in 1954. Lost renomination.
Robert P. Griffin (Traverse City)	Republican	January 3, 1957 – May 11, 1966	85th 86th 87th 88th 89th	Elected in 1956. Re-elected in 1958. Re-elected in 1960. Re-elected in 1962. Re-elected in 1964. Resigned after being appointed to the US Senate.
Vacant		May 11, 1966 – November 8, 1966	89th	
Guy Vander Jagt (Luther)	Republican	November 8, 1966 – January 3, 1993	89th 90th 91st 92nd 93rd 94th 95th 96th 97th 98th 99th 100th 101st 102nd	Elected to finish Griffin's term. Also elected to the next full term. Re-elected in 1968. Re-elected in 1970. Re-elected in 1972. Re-elected in 1974. Re-elected in 1976. Re-elected in 1978. Re-elected in 1980. Re-elected in 1982. Re-elected in 1984. Re-elected in 1986. Re-elected in 1988. Re-elected in 1990. Redistricted to the 2nd district and lost renomination.
Dale Kildee (Flint)	Democratic	January 3, 1993 – January 3, 2003	103rd 104th 105th 106th 107th	Redistricted from the 7th district and re-elected in 1992. Re-elected in 1994. Re-elected in 1996. Re-elected in 1998. Re-elected in 2000. Redistricted to the 5th district.
Joe Knollenberg (Bloomfield Hills)	Republican	January 3, 2003 – January 3, 2009	108th 109th 110th	Redistricted from the 11th district and re-elected in 2002. Re-elected in 2004. Re-elected in 2006. Lost re-election.
Gary Peters (Bloomfield Township)	Democratic	January 3, 2009 – January 3, 2013	111th 112th	Elected in 2008. Re-elected in 2010. Redistricted to the 14th district.
Sander Levin (Royal Oak)	Democratic	January 3, 2013 – January 3, 2019	113th 114th 115th	Redistricted from the 12th district and re-elected in 2012. Re-elected in 2014. Re-elected in 2016. Retired.
Andy Levin (Bloomfield Township)	Democratic	January 3, 2019 – January 3, 2023	116th 117th	Elected in 2018. Re-elected in 2020. Redistricted to the 11th district and lost renomination.
Lisa McClain (Bruce Township)	Republican	January 3, 2023 – present	118th 119th	Redistricted from the 10th district and re-elected in 2022. Re-elected in 2024. Re-elected in 2026.

== Recent election results ==
=== 2006 ===
Michigan's 9th congressional district, 2006
Party	Candidate	Votes	%
Republican	Joe Knollenberg (incumbent)	142,279	51.6
Democratic	Nancy Skinner	127,651	46.2
Libertarian	Adam Goodman	3,698	1.3
Green	Matthew Abel	2,466	0.9
Total votes		276,094	100.0
Republican hold			

=== 2008 ===
Michigan's 9th congressional district, 2008
Party	Candidate	Votes	%
Democratic	Gary Peters	184,098	52.1
Republican	Joe Knollenberg (incumbent)	150,574	42.6
Independent	Jack Kevorkian	9,047	2.6
Libertarian	Adam Goodman	4,937	1.4
Green	Douglas Campbell	4,800	1.4
Total votes		353,456	100.0
Democratic gain from Republican			

=== 2010 ===
Michigan's 9th congressional district, 2010
Party	Candidate	Votes	%
Democratic	Gary Peters (incumbent)	125,730	49.8
Republican	Rocky Raczkowski	119,325	47.2
Libertarian	Adam Goodman	2,601	1.0
Green	Douglas Campbell	2,484	1.0
Independent	Bob Gray	1,866	0.7
Independent	Matthew Kuofie	644	0.3
Total votes		252,650	100.0
Democratic hold			

=== 2012 ===
Michigan's 9th congressional district, 2012
Party	Candidate	Votes	%
Democratic	Sander Levin (incumbent)	208,846	61.9
Republican	Don Volaric	114,760	34.0
Libertarian	Jim Fulner	6,100	1.8
Green	Julia Williams	4,708	1.4
U.S. Taxpayers'	Les Townsend	2,902	0.9
Total votes		337,316	100.0
Democratic hold			

=== 2014 ===
Michigan's 9th congressional district, 2014
Party	Candidate	Votes	%
Democratic	Sander Levin (incumbent)	136,342	60.4
Republican	George Brikho	81,470	36.1
Libertarian	Gregory Creswell	4,792	2.1
Green	John V. McDermott	3,153	1.4
Total votes		225,757	100.0
Democratic hold			

=== 2016 ===
Michigan's 9th congressional district, 2016
Party	Candidate	Votes	%
Democratic	Sander Levin (incumbent)	199,661	57.9
Republican	Christopher Morse	128,937	37.4
Libertarian	Matthew Orlando	9,563	2.8
Green	John V. McDermott	6,614	1.9
Total votes		344,775	100.0
Democratic hold			

=== 2018 ===
Michigan's 9th congressional district, 2018
Party	Candidate	Votes	%
Democratic	Andy Levin	181,734	59.7
Republican	Candius Stearns	112,123	36.8
Working Class	Andrea Kirby	6,797	2.2
Green	John V. McDermott	3,909	1.3
Total votes		304,563	100.0
Democratic hold			

=== 2020 ===
Michigan's 9th congressional district, 2020
Party	Candidate	Votes	%
Democratic	Andy Levin (incumbent)	230,318	57.7
Republican	Charles Langworthy	153,296	38.4
Working Class	Andrea Kirby	8,970	2.3
Libertarian	Mike Saliba	6,532	1.6
Independent	Douglas Troszak (write-in)	1	0.0
Total votes		399,117	100.0
Democratic hold			

=== 2022 ===
Michigan's 9th congressional district, 2022
Party	Candidate	Votes	%
Republican	Lisa McClain (incumbent)	238,300	63.9
Democratic	Brian Jaye	123,702	33.1
Working Class	Jim Walkowicz	6,571	1.7
Libertarian	Jacob Kelts	4,349	1.1
Total votes		372,922	100.0
Republican hold			

=== 2024 ===
Michigan's 9th congressional district, 2024
Party	Candidate	Votes	%
Republican	Lisa McClain (incumbent)	312,593	66.8
Democratic	Clinton St. Mosley	138,138	29.5
Working Class	Jim Walkowicz	12,169	2.6
Libertarian	Kevin Vayko	5,338	1.1
Total votes		468,238	100.0
Republican hold			

== Historical district boundaries ==
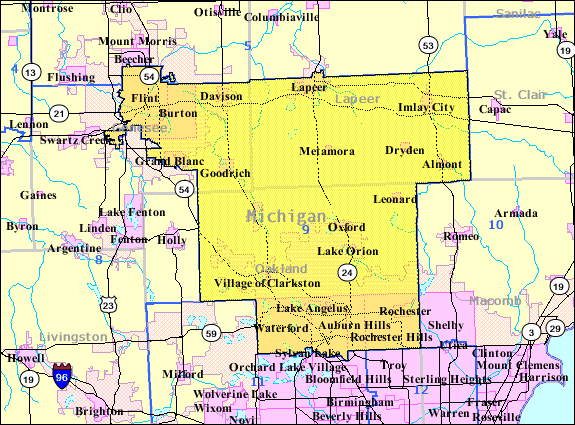
1993–2003

2003–2013

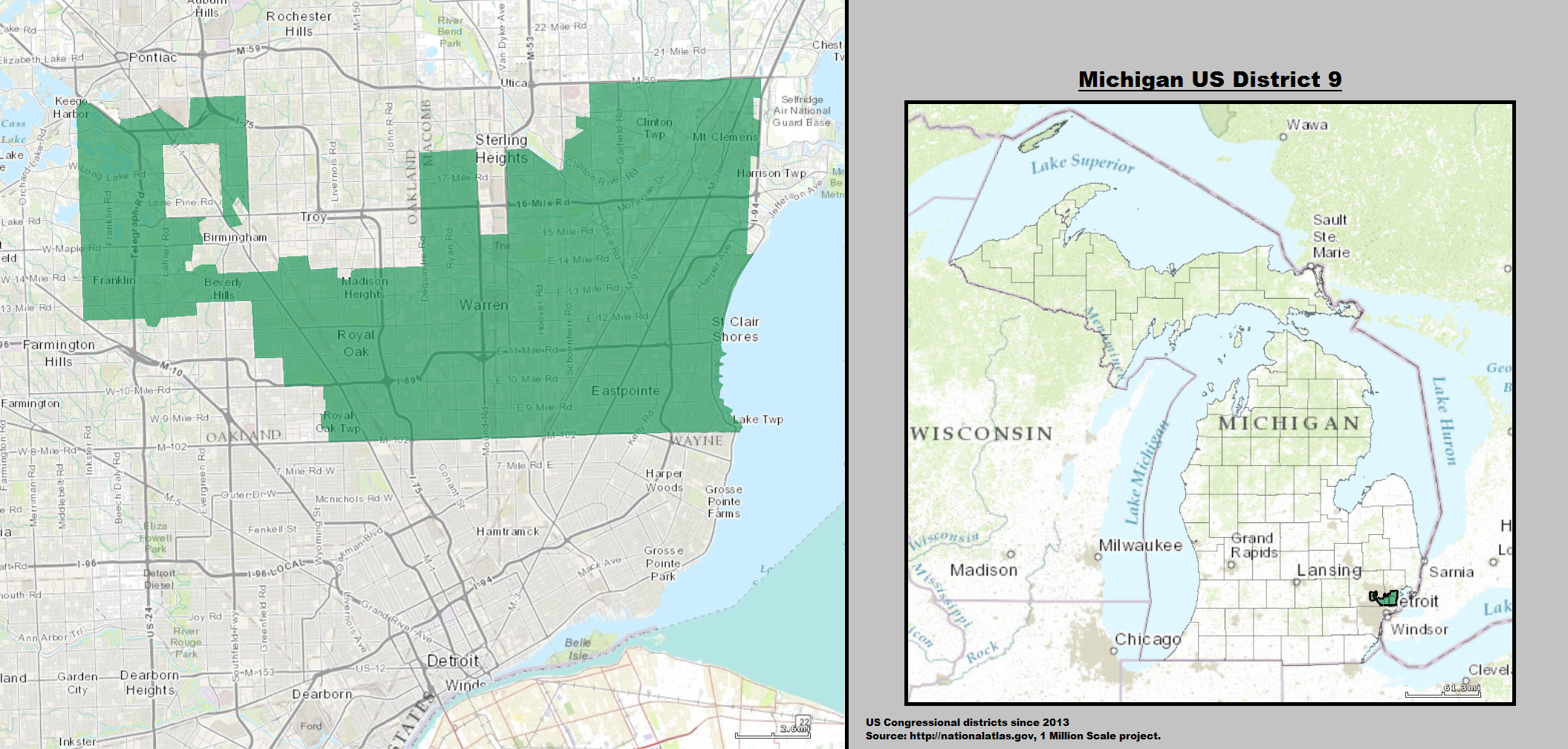
2013–2023

== See also ==
- Michigan's congressional districts
- List of United States congressional districts

== Notes ==
District boundaries were redrawn in 1993, and 2003 due to reapportionment following the censuses of 1990 and 2000.
