= Caro, Michigan =

- City
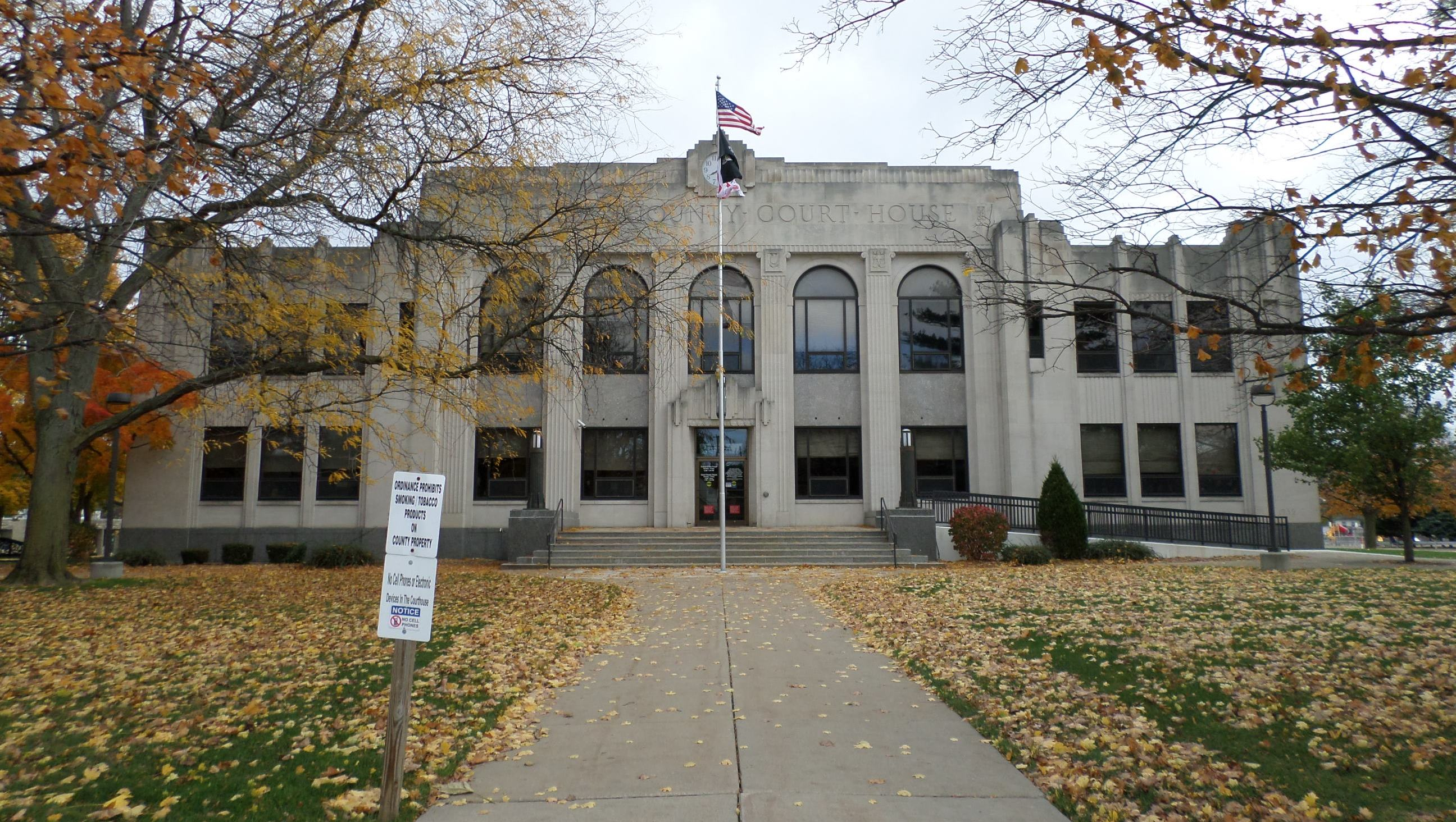
- Tuscola County Courthouse

- Location of Caro, Michigan
- Coordinates: 43°29′28″N 83°23′49″W
- Country: United States
- State: Michigan
- County: Tuscola

Government
  - Type: Council–manager
  - Mayor: Karen Snider
  - City Manager: Scott R. Czasak
  - City Council: Members: Charlotte Kish, Mayor Pro-Tem; Emily Campbell; Doreen Oedy; Heidi Parker; John Riley; Jill White

Area
  - Total: 2.95 sq mi (7.65 km^{2})
  - Land: 2.94 sq mi (7.62 km^{2})
  - Water: 0.012 sq mi (0.03 km^{2})
- Elevation: 725 ft (221 m)

Population (2023)
  - Total: 4,328
  - Density: 1,470.1/sq mi (567.61/km^{2})
- Time zone: UTC-5 (Eastern (EST))
  - Summer (DST): UTC-4 (EDT)
- ZIP code: 48723-1426
- Area code: 989
- FIPS code: 26-13420
- GNIS feature ID: 622746
- Website: http://www.carocity.net/

Caro is a city in and the county seat of Tuscola County, Michigan, United States. The population was 4,328 at the 2020 census and 4,145 at the 2000 census (an increase of 4.4%).

Caro is located northeast of Flint and east of Saginaw in Michigan's Upper Thumb region.

== History ==
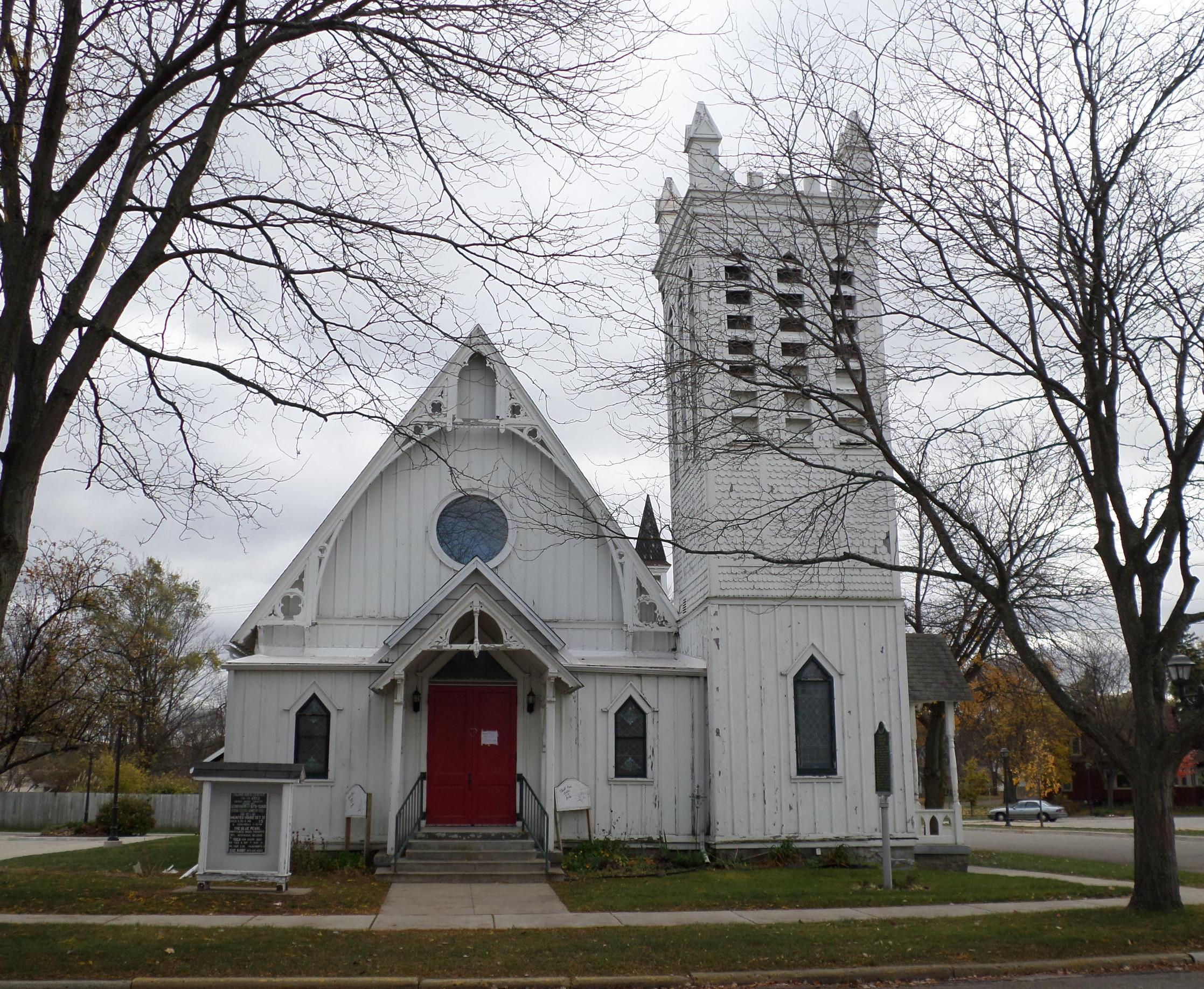
Trinity Episcopal Church

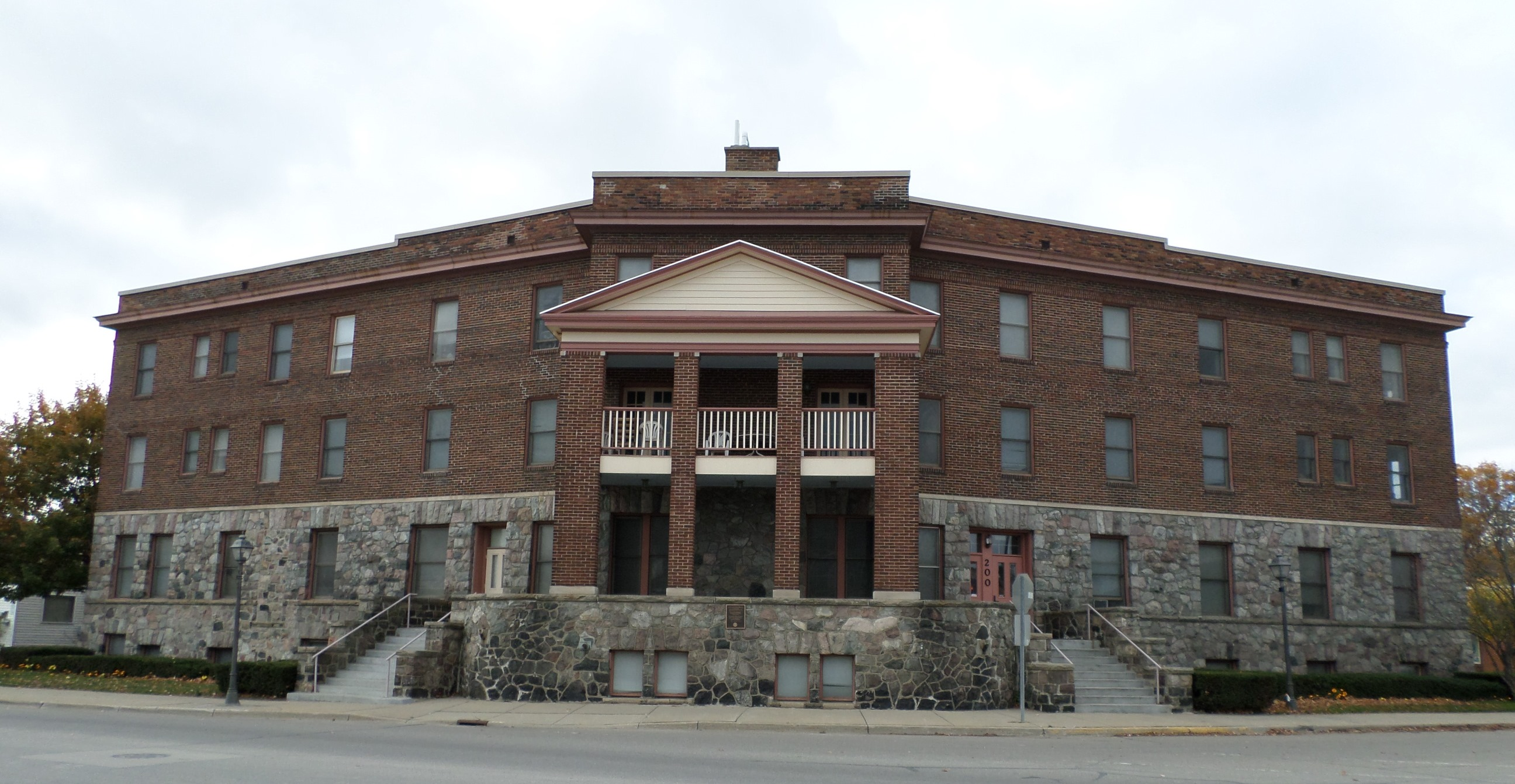
Hotel Montague

Caro was founded on the ridge just above the site of the Chippewa Village that early on stood at the Oxbow in the Cass River that was known by Native Americans as "Pe-See-Kop-To-Qua-Yone." It is now the site of the Caro Dam in Section 10, Indianfields Township, Tuscola County. Caro would be built and organized on Section 3. On Section 10, at the gate of the Chippewa Village, the logging camp that started the "boom" in logging Cass River was established by Curtis Emerson in 1848. Paschel Richardson of Tuscola Village purchased land for logging on the future site of Caro or Section 3, Indianfields Township, also in 1848. The Johnson brothers, Daniel and Soloman, began to build the City of Zilwaukee, Michigan, from Cass River Pine timber that they logged from the land at the future site of Caro and that they bought in 1849. This was how the events would align.

Gardener and Ephraim Williams about 1830 to the 1840s were agents of the American Fur Company that had a trading post on the Cass River. The post was described as at the "very short bend in the river." The bend was "shaped like a horseshoe." It was called in rough English "Skop-Ti-Qua-Nou." This was undoubtedly a slightly misspelled name for the Oxbow. Gardner Williams would purchase tracts of land next to the Chippewa Village in the 1850s that amounted in size to be more than what was the area of Caro.

Later Samuel P. Sherman would purchase 63 acres (250,000 m^{2}) in the north half of the northwest quarter of section 3 in Indianfields Township on September 8, 1852. Prior to this, only two land sales had been recorded, both for lumbering or speculative purposes. His son, William E. Sherman, had worked in the lumber industry nearby on the Cass River for some time prior to 1852 and William's favorable report persuaded his father to visit in 1851 and afterward purchased several tracts of land in addition to his initial purchase.

In the 1856-57 session of the Michigan Legislature, construction of a road was authorized from Bridgeport in Saginaw County northeast to Forestville in Sanilac County, with a route that would pass through what is now Caro. Once the road was cleared, commercial interests began to locate here. Melvin Gibbs, who had been keeping a hotel in an old log house, in 1858 put up a new frame building, known as the Gibbs House. In 1859, William E. Sherman built another hotel, which he named the Centerville House, based on the location being near the center of the county. The name Centerville became associated with the developing community.

In 1865, Centerville was selected as the county seat. A post office named Tuscola Center was established on April 25, 1866. To address the confusion caused by the differing names, community leaders met in 1868, and at the suggestion of William E. Sherman selected the name Caro, based on a variant spelling of the Egyptian city of Cairo.

On July 23, 2007, Governor Jennifer Granholm announced Caro as a community chosen by the Michigan State Housing Development Authority (MSHDA) to take part in the Blueprints for Downtowns program. The city would receive a comprehensive, market-driven strategy toward developing an action-oriented downtown that would result in economic growth, job creation and private investments.

Caro residents voted in favor of changing to the status of a city on November 3, 2009. Village President Tom Striffler was elected to the position of mayor. Elected to the city council were Mike Henry, Rick Lipan, Joe Greene, Charlotte Kish, Amanda Langmaid, and Richard Pouliot.

== Geography ==
According to the United States Census Bureau, the city has a total area of 2.80 square miles (7.25 km^{2}), of which 2.79 square miles (7.23 km^{2}) is land and 0.01 square miles (0.03 km^{2}) is water.

Caro is located in central Tuscola County, surrounded by Indianfields Township on its west, south, and east. Almer Township borders the northern part of the city. The Caro post office, with ZIP code 48723, also serves nearly all of Indianfields and Almer townships, as well as smaller portions of Wells Township to the east of Indianfields, Dayton Township to the southeast of Indianfields, Fremont Township to the south of Indianfields, Juniata Township to the west of Indianfields, Fairgrove Township to the northwest of Indianfields, Columbia Township, to the north of Almer, Elmwood Township to the northeast of Almer, and Ellington Township to the east of Almer.

== Transportation ==
- M-24
- M-81

The city is served by the Tuscola Area Airport (also known as the Caro Municipal Airport), located approximately three miles southwest of the city. Founded in 1930, the airport was significantly improved under Michigan Department of Transportation grants throughout the 1980s and 1990s, to add and lengthen the runway and taxi-ways, as well as a new administration building and additional hangar space.

== Demographics ==
Historical population
Census	Pop.	Note	%±
1880	1,282		—
1890	1,701		32.7%
1900	2,006		17.9%
1910	2,272		13.3%
1920	2,704		19.0%
1930	2,554		−5.5%
1940	3,070		20.2%
1950	3,464		12.8%
1960	3,534		2.0%
1970	4,322		22.3%
1980	4,317		−0.1%
1990	4,054		−6.1%
2000	4,145		2.2%
2010	4,229		2.0%
2020	4,328		2.3%
2023 (est.)	4,272		−1.3%
U.S. Decennial Census

=== 2020 census ===
As of the 2020 census, Caro had a population of 4,328. The median age was 40.4 years. 22.1% of residents were under the age of 18 and 22.1% of residents were 65 years of age or older. For every 100 females there were 85.4 males, and for every 100 females age 18 and over there were 83.1 males age 18 and over.

98.5% of residents lived in urban areas, while 1.5% lived in rural areas.

There were 1,828 households in Caro, of which 25.3% had children under the age of 18 living in them. Of all households, 34.1% were married-couple households, 20.4% were households with a male householder and no spouse or partner present, and 37.2% were households with a female householder and no spouse or partner present. About 39.4% of all households were made up of individuals and 16.9% had someone living alone who was 65 years of age or older.

There were 2,009 housing units, of which 9.0% were vacant. The homeowner vacancy rate was 1.7% and the rental vacancy rate was 9.9%.

Racial composition as of the 2020 census
Race	Number	Percent
White	3,886	89.8%
Black or African American	51	1.2%
American Indian and Alaska Native	22	0.5%
Asian	34	0.8%
Native Hawaiian and Other Pacific Islander	0	0.0%
Some other race	49	1.1%
Two or more races	286	6.6%
Hispanic or Latino (of any race)	282	6.5%

=== 2010 census ===
As of the census of 2010, there were 4,229 people, 1,777 households, and 1,015 families residing in the city. The population density was 1,515.8 inhabitants per square mile (585.3/km^{2}). There were 1,987 housing units at an average density of 712.2 per square mile (275.0/km^{2}). The racial makeup of the city was 95.5% White, 0.7% African American, 0.4% Native American, 0.8% Asian, 1.2% from other races, and 1.5% from two or more races. Hispanic or Latino of any race were 5.3% of the population.

There were 1,777 households, of which 28.6% had children under the age of 18 living with them, 36.9% were married couples living together, 15.4% had a female householder with no husband present, 4.9% had a male householder with no wife present, and 42.9% were non-families. 36.3% of all households were made up of individuals, and 14.5% had someone living alone who was 65 years of age or older. The average household size was 2.22 and the average family size was 2.88.

The median age in the city was 39.6 years. 21.8% of residents were under the age of 18; 10.3% were between the ages of 18 and 24; 24.3% were from 25 to 44; 25% were from 45 to 64; and 18.8% were 65 years of age or older. The gender makeup of the city was 46.3% male and 53.7% female.

=== 2000 census ===
As of the census of 2000, there were 4,145 people, 1,738 households, and 1,042 families residing in the village. The population density was 1,746.0 inhabitants per square mile (674.1/km^{2}). There were 1,899 housing units at an average density of 799.9 per square mile (308.8/km^{2}). The racial makeup of the village was 94.62% White, 0.55% African American, 1.01% Native American, 0.87% Asian, 0.05% Pacific Islander, 1.95% from other races, and 0.94% from two or more races. Hispanic or Latino of any race were 4.08% of the population.

There were 1,738 households, out of which 29.6% had children under the age of 18 living with them, 42.6% were married couples living together, 13.5% had a female householder with no husband present, and 40.0% were non-families. 35.1% of all households were made up of individuals, and 16.3% had someone living alone who was 65 years of age or older. The average household size was 2.31 and the average family size was 2.95.

In the village the population was spread out, with 24.7% under the age of 18, 9.8% from 18 to 24, 26.3% from 25 to 44, 22.9% from 45 to 64, and 16.3% who were 65 years of age or older. The median age was 37 years. For every 100 females, there were 82.4 males. For every 100 females age 18 and over, there were 78.8 males.

The median income for a household in the village was $31,226, and the median income for a family was $39,432. Males had a median income of $36,307 versus $25,833 for females. The per capita income for the village was $17,152. About 5.1% of families and 11.1% of the population were below the poverty line, including 11.4% of those under age 18 and 7.0% of those age 65 or over.

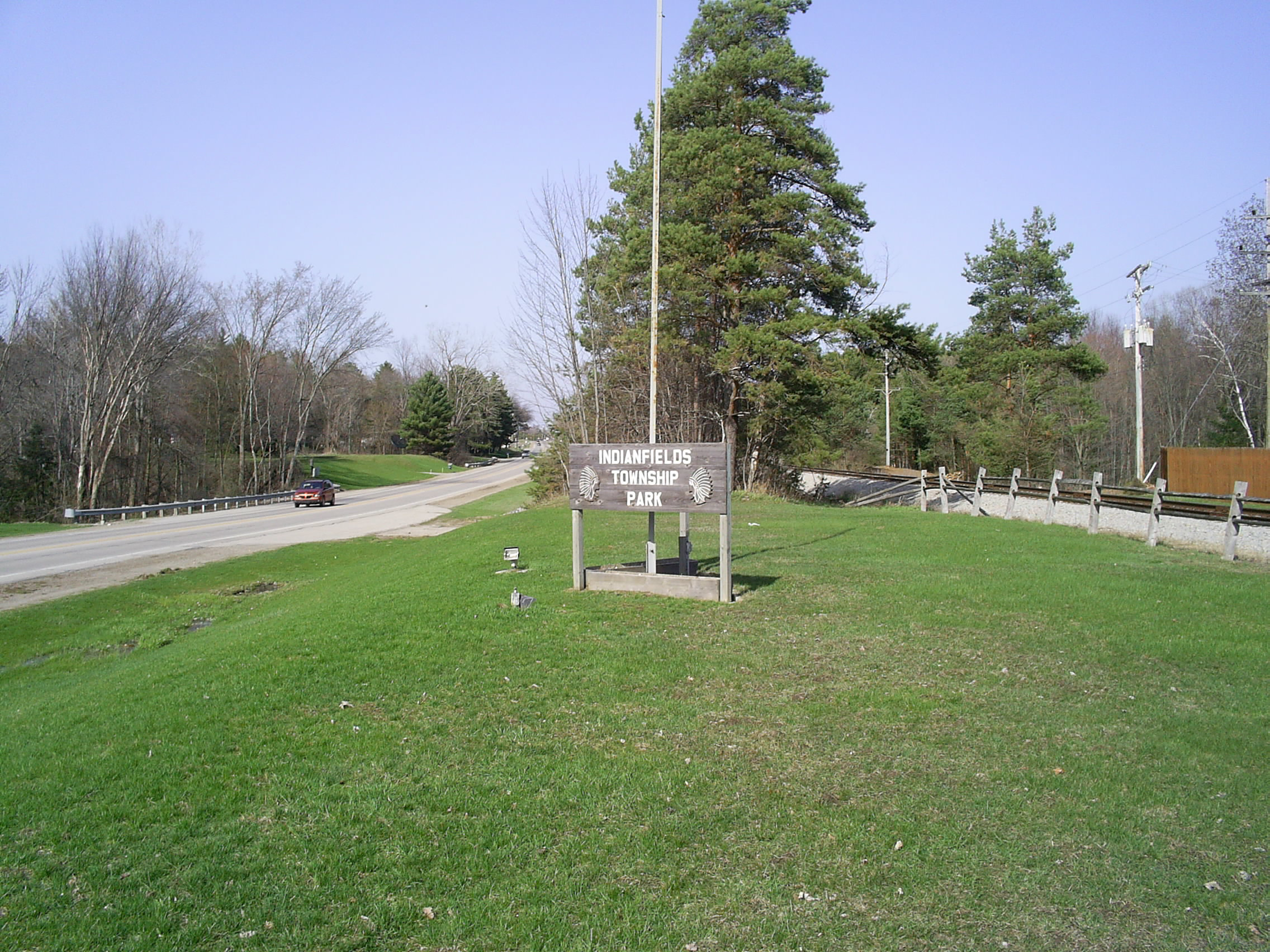
Indian Fields Park

== Industry ==
Caro is the home of a Michigan Sugar facility. Local sugarbeet farmers retain joint ownership of the plant.

In 2003, Michigan Ethanol, a partner of Poet Biorefining, opened a corn ethanol production facility in southwest Caro.

The Caro Center, a mental health facility operated by the state of Michigan, originally opened as a support center for individuals with epilepsy and operated as a self-supportive community, producing its own vegetables and maintaining livestock. Following, it converted to an institution for the developmentally disabled, and now operates as an inpatient psychiatric hospital for mentally ill adults.

The former Camp Tuscola, which was a state correctional facility until 2005, is now a residential re-entry program.

== Media ==
=== Radio ===
Local radio stations licensed to serve Caro are commercial broadcasters WKYO AM and WIDL FM.

==== FM ====
- WCTP 88.5 FM, Gagetown, Gospel, Christian Gospel Radio
- WSMB 89.3 FM, Harbor Beach, Religious, Smile FM
- WIDL 92.1 FM, Cass City, Classic Rock The Thumb's Only Road for Pure Classic Rock
- WBGV 92.5 FM, Marlette, Country, The Thumb's Best Country
- WRCL 93.7 FM, Frankenmuth, Urban CHR, Today's Hottest Jamz
- WHNN 96.1 FM, Bay City, Adult Contemporary, The Best Variety of Yesterday and Today
- WMJO 97.3 FM, Essexville, Classic Hits/Adult Hits, Joe Plays Everything
- WTGV 97.7 FM, Sandusky, Adult Contemporary, Light and Easy Listening
- WKCQ 98.1 FM, Saginaw, Country, The Most Country
- WOWE 98.9 FM, Vassar, Urban AC, Jammin' Oldies
- WWBN 101.5 FM, Tuscola, Active Rock, The Banana, Flint's Rock Radio
- WLEW 102.1 FM, Bad Axe, Classic Hits, Your Classic Hits Station
- WIOG 102.5 FM, Bay City, CHR/Top 40, The Hit Music Channel
- WCZE 103.7 FM, Harbor Beach, Christian Country, Positive Country
- WTLZ 107.1 FM, Saginaw, Urban AC, Simply the Best R&B

==== AM ====
- WMIC 660 AM, Sandusky (Daytime Only), Full Service/Country, The Thumb's Information Station
- WSGW 790 AM, Saginaw, News/Talk, Your Connection to the Saginaw Valley and the World
- WJMK 1250 AM, Bridgeport, Oldies, MeTV FM
- WTRX 1330 AM, Flint, Sports, Mid-Michigan's Biggest Athletic Supporter
- WLEW 1340 AM, Bad Axe, Country, The Thumb's Hottest Country
- WKYO 1360 AM, Caro, Oldies, Your Greatest Hits
- WMAX 1440 AM, Bay City, Religious Talk, Ave Marie Radio
- WFNT 1470 AM, Flint, News/Talk, Flint's News Talk
- WLCO 1530 AM, Lapeer, Classic Country, Real Country, Today's Stars and Legends

=== Newspapers ===
- Daily editions of the Detroit Free Press and The Detroit News, four-day-per-week editions of the Bay City Times and Saginaw News, as well as the "Tuscola County Advertiser" and Vassar Pioneer Times are available.

=== Broadcast television ===
Tuscola County lies inside the Flint/Tri-Cities Television Market. Only stations available on Charter in the Caro area are listed below.

- WNEM 5 (CBS/MyNetworkTV)
- WJRT 12 (ABC)
- WDCQ 19 (PBS)
- WEYI 25 (NBC)
- WBSF 46 (The CW)
- WAQP 49 (TCT)
- WSMH 66 (Fox)

== Climate ==
This climatic region is typified by large seasonal temperature differences, with warm to hot (and often humid) summers and cold (sometimes severely cold) winters. According to the Köppen Climate Classification system, Caro has a humid continental climate, abbreviated "Dfb" on climate maps.

July averages 71 °F (21 °C), with high temperatures reaching 90 °F (32 °C) an average of 17 days per year. The average high temperature in July is 86 °F (30 °C). January averages 23 °F (-5 °C), with an average monthly low of 15 °F (-9 °C).

Climate data for Caro WWTP, Michigan (1991–2020 normals, extremes 1928–present)
Month	Jan	Feb	Mar	Apr	May	Jun	Jul	Aug	Sep	Oct	Nov	Dec	Year
Record high °F (°C)	73 (23)	69 (21)	87 (31)	90 (32)	94 (34)	102 (39)	108 (42)	101 (38)	102 (39)	89 (32)	80 (27)	69 (21)	108 (42)
Mean daily maximum °F (°C)	29.4 (−1.4)	31.5 (−0.3)	41.7 (5.4)	55.3 (12.9)	68.0 (20.0)	78.1 (25.6)	81.9 (27.7)	79.9 (26.6)	72.9 (22.7)	59.8 (15.4)	46.1 (7.8)	34.6 (1.4)	56.6 (13.7)
Daily mean °F (°C)	22.0 (−5.6)	23.1 (−4.9)	32.4 (0.2)	44.4 (6.9)	56.4 (13.6)	66.3 (19.1)	70.7 (21.5)	68.6 (20.3)	61.5 (16.4)	49.7 (9.8)	38.3 (3.5)	28.3 (−2.1)	46.8 (8.2)
Mean daily minimum °F (°C)	14.6 (−9.7)	14.8 (−9.6)	23.1 (−4.9)	33.5 (0.8)	44.8 (7.1)	54.6 (12.6)	59.6 (15.3)	57.4 (14.1)	50.1 (10.1)	39.6 (4.2)	30.5 (−0.8)	22.1 (−5.5)	37.1 (2.8)
Record low °F (°C)	−25 (−32)	−30 (−34)	−20 (−29)	6 (−14)	22 (−6)	28 (−2)	34 (1)	32 (0)	21 (−6)	12 (−11)	−2 (−19)	−18 (−28)	−30 (−34)
Average precipitation inches (mm)	2.18 (55)	1.63 (41)	1.92 (49)	3.59 (91)	3.69 (94)	3.58 (91)	3.48 (88)	3.32 (84)	3.21 (82)	3.11 (79)	2.47 (63)	2.12 (54)	34.30 (871)
Average snowfall inches (cm)	13.1 (33)	8.0 (20)	5.5 (14)	1.0 (2.5)	0.0 (0.0)	0.0 (0.0)	0.0 (0.0)	0.0 (0.0)	0.0 (0.0)	0.0 (0.0)	2.3 (5.8)	11.7 (30)	41.6 (106)
Average precipitation days (≥ 0.01 in)	13.1	9.9	9.5	12.0	13.2	10.4	10.5	10.5	10.1	12.6	12.1	12.7	136.6
Average snowy days (≥ 0.1 in)	7.8	5.7	3.1	0.8	0.0	0.0	0.0	0.0	0.0	0.0	1.7	6.4	25.5
Source: NOAA
