= M-81 (Michigan highway) =

State highway in Michigan, United States

M-81
- M-81 highlighted in red

Route information
- Maintained by MDOT
- Length: 45.636 mi (73.444 km)
- Existed: c. July 1, 1919–present

Major junctions
- West end: M-13 in Saginaw
- I-75 / US 23 near Saginaw; M-15 near Reese; M-24 in Caro
- East end: M-53 near Cass City

Location
- Country: United States
- State: Michigan
- Counties: Saginaw, Tuscola, Sanilac

Highway system
- Michigan State Trunkline Highway System; Interstate; US; State; Byways
| ← M-80 | → M-82 |

M-81 is an east–west state trunkline highway in the Lower Peninsula of the US state of Michigan. The trunkline travels from the city of Saginaw at the junction with M-13 to the junction with M-53 east of Cass City over the county line in Greenleaf Township in northwestern Sanilac County in The Thumb area of the state. Outside of the cities and villages along its route, M-81 passes through mostly rural farm country. Near Saginaw it intersects the freeway that carries both Interstate 75 (I-75) and US Highway 23 (US 23) in an industrial area.

A road bearing the M-81 designation has existed since at least July 1, 1919, when the state initially numbered its trunkline highways. Since that time, it has been extended, rerouted or shortened several times. These changes resulted in essentially the modern highway routing by 1926; the highway was fully paved in the 1940s. A change made in 1929 was reversed in 1933, and an extension through downtown Saginaw in the 1960s was overturned in the 1970s. The last change was the construction of a pair of roundabouts at the I-75/US 23 interchange in 2006.

== Route description ==
M-81 starts at a junction with M-13, with the two directions of each highway separated by a median. This central feature ends for M-81 immediately east of the intersection as the highway runs east out of Saginaw. The trunkline follows Washington Road easterly through residential subdivisions to an interchange with I-75/US 23 in an industrial area of Buena Vista Township. This interchange, exit 151 along the freeway, is built with roundabouts on either side of the bridge that carries Washington Road over the freeway in a variant of the diamond interchange design called a dumbbell interchange. After leaving the industrial properties on the east side of I-75/US 23, M-81 follows Washington Road through a mixture of farm fields and residential subdivisions. North of the community of Arthur, the highway intersects M-15 (Vassar Road). Further east, M-81 crosses out of Saginaw County; across the border in Tuscola County, the highway follows Saginaw Road.

In the village of Reese, M-81 crosses the Huron and Eastern Railway twice. East of town, the highway follows Caro Road through more farm fields through the community of Watrousville. Near the south side of the Tuscola Area Airport, M-81 turns to the northeast running along the Cass River to Caro. In the city, the trunkline follows State Street past the fairgrounds. At the intersection with Ellington Street, M-81 crosses M-24. The highway continues northeasterly out of town and through the community of Ellington. Northeast of Elmwood, M-81 turns due east along Cass City Road. The trunkline runs to the village of Cass City where it follows Main Street through residential neighborhoods and the central business district. East of Cass City, the highway crosses the Cass River before crossing the county line into Sanilac County. Approximately one mile (1.6 km) into the county, M-81 ends at the intersection with M-53 (Van Dyke Road).

M-81 is maintained by the Michigan Department of Transportation (MDOT) like other state highways in Michigan. As a part of these maintenance responsibilities, the department tracks the volume of traffic that uses the roadways under its jurisdiction. These volumes are expressed using a metric called annual average daily traffic, which is a statistical calculation of the average daily number of vehicles on a segment of roadway. MDOT's surveys in 2010 showed that the highest traffic levels along M-81 were the 17,839 vehicles daily between Van Gelsen Road and Frank Street in Caro; the lowest counts were the 3,527 vehicles per day east of Cass City to the M-53 intersection. No sections of M-81 have been listed on the National Highway System, a network of roads important to the country's economy, defense, and mobility.

== History ==
When originally signed around July 1, 1919, M-81 ran from Bay City southeast and east to the Munger area; from there it ran south concurrently with M-31 to the Reese area before running northeasterly to the east of Cass City to M-53. By 1921, the eastern end was extended southerly from Caro to Mayville along a highway that is now part of M-24. In late 1926, the western end was changed so that M-81 followed the former M-31 from Reese into Saginaw and the eastern end was rerouted from Caro northeasterly to the Cass City area. With the exception of the routing through downtown Saginaw, the highway followed the approximate routing of the current highway.

In the latter half of 1929, the highway was rerouted between Saginaw and Reese, using a set of parallel roadways to the south of the previous routing; this change was reversed in 1933. M-81 was fully paved when the last section between Ellington and Elmwood in Tuscola County was finished in late 1946 or early 1947.

Starting in 1953, the westernmost approximately one mile (1.6 km) of M-81 was also used for a US 23 concurrency. When the bypass of Saginaw was completed in late 1961, M-81 was extended along M-13 southwesterly into downtown Saginaw where it turned west across the Saginaw River to Midland Road west of the city. This routing across the city was removed in 1971 when I-675 was completed; west of that freeway the highway became M-58, the rest was either removed from the highway system and turned back to local control, or it had the M-81 designation removed. Since this truncation, M-81 has ended at its junction with M-13 north of downtown Saginaw. In 2006, MDOT completed the reconstruction of the interchange between M-81 and I-75/US to incorporate a pair of roundabouts along Washington Road.

== Major intersections ==
| County | Location | mi | km | Destinations | Notes |
|---|---|---|---|---|---|
| Saginaw | Saginaw | 0.000 | 0.000 | M-13 – Saginaw, Bay City | |
| Saginaw | Buena Vista Township | 0.969– 1.212 | 1.559– 1.951 | I-75 / US 23 – Mackinac Bridge, Flint | Exit 151 on I-75/US 23; dumbbell interchange |
| Saginaw | Blumfield Township | 7.892 | 12.701 | M-15 – Bay City, Vassar | |
| Tuscola | Caro | 27.619 | 44.448 | M-24 – Unionville, Lapeer | |
| Sanilac | Greenleaf Township | 45.636 | 73.444 | M-53 – Bad Axe, Imlay City | |
1.000 mi = 1.609 km; 1.000 km = 0.621 mi
