= Dayton, Michigan =

Dayton, Michigan may refer to:

- Dayton, Berrien County, Michigan, an unincorporated community situated on Dayton Lake
- Dayton, Tuscola County, Michigan, also known as Daytona Station, an unincorporated community in Wells Township
- Dayton Township, Newaygo County, Michigan
- Dayton Township, Tuscola County, Michigan

== See also ==
- Dayton Center, Michigan, an unincorporated community in Dayton Township, Newaygo County
- East Dayton, an unincorporated community on the border of Wells Township and Dayton Township in Tuscola County
