= Danny Schell =

American baseball player (1927-1972)

- Outfielder
- Born: December 26, 1927; Fostoria, Michigan, U.S.
- Died: May 11, 1972 (aged 44); Mayville, Michigan, U.S.
- Batted: Right Threw: Right

MLB debut
- April 13, 1954, for the Philadelphia Phillies

Last MLB appearance
- April 22, 1955, for the Philadelphia Phillies

MLB statistics
- Batting average: .281
- Home runs: 7
- Runs batted in: 33
- Stats at Baseball Reference

Teams
- Philadelphia Phillies (1954–1955)

Clyde Daniel Schell (December 26, 1927 – May 11, 1972) was an American professional baseball player. The outfielder and native of Fostoria, Michigan attended Millington Jr./Sr. High School and appeared in 94 games for the Philadelphia Phillies of Major League Baseball, 92 of them in 1954 and two in 1955.

== Career ==
Schell threw and batted right-handed, stood 6 feet 1 inch (1.85 m) tall and weighed 195 pounds (88 kg). He signed with Philadelphia in 1948 and in 1953 led the Class A Eastern League in both hits (185) and batting average (.333). The following season, he made the 1954 Philles' Major League roster out of spring training and stuck for the entire season. He alternated in left field with veteran Del Ennis, starting in 58 games. For the year, Schell collected 77 hits, including 14 doubles, three triples and seven home runs. On June 26, he had four hits in four at bats, including a double and a home run, to help defeat the Milwaukee Braves 10–3 and earn pitcher Robin Roberts his tenth victory of the season.

Schell went hitless in two at bats as a pinch hitter in April 1955 and was sent to the St. Louis Cardinals' organization. He played at Triple-A for the rest of his pro career, which ended after 11 seasons in 1958.

== Death ==
He died from a heart attack at the age of 44 in Mayville, Michigan.
