= Watertown Township, Tuscola County, Michigan =

Watertown Township, Michigan
- Township
- Location within the state of Michigan
- Coordinates: 43°16′13″N 83°24′16″W
- Country: United States
- State: Michigan
- County: Tuscola

Area
  - Total: 32.9 sq mi (85.2 km^{2})
  - Land: 32.7 sq mi (84.6 km^{2})
  - Water: 0.23 sq mi (0.6 km^{2})
- Elevation: 879 ft (268 m)

Population (2020)
  - Total: 2,091
  - Density: 64.0/sq mi (24.7/km^{2})
- Time zone: UTC-5 (Eastern (EST))
  - Summer (DST): UTC-4 (EDT)
- ZIP codes: 48435 (Fostoria); 48464 (Otter Lake), 48744 (Mayville), 48746 (Millington)
- FIPS code: 26-84460
- GNIS feature ID: 1627223
- Website: http://www.watertowntownship.org/

Watertown Township is a civil township of Tuscola County in the U.S. state of Michigan. The population was 2,091 at the 2020 census.

== Communities ==
- Fostoria is an unincorporated community in the southeast part of the township at 43°15′12″N 83°22′19″W. Michigan Governor Henry H. Crapo once owned most of the pine forestland in the area and had a line of the Pere Marquette Railway run through here. It was named for Crapo's foreman, Thomas Foster in 1881 and had a post office from July 1882 until May 1883. Fostoria and the surrounding area is currently served by the ZIP code 48435, which also serves a large portion of the southeast portion of Watertown Township, as well as portions of three townships in adjacent Lapeer County: Rich Township to the east, Deerfield Township to the southeast, and Marathon Township to the south.
- Otter Lake is a village to the south straddling the boundary of Genesee County and Lapeer County; the Otter Lake ZIP code 48464 serves a portion of the southern part of Watertown Township.
- Mayville is to the north within Fremont Township; the Mayville ZIP code 48744 serves the northeast part of Watertown Township.
- Millington is to the west within Millington Township; the Millington ZIP code 48746 serves the western portion of Watertown Township.

== Geography ==
According to the United States Census Bureau, the township has a total area of 32.9 square miles (85.2 km^{2}), of which 32.7 square miles (84.6 km^{2}) is land and 0.2 square mile (0.6 km^{2}) (0.76%) is water.

== Demographics ==
As of the census of 2000, there were 2,231 people, 796 households, and 631 families residing in the township. The population density was 68.3 inhabitants per square mile (26.4/km^{2}). There were 874 housing units at an average density of 26.8 per square mile (10.3/km^{2}). The racial makeup of the township was 98.43% White, 0.18% African American, 0.58% Native American, 0.04% Asian, 0.22% from other races, and 0.54% from two or more races. Hispanic or Latino of any race were 0.72% of the population.

There were 796 households, out of which 36.9% had children under the age of 18 living with them, 68.0% were married couples living together, 7.4% had a female householder with no husband present, and 20.7% were non-families. 17.3% of all households were made up of individuals, and 6.4% had someone living alone who was 65 years of age or older. The average household size was 2.80 and the average family size was 3.14.

In the township the population was spread out, with 28.1% under the age of 18, 8.2% from 18 to 24, 29.3% from 25 to 44, 24.0% from 45 to 64, and 10.5% who were 65 years of age or older. The median age was 37 years. For every 100 females, there were 107.5 males. For every 100 females age 18 and over, there were 106.0 males.

The median income for a household in the township was $46,875, and the median income for a family was $52,589. Males had a median income of $45,703 versus $22,500 for females. The per capita income for the township was $20,398. About 4.9% of families and 7.6% of the population were below the poverty line, including 10.5% of those under age 18 and 5.7% of those age 65 or over.
