= M81 =

M81 or M-81 may refer to:

- M-81 (Michigan highway), a state highway in Michigan
- McDonnell-Douglas MD81
- Messier 81, a spiral galaxy in the constellation Ursa Major, also known as NGC 3031 or Bode's Galaxy
- U.S. Woodland, a camouflage pattern colloquially known by the name as "M81"
