= Tuscola Area Airport =

- IATA: TZC; ICAO: KCFS; FAA LID: CFS

Summary
- Airport type: Public
- Owner: Tuscola Area Airport Authority
- Serves: Caro, Michigan, United States
- Elevation AMSL: 701 ft / 214 m
- Coordinates: 43°27′31″N 083°26′43″W
- Website: www.flytaa.org

Map
- Location of airport in Michigan CFS (the United States)

Runways
Direction	Length		Surface
Direction	ft	m	Surface
05/23	4,300	1,311	Asphalt
12/30	2,300	701	Turf

Statistics (2021)
- Aircraft operations: 13,870
- Based aircraft: 31
- Source: Federal Aviation Administration

Tuscola Area Airport (IATA: TZC, ICAO: KCFS, FAA LID: CFS, formerly 78D) is a public use airport located three nautical miles (6 km) southwest of the central business district of Caro, a city in Tuscola County, Michigan, United States. It is owned by the Tuscola Area Airport Authority. It is included in the Federal Aviation Administration (FAA) National Plan of Integrated Airport Systems for 2017–2021, in which it is categorized as a local general aviation facility. Many U.S. airports use the same three-letter location identifier for the FAA and IATA. However, this airport is assigned CFS by the FAA but has been assigned TZC from the IATA. Note that CFS was assigned to Coffs Harbour Airport in Coffs Harbour, New South Wales, Australia.

== Facilities and aircraft ==
Tuscola Area Airport covers an area of 260 acres (110 ha) at an elevation of 701 feet (214 m) above mean sea level. It has two runways: 5/23 is 4,300 by 75 feet (1,311 x 23 m) with an asphalt pavement; 12/30 is 2,300 by 110 feet (701 x 34 m) with a turf surface. The airport is not staffed regularly.

In 2022, the airport received a grant to resurface and reconstruct parts of its runway. Runway lights were also upgraded, and the airport was granted an additional 80 acres of land. There are hopes to add a new crosswind runway in the future.

The airport has a fixed-base operator that sells fuel.

For the 12-month period ending December 31, 2021, the airport had 13,870 general aviation aircraft operations, an average of 38 per day. At that time there were 31 aircraft based on the field: 30 single-engine airplanes and 1 helicopter.

=== Transit ===
The airport is accessible by road from M-81, and is close to M-24.

== See also ==
- List of airports in Michigan
