= Tuscola County Courthouse =

- U.S. National Register of Historic Places
- Michigan State Historic Site
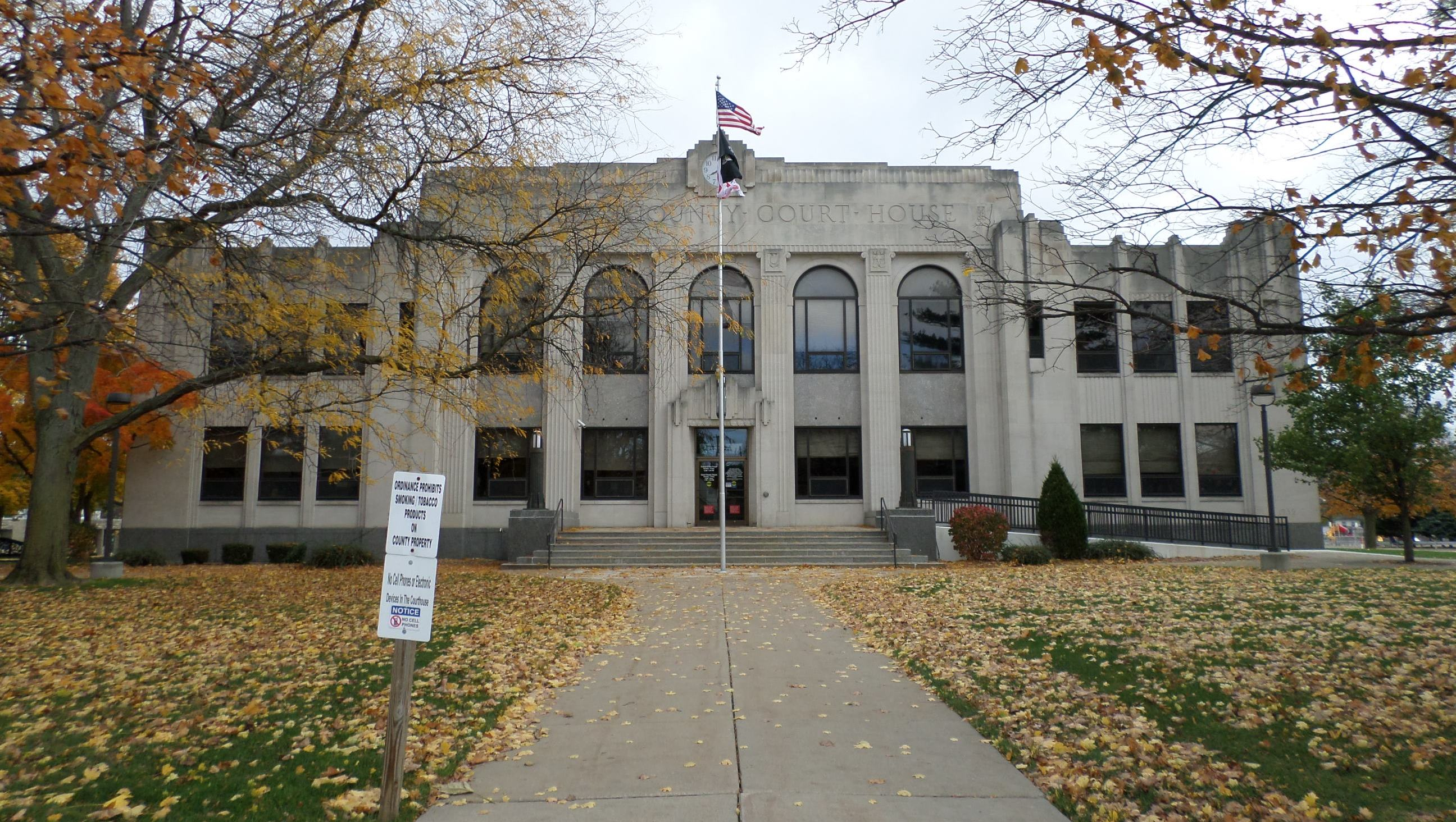

- Location within Michigan Location within the United States
- Interactive map showing the Tuscola County Courthouse
- Location: 440 N. State St., Caro, Michigan
- Coordinates: 43°29′27″N 83°23′35″W
- Area: 1 acre (0.40 ha)
- Built: 1932
- Architect: William H. Kuni
- Architectural style: Art Deco
- NRHP reference No.: 96001419
- Added to NRHP: December 6, 1996

The Tuscola County Courthouse is a government building located at 440 North State Street in Caro, Michigan. It was listed on the National Register of Historic Places in 1996.

== History ==
Tuscola County was established in 1840 as part of Saginaw County, but in 1850 was authorized to establish its own county government. Vassar was selected as the first county seat, but a prolonged dispute over the location, begun in 1860, ended with Caro being designated the county seat in 1867. An unused church building was moved into Caro to serve as the first courthouse until 1872, when a new stone-and-brick courthouse was erected.

By the 1920s, the 1873 courthouse was considered too small, and in 1926 voters approved a one mill tax to raise $300,000 to fund a new courthouse. In 1931 a building committee was established, which reviewed multiple proposals, accepting plans from Detroit architect William H. Kuni, who also designed the Alpena County Courthouse. Contractors were hired, and demolition of the old courthouse and construction of the new one began in 1932. The building was completed in 1933, and continues to serve the county.

== Description ==
The Tuscola County Courthouse is a rectangular, two-story, Art Deco building measuring 120 feet by 75 feet. The exterior walls are steel frame faced with Indiana limestone on a granite-faced foundation. The facade has a central mass with slightly lower wings to each side which project slightly forward. The grounds are nearly level with the entryway, which is reached via a six-step staircase. The main block contains five vertical bands of windows separated by projecting piers. Windows are square-headed on the first floor and round-arched on the second. The piers support an entablature which reads "TUSCOLA - COUNTY - COURT - HOUSE"

The interior is reached through a recessed entryway, which leads into a vestibule and then the lobby. A stair accesses the second-floor lobby and the courtroom. In the public spaces, the floors are terrazzo and the walls are pink marble. A tinted and stained glass window fills the broad and tall arched window in the rear wall behind the main staircase's mid-level landing.
