= Almer Township, Michigan =

Almer Charter Township, Michigan
- Charter township
- Location within the state of Michigan
- Coordinates: 43°31′53″N 83°24′4″W
- Country: United States
- State: Michigan
- County: Tuscola

Area
  - Total: 34.6 sq mi (89.7 km^{2})
  - Land: 34.6 sq mi (89.7 km^{2})
  - Water: 0 sq mi (0.0 km^{2})
- Elevation: 712 ft (217 m)

Population (2020)
  - Total: 1,965
  - Density: 56.7/sq mi (21.9/km^{2})
- Time zone: UTC-5 (Eastern (EST))
  - Summer (DST): UTC-4 (EDT)
- ZIP codes: 48723 (Caro), 48701 (Akron)
- FIPS code: 26-01620
- GNIS feature ID: 1625828
- Website: almertownship.org

Almer Charter Township is a charter township of Tuscola County in the U.S. state of Michigan. The population was 1,965 at the 2020 census. It is the only charter township in the Upper Thumb region of Michigan, and is the only charter township in Michigan to have a population less than the 2,000 resident population requirement set by the Charter Township Act of 1947. Because of this, it is the least populated Charter Township in Michigan.

== Communities ==
- The city of Caro, which is also the county seat of Tuscola County, is to the south, mostly surrounded by Indianfields Township, although the city has also incorporated some land from southern Almer Charter Township. Caro was a village until becoming a city in 2009. The Caro post office, with ZIP code 48723, also serves nearly all of Almer Charter Township.
- The village of Akron is to the west, and the Akron post office, with ZIP code 48701, also serves a small area in northwest Almer Charter Township.

== Geography ==
According to the United States Census Bureau, the township has a total area of 34.6 square miles (90 km^{2}), of which 34.6 square miles (90 km^{2}) is land and 0.04 square miles (0.10 km^{2}) (0.06%) is water.

== Demographics ==
As of the census of 2000, there were 3,023 people, 1,112 households, and 806 families residing in the township. The population density was 87.3 inhabitants per square mile (33.7/km^{2}). There were 1,197 housing units at an average density of 34.6 per square mile (13.4/km^{2}). The racial makeup of the township was 96.96% White, 0.20% African American, 0.56% Native American, 0.46% Asian, 0.69% from other races, and 1.12% from two or more races. Hispanic or Latino of any race were 2.65% of the population.

There were 1,112 households, out of which 33.5% had children under the age of 18 living with them, 59.7% were married couples living together, 9.9% had a female householder with no husband present, and 27.5% were non-families. 24.1% of all households were made up of individuals, and 10.8% had someone living alone who was 65 years of age or older. The average household size was 2.54 and the average family size was 2.97.

In the township the population was spread out, with 24.6% under the age of 18, 7.1% from 18 to 24, 25.2% from 25 to 44, 23.8% from 45 to 64, and 19.2% who were 65 years of age or older. The median age was 41 years. For every 100 females, there were 93.9 males. For every 100 females age 18 and over, there were 88.2 males.

The median income for a household in the township was $39,491, and the median income for a family was $49,878. Males had a median income of $36,140 versus $31,111 for females. The per capita income for the township was $19,464. About 3.0% of families and 6.9% of the population were below the poverty line, including 5.7% of those under age 18 and none of those age 65 or over.
