= WCTP =

- Gagetown, Michigan; United States
- Broadcast area
- Frequency: 88.5 MHz
- Branding: Christian Radio 88.5

Programming
- Format: Christian contemporary
- Affiliations: Smile FM

Ownership
- Owner: Smile FM

History
- First air date: April 2006
- Former call signs: WPEE (12/15/05-12/28/06)
- Call sign meaning: Christian Theme Park

Technical information
- Licensing authority: FCC
- Facility ID: 90608
- Class: A
- ERP: 6,000 watts
- HAAT: 100 meters (328 feet)
- Transmitter coordinates: 43°45′36″N 83°05′45″W

Links
- Public license information: Public file; LMS
- Website: https://smile.fm/

WCTP (88.5 FM, "Smile FM") is a radio station broadcasting a Christian contemporary music format. Licensed to Gagetown, Michigan, it first began broadcasting in 2006 under the WPEE call sign.

The station was assigned the WCTP call sign by the Federal Communications Commission on December 28, 2006.

== Sources ==
- Michiguide.com - WCTP History
