= Tuscola County, Michigan =

County in Michigan, United States

- County
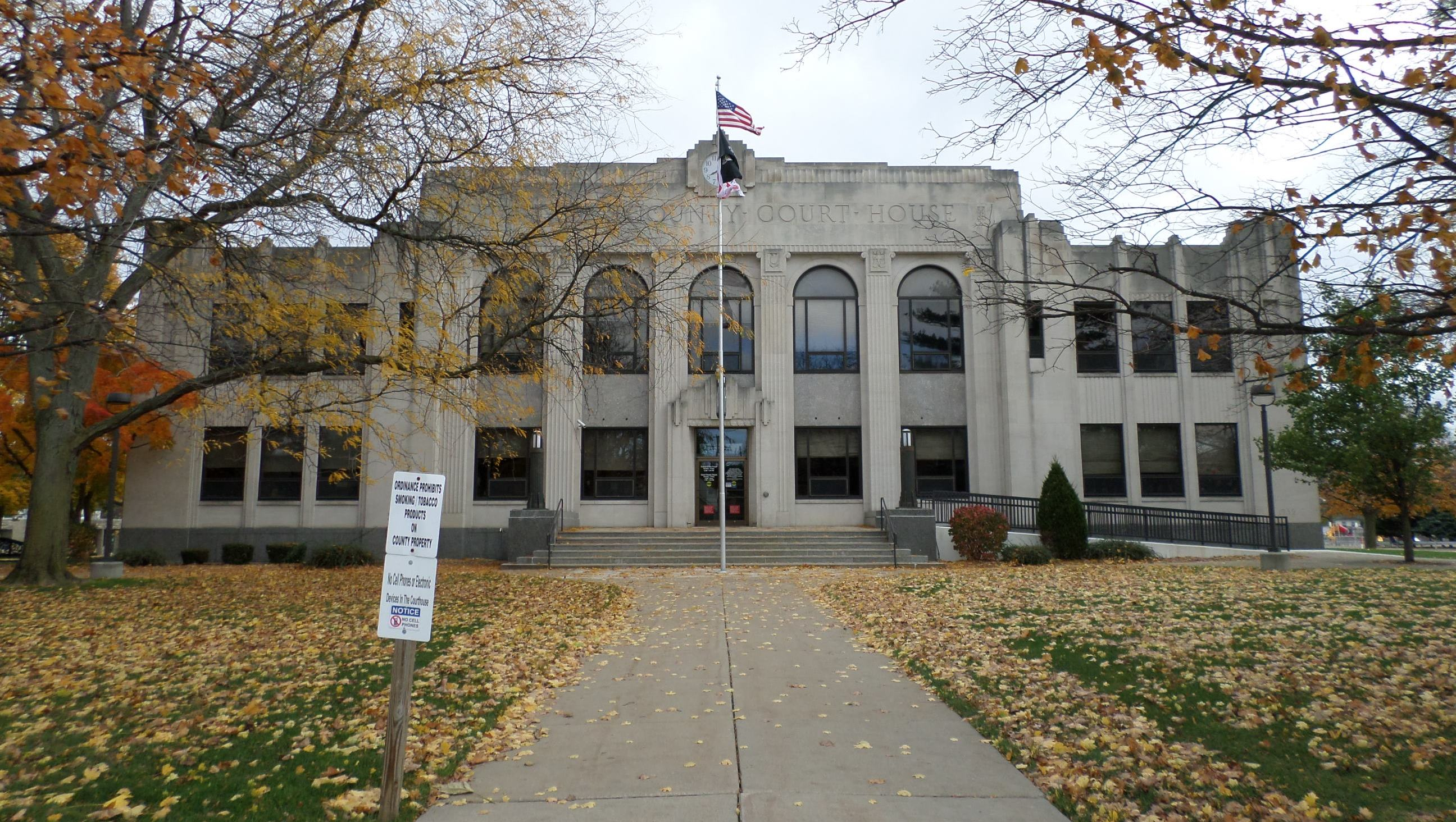
- Tuscola County Courthouse in Caro

- Location within the U.S. state of Michigan
- Coordinates: 43°28′N 83°27′W
- Country: United States
- State: Michigan
- Founded: April 1, 1840 organized March 2, 1850
- Seat: Caro
- Largest city: Caro

Area
  - Total: 914 sq mi (2,370 km^{2})
  - Land: 803 sq mi (2,080 km^{2})
  - Water: 111 sq mi (290 km^{2}) 12%

Population (2020)
  - Total: 53,323
  - Estimate (2025): 52,680 ▼
  - Density: 65.7/sq mi (25.4/km^{2})
- Time zone: UTC−5 (Eastern)
  - Summer (DST): UTC−4 (EDT)
- Congressional districts: 8th, 9th
- Website: www.tuscolacounty.org

Tuscola County (/ˈtʌs.koʊlə/ TUSS-koh-lə) is a county in the Thumb region of the U.S. state of Michigan. As of the 2020 census, the population was 53,323. The county seat is Caro. The county was created by Michigan Law on April 1, 1840, from land in Sanilac County and attached to Saginaw County for administrative purposes. The Michigan Legislature passed an act on March 2, 1850, that empowered the county residents to organize governmental functions. Tuscola County is one of five counties in the Thumb area. Like the rest of the Thumb, Tuscola County enjoys seasonal tourism from cities like Flint, Detroit and Saginaw.

== History ==
The name Tuscola was a neologism created by Henry Schoolcraft and had an aboriginal root. That source likely was the native Ojibwe name "desakamigaa" that means the flat level ground or simply the flat country. For an ending, Mr. Schoolcraft then used a form of the Latin word "colo" that means to cultivate, till, or farm or a land that is cultivated. For the suffix, the related Latin word "colonia" from which we get today the word colony means a farm estate. Tuscola then means the flat cultivated land. Henry Schoolcraft once wrote that Tuscola was derived from Native words and meant level lands. A similar word to desakamigaa is the Ojibwe word "desinaagan" that is translated as dinner plate. Shell in their language is "ess". The Ojibwe often used a shell or bark from a tree for a dish. The Ojibwe prefixes "desi-" and "tessa" are used to form their words for flat objects such as a shelf, platform, bench, or plate.

The Thumb of Michigan, which also includes Huron and Sanilac Counties, was originally called by Iroquois speaking people "Skenchioe" in the 17th century, which may be related to the Onondaga word "uschwuntschios" meaning a champaign or large extended plain. In the early 18th century, the French called the Thumb of Michigan "Le Pays Plat" that means The Flat Country. The French word "pays" means country while "plat" means flat. The English in the later 18th Century also called the land back from the shoreline around the Thumb of Michigan the Flat Country. The Thumb of Michigan forms a tableland with knolls or hillocks located in the central part of the Thumb along the Cass River. The county seat of Tuscola is Caro that is located north of the Cass River along one of these large knolls. The land around Caro particularly to the west, north, and northeast is widely farmed and cultivated. The township in which Caro lies was named Indianfields because it was a place of many early Native American gardens.

At the Treaty of Saginaw of 1819, the native leader who represented the Cass River and the Tuscola area was Chief Otusson. Otusson's Reservation was located where today lies Frankenmuth, MI. Otusson's Reservation along with a large amount of the surrounding land was sold by the Treaty of 1837.

== Geography ==
According to the U.S. Census Bureau, the county has a total area of 914 square miles (2,370 km^{2}), of which 803 square miles (2,080 km^{2}) is land and 111 square miles (290 km^{2}) (12%) is water.

=== Adjacent counties ===
- Huron County (north)
- Sanilac County (east)
- Saginaw County (west)
- Lapeer County (southeast)
- Genesee County (southwest)
- Bay County (west)

=== Major highways ===
- M-15, runs north and south
- M-24, runs north and south
- M-25, runs north and south
- M-46, runs east and west
- M-81, runs east and west
- M-138, runs east and west

=== Airport ===
- Tuscola Area Airport

== Demographics ==
Historical population
Census	Pop.	Note	%±
1850	291		—
1860	4,886		1,579.0%
1870	13,714		180.7%
1880	25,738		87.7%
1890	32,508		26.3%
1900	25,890		−20.4%
1910	34,913		34.9%
1920	33,320		−4.6%
1930	32,934		−1.2%
1940	35,694		8.4%
1950	38,258		7.2%
1960	43,305		13.2%
1970	48,603		12.2%
1980	56,961		17.2%
1990	55,498		−2.6%
2000	58,266		5.0%
2010	55,729		−4.4%
2020	53,323		−4.3%
2025 (est.)	52,680	▼	−1.2%
U.S. Decennial Census; 1790-1960 1900-1990; 1990-2000 2010-2020

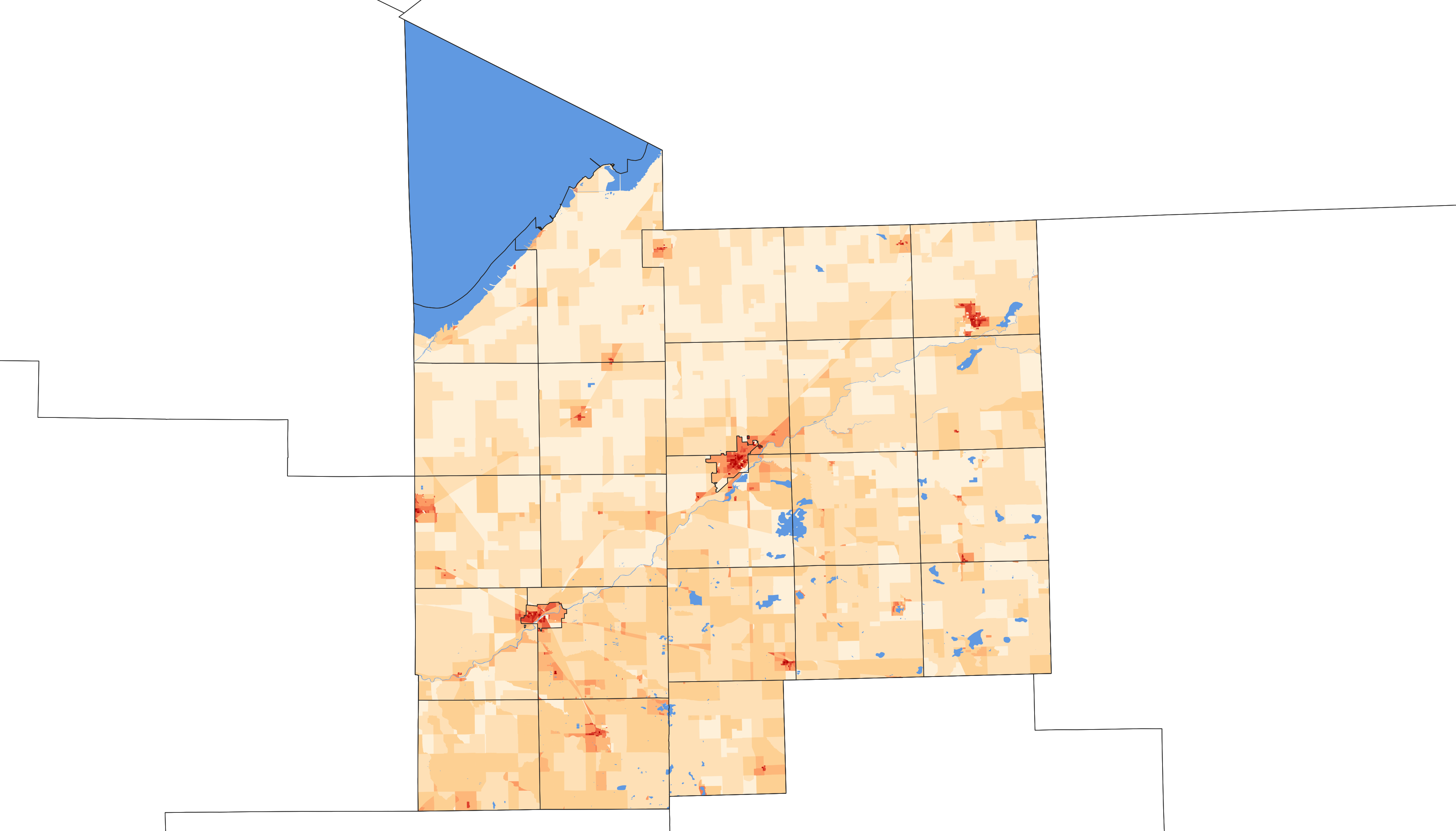
2020 population density of Tuscola County MI by census block

=== Racial and ethnic composition ===
Tuscola County, Michigan – Racial and ethnic composition Note: the US Census treats Hispanic/Latino as an ethnic category. This table excludes Latinos from the racial categories and assigns them to a separate category. Hispanics/Latinos may be of any race.
Race / Ethnicity (NH = Non-Hispanic)	Pop 1980	Pop 1990	Pop 2000	Pop 2010	Pop 2020	% 1980	% 1990	% 2000	% 2010	% 2020
White alone (NH)	55,275	53,344	55,200	52,547	48,611	97.04%	96.12%	94.74%	94.29%	91.16%
Black or African American alone (NH)	320	469	613	621	402	0.56%	0.85%	1.05%	1.11%	0.75%
Native American or Alaska Native alone (NH)	184	319	322	233	174	0.32%	0.57%	0.55%	0.42%	0.33%
Asian alone (NH)	116	197	175	155	155	0.20%	0.35%	0.30%	0.28%	0.29%
Native Hawaiian or Pacific Islander alone (NH)	x	x	10	15	12	x	x	0.02%	0.03%	0.02%
Other race alone (NH)	60	19	24	33	132	0.11%	0.03%	0.04%	0.06%	0.25%
Mixed race or Multiracial (NH)	x	x	580	554	2,029	x	x	1.00%	0.99%	3.81%
Hispanic or Latino (any race)	1,006	1,150	1,342	1,571	1,808	1.77%	2.07%	2.30%	2.82%	3.39%
Total	56,961	55,498	58,266	55,729	53,323	100.00%	100.00%	100.00%	100.00%	100.00%

=== 2020 census ===
As of the 2020 census, the county had a population of 53,323. The median age was 44.5 years. 21.3% of residents were under the age of 18 and 21.0% of residents were 65 years of age or older. For every 100 females there were 100.9 males, and for every 100 females age 18 and over there were 98.9 males age 18 and over.

The racial makeup of the county was 92.7% White, 0.8% Black or African American, 0.4% American Indian and Alaska Native, 0.3% Asian, <0.1% Native Hawaiian and Pacific Islander, 0.8% from some other race, and 5.0% from two or more races. Hispanic or Latino residents of any race comprised 3.4% of the population.

10.1% of residents lived in urban areas, while 89.9% lived in rural areas.

There were 21,635 households in the county, of which 26.6% had children under the age of 18 living in them. Of all households, 51.1% were married-couple households, 18.7% were households with a male householder and no spouse or partner present, and 22.7% were households with a female householder and no spouse or partner present. About 27.3% of all households were made up of individuals and 13.2% had someone living alone who was 65 years of age or older.

There were 23,933 housing units, of which 9.6% were vacant. Among occupied housing units, 82.1% were owner-occupied and 17.9% were renter-occupied. The homeowner vacancy rate was 1.3% and the rental vacancy rate was 7.1%.

=== 2010 census ===
The 2010 United States census indicates Tuscola County had a 2010 population of 55,729. This is a decrease of -2,537 people from the 2000 United States census. Overall, the county had a -4.4% growth rate during this ten-year period. In 2010 there were 21,590 households and 15,423 families in the county. The population density was 69.4 per square mile (26.8 per square kilometer). There were 24,451 housing units at an average density of 30.4 per square mile (11.7 per square kilometer). 96.1% of the population were White, 1.1% Black or African American, 0.5% Native American, 0.3% Asian, 0.7% of some other race and 1.2% of two or more races. 2.8% were Hispanic or Latino (of any race). 32.3% were of German, 9.0% English, 8.4% Polish, 8.0% Irish, 7.8% American and 6.2% French, French Canadian or Cajun ancestry.

There were 21,590 households, out of which 30.9% had children under the age of 18 living with them, 56.5% were husband and wife families, 9.9% had a female householder with no husband present, 28.6% were non-families, and 24.0% were made up of individuals. The average household size was 2.52 and the average family size was 2.97.

In the county, the population was spread out, with 23.5% under age of 18, 7.9% from 18 to 24, 23.0% from 25 to 44, 29.8% from 45 to 64, and 15.8% who were 65 years of age or older. The median age was 42 years. For every 100 females there were 100.6 males. For every 100 females age 18 and over, there were 98.6 males.

=== 2010 American Community Survey ===
The 2010 American Community Survey 3-year estimate indicates the median income for a household in the county was $40,839 and the median income for a family was $49,274. Males had a median income of $28,288 versus $15,314 for females. The per capita income for the county was $19,470. About 1.7% of families and 17.2% of the population were below the poverty line, including 23.0% of those under the age 18 and 11.0% of those age 65 or over.

=== Religion ===
The Roman Catholic Diocese of Saginaw is the controlling regional body for the Catholic Church.

== Government ==
Tuscola County has been strongly Republican for most of its history, only failing to back a Republican candidate four times in presidential elections from 1884 to the present day, and in only one of those elections did the Democratic nominee win a majority of the county's vote.

United States presidential election results for Tuscola County, Michigan
Year	Republican		Democratic		Third party(ies)	
Year	No.	%	No.	%	No.	%
1884	2,914	49.73%	2,624	44.78%	322	5.49%
1888	3,888	52.78%	3,112	42.24%	367	4.98%
1892	3,201	54.47%	2,067	35.17%	609	10.36%
1896	4,277	53.10%	3,564	44.25%	214	2.66%
1900	4,726	61.26%	2,648	34.32%	341	4.42%
1904	4,992	72.15%	1,518	21.94%	409	5.91%
1908	4,430	68.84%	1,563	24.29%	442	6.87%
1912	2,559	34.65%	1,255	16.99%	3,571	48.35%
1916	4,461	63.49%	2,329	33.15%	236	3.36%
1920	7,282	82.67%	1,269	14.41%	258	2.93%
1924	7,490	80.37%	1,076	11.55%	753	8.08%
1928	8,188	84.39%	1,464	15.09%	51	0.53%
1932	6,110	53.75%	5,077	44.66%	180	1.58%
1936	6,188	56.07%	3,743	33.91%	1,106	10.02%
1940	10,146	75.45%	3,257	24.22%	45	0.33%
1944	9,789	76.55%	2,938	22.98%	60	0.47%
1948	8,125	73.59%	2,676	24.24%	240	2.17%
1952	11,788	77.97%	3,251	21.50%	80	0.53%
1956	12,052	75.63%	3,864	24.25%	19	0.12%
1960	11,931	68.93%	5,357	30.95%	20	0.12%
1964	7,509	44.42%	9,374	55.45%	22	0.13%
1968	10,205	61.44%	4,698	28.28%	1,707	10.28%
1972	12,198	67.96%	5,449	30.36%	302	1.68%
1976	12,059	59.86%	7,932	39.38%	153	0.76%
1980	13,306	59.12%	7,632	33.91%	1,567	6.96%
1984	14,698	70.01%	6,212	29.59%	83	0.40%
1988	12,093	56.90%	9,060	42.63%	101	0.48%
1992	8,636	35.01%	9,138	37.05%	6,892	27.94%
1996	9,154	40.43%	10,314	45.55%	3,173	14.01%
2000	13,213	53.60%	10,845	43.99%	594	2.41%
2004	15,389	54.31%	12,631	44.57%	318	1.12%
2008	13,740	49.33%	13,503	48.48%	611	2.19%
2012	14,240	54.54%	11,425	43.76%	445	1.70%
2016	17,102	65.96%	7,429	28.65%	1,397	5.39%
2020	20,297	68.85%	8,712	29.55%	470	1.59%
2024	21,764	70.85%	8,562	27.87%	391	1.27%

United States Senate election results for Tuscola County, Michigan1
Year	Republican		Democratic		Third party(ies)	
Year	No.	%	No.	%	No.	%
2024	20,503	68.03%	8,754	29.04%	883	2.93%

Michigan Gubernatorial election results for Tuscola County
Year	Republican		Democratic		Third party(ies)	
Year	No.	%	No.	%	No.	%
2022	15,078	62.81%	8,418	35.06%	511	2.13%

The county government operates the jail, maintains rural roads, operates the major local courts, keeps files of deeds and mortgages, maintains vital records, administers public health regulations, and participates with the state in the provision of welfare and other social services. The county board of commissioners controls the budget but has only limited authority to make laws or ordinances. In Michigan, most local government functions — police and fire, building and zoning, tax assessment, street maintenance, etc. — are the responsibility of individual cities and townships.

=== Elected officials ===
- Prosecuting Attorney: Mark E. Reene
- Sheriff: Ryan Robinson
- County Clerk: Jodi Fetting
- County Treasurer: Ashley Bennett
- Register of Deeds: Marianne Brandt
- Drain Commissioner: Robert Mantey
- Circuit Court Judge: Hon. Amy Gierhart
- Probate Court Judge: Hon. Nancy Thane
- District Court Judge: Hon. Jason Bitzer
- County Commissioner District 1: Tom Young (R)
- County Commissioner District 2: Thomas Bardwell (R)
- County Commissioner District 3: Kim Vaughan (R)
- County Commissioner District 4: Bill Lutz (R)
- County Commissioner District 5: Matthew Koch (R)

(information as of December 14, 2023)

== Communities ==
=== Cities ===
- Caro (county seat)
- Vassar

=== Villages ===
- Akron
- Cass City
- Fairgrove
- Gagetown
- Kingston
- Mayville
- Millington
- Reese
- Unionville

=== Census-designated place ===
- Fostoria

=== Other unincorporated communities ===
- Bay Park
- Bach
- Bradleyville
- Colling
- Colwood
- Dayton
- Deford
- Denmark Junction
- East Dayton
- Ellington
- Elmwood
- Gilford
- Juniata
- Karrs Corner
- Oakhurst
- Quanicassee
- Richville
- Silverwood
- Thomas
- Tuscola
- Wahjamega
- Watrousville
- Wisner
- Wilmot

=== Charter township ===
- Almer Charter Township

=== General law townships ===
- Akron Township
- Arbela Township
- Columbia Township
- Dayton Township
- Denmark Township
- Elkland Township
- Ellington Township
- Elmwood Township
- Fairgrove Township
- Fremont Township
- Gilford Township
- Indianfields Township
- Juniata Township
- Kingston Township
- Koylton Township
- Millington Township
- Novesta Township
- Tuscola Township
- Vassar Township
- Watertown Township
- Wells Township
- Wisner Township

== See also ==
- List of Michigan State Historic Sites in Tuscola County
- National Register of Historic Places listings in Tuscola County, Michigan
