= Hotel Montague =

- U.S. National Register of Historic Places
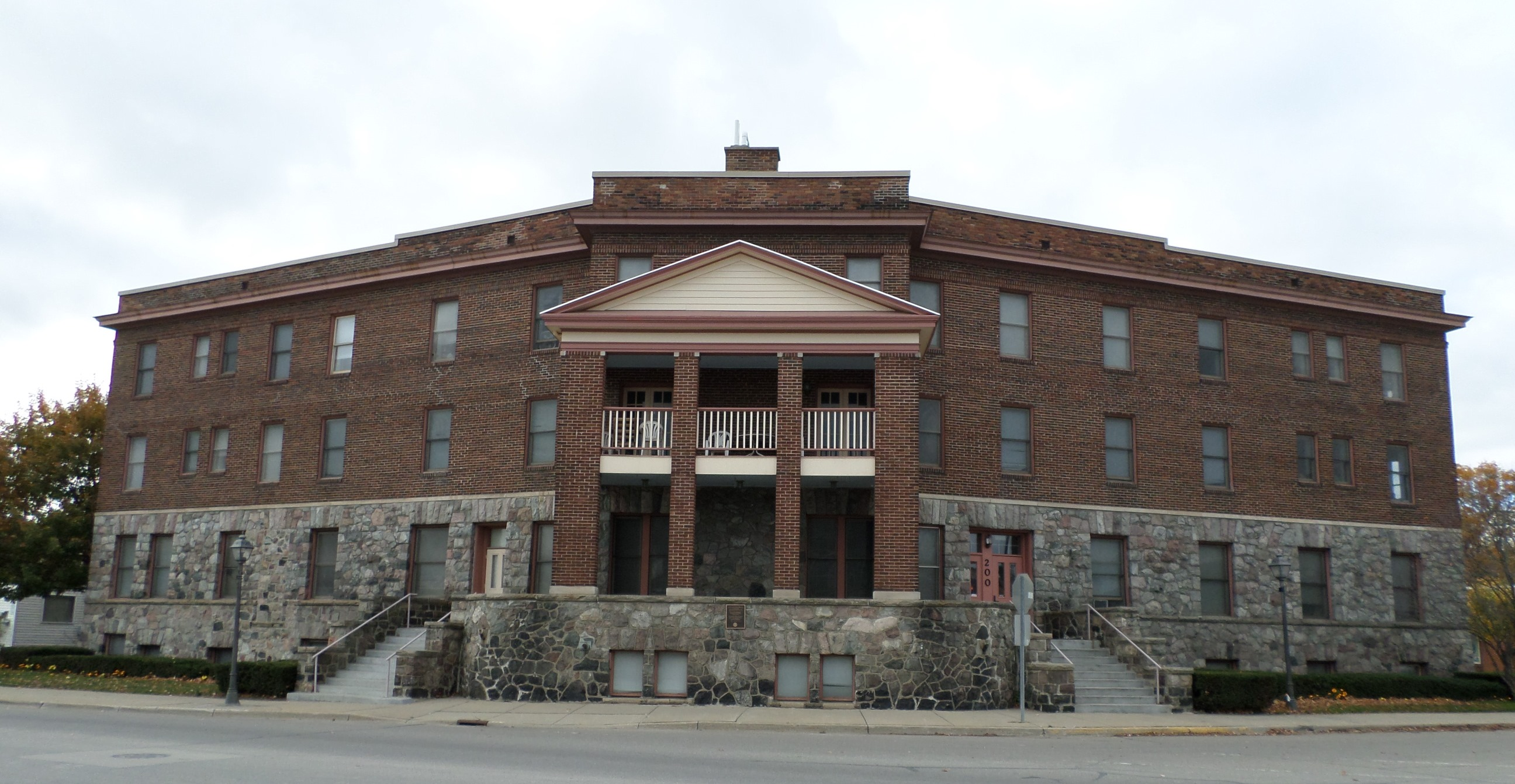

- Location within Michigan Location within the United States
- Interactive map showing the location of Hotel Montague
- Location: 200 S. State St., Caro, Michigan
- Coordinates: 43°29′19″N 83°23′51″W
- Area: less than one acre
- Built: 1924
- Architect: Cowles & Mutscheller
- Architectural style: Classical Revival
- NRHP reference No.: 91000875
- Added to NRHP: July 9, 1991

The Hotel Montague is a former hotel located at 200 South State Street in Caro, Michigan. It was listed on the National Register of Historic Places in 1991. It now houses the Montague Place Apartments.

== History ==
Charles Montague was born near London, Ontario in 1847 and moved to Caro in 1863. After a stint in the Union Army, he joined his uncle's mercantile business. He bought out his uncle in 1867, and continued in business with William E. Sherman. Montague and Sherman constructed a commercial block, located at this site in Caro, in 1869. Over the next few years, Montague continued to construct commercial enterprises in Caro. He also opened a bank in Caro in 1875, and a sugar beet factory in 1899. At this point, Montague realized the need for a first class hotel in Caro. In 1900, Montague's earliest business block was demolished and work began on the first Hotel Montague. The hotel opened in 1902. Montague continued in various business interests for the next 20 years, and even planned to construct an opera house adjacent to the hotel. However, in 1921, he was overcome by illness and died January 10.

On November 21, 1923 the first Hotel Montague burned down. The Caro Board of Commerce, realizing the need for a hotel in town, began planning to construct a replacement structure almost immediately. By late December they were reviewing plans from Saginaw architects Cowles & Mutscheller, and by March 1924 had gathered funds to build the hotel. Construction began in May, and was completed by December 1924.

The hotel continued to operate as a hotel through the Great Depression and beyond. The hotel changed owners in 1962, but by the late 1960s, much of the hotel business had moved to newer motels on the outskirts of the community. It was again sold in 1978, and in 1984, a fire closed the hotel for good. The building remained vacant through 1991.

== Description ==
The Hotel Montague is a 3 1/2-story L-shaped brick and cut fieldstone building sited on a corner lot. The main facade is Classical Revival in form, and includes a pedimented, double-deck, brick-pier portico at the join of the legs of the L. Concrete stairs at both ends of the portico provide access to the main entrance. The lower 1 1/2 story is clad with fieldstones, a remnant of the original 1902 hotel. The upper two stories are covered with a brown face brick. The flat roof is hidden behind a parapet. Two small additions from the 1950s are in the rear. All windows are double hung wood, with a single light.
