= Fostoria, Michigan =

- Census-designated place (CDP) & unincorporated community
- Location within Michigan Location within the United States
- Coordinates: 43°15′12″N 83°22′19″W
- Country: United States
- State: Michigan
- County: Sanilac

Area
  - Total: 4.01 sq mi (10.38 km^{2})
  - Land: 4.01 sq mi (10.38 km^{2})
  - Water: 0 sq mi (0.00 km^{2})
- Elevation: 853 ft (260 m)

Population (2020)
  - Total: 664
  - Density: 165.7/sq mi (63.98/km^{2})
- Time zone: UTC-5 (Eastern (EST))
  - Summer (DST): UTC-4 (EDT)
- ZIP code: 48435
- Area code: 989
- GNIS feature ID: 626321

Fostoria is an unincorporated community and census-designated place in Watertown Township, Tuscola County, Michigan, United States. As of the 2020 census, Fostoria had a population of 664. Fostoria has a post office with ZIP code 48435.

== Geography ==
According to the U.S. Census Bureau, the community has an area of 3.861 square miles (10.00 km^{2}), of which 3.860 square miles (10.00 km^{2}) is land and 0.001 square miles (0.0026 km^{2}) is water.

== Demographics ==
Historical population
Census	Pop.	Note	%±
2020	664		—
U.S. Decennial Census

== History ==
Michigan Governor Henry H. Crapo once owned most of the pine forestland in the area and had a line of the Pere Marquette Railway run through Fostoria. The community was named in 1881 for Crapo's foreman, Thomas Foster. Its first post office operated from July 1882 until May 1883.
