= Tuscola Township, Michigan =

- Township
- Location within the state of Michigan
- Coordinates: 43°20′53″N 83°38′13″W
- Country: United States
- State: Michigan
- County: Tuscola

Area
  - Total: 33.1 sq mi (85.6 km^{2})
  - Land: 33.0 sq mi (85.4 km^{2})
  - Water: 0.077 sq mi (0.2 km^{2})
- Elevation: 682 ft (208 m)

Population (2020)
  - Total: 1,978
  - Density: 60.0/sq mi (23.2/km^{2})
- Time zone: UTC-5 (Eastern (EST))
  - Summer (DST): UTC-4 (EDT)
- ZIP code: 48768 (Vassar); 48734 (Frankenmuth)
- Area code: 989
- FIPS code: 26-80940
- GNIS feature ID: 1627180
- Website: https://tuscolatownship.org/

Tuscola Township (/ˈtʌs.koʊlə/ tuss-KOH-lə) is a civil township of Tuscola County in the U.S. state of Michigan. The population was 1,978 at the 2020 census.

The city of Vassar is to the northeast and incorporates some land from the survey township that forms the basis for the present civil township.

== History ==
The township was established in 1840 as a township of Saginaw County and encompassed all of Tuscola County, which had been created by an Act of the Michigan Legislature on April 1, 1840, from land in Sanilac County and attached for administrative purposes to Saginaw County.

== Communities ==
- Tuscola is an unincorporated community in the Township North and South of the Cass River in section 28 at Bray Road 43°19′35″N 83°39′26″W. A post off named "Worth" was established on March 6, 1848, with Ebenezer Davis as the first postmaster. The name changed to Tuscola on January 8, 1875. The community was platted in 1850 and the post office operated until January 5, 1962. The plat for the Village of Tuscola south of the River was filed in 1861. The Muro Matheson Addition to the Village plat was filed in May 1868. The city of Vassar post office with ZIP code 48768 provides P.O. Box service.

== Geography ==
According to the United States Census Bureau, the township has a total area of 33.0 square miles (85 km^{2}), of which 33.0 square miles (85 km^{2}) is land and 0.1 square miles (0.26 km^{2}) (0.27%) is water.

== Demographics ==
As of the census of 2000, there were 2,152 people, 793 households, and 623 families residing in the township. The population density was 65.3 inhabitants per square mile (25.2/km^{2}). There were 826 housing units at an average density of 25.1 per square mile (9.7/km^{2}). The racial makeup of the township was 98.37% White, 0.42% Native American, 0.33% Asian, 0.65% from other races, and 0.23% from two or more races. Hispanic or Latino of any race were 1.21% of the population.

There were 793 households, out of which 34.4% had children under the age of 18 living with them, 69.6% were married couples living together, 6.2% had a female householder with no husband present, and 21.4% were non-families. 18.3% of all households were made up of individuals, and 9.5% had someone living alone who was 65 years of age or older. The average household size was 2.71 and the average family size was 3.09.

In the township the population was spread out, with 27.3% under the age of 18, 6.7% from 18 to 24, 27.7% from 25 to 44, 25.7% from 45 to 64, and 12.6% who were 65 years of age or older. The median age was 37 years. For every 100 females, there were 97.6 males. For every 100 females age 18 and over, there were 95.7 males.

The median income for a household in the township was $49,130, and the median income for a family was $53,750. Males had a median income of $40,568 versus $24,231 for females. The per capita income for the township was $18,986. About 3.3% of families and 4.4% of the population were below the poverty line, including 3.6% of those under age 18 and 5.7% of those age 65 or over.
