= Gagetown, Michigan =

- Village
- St. Agatha Catholic Church

- Location of Gagetown, Michigan
- Coordinates: 43°39′27″N 83°14′38″W
- Country: United States
- State: Michigan
- County: Tuscola

Area
  - Total: 0.98 sq mi (2.55 km^{2})
  - Land: 0.98 sq mi (2.54 km^{2})
  - Water: 0.0039 sq mi (0.01 km^{2})
- Elevation: 751 ft (229 m)

Population (2020)
  - Total: 321
  - Density: 327/sq mi (126.3/km^{2})
- Time zone: UTC-5 (Eastern (EST))
  - Summer (DST): UTC-4 (EDT)
- ZIP code: 48735
- Area code: 989
- FIPS code: 26-31180
- GNIS feature ID: 0626592

Gagetown is a village in Tuscola County in the U.S. state of Michigan. As of the 2020 census, Gagetown had a population of 321. It is located in the northeastern corner of Elmwood Township.

Gagetown is northeast of the Saginaw metropolitan area as well as the city of Caro.

== History ==
Gagetown began around a mill founded by Joseph Gage in 1869. The village was platted in 1871 and incorporated in 1887.

== Geography ==
According to the United States Census Bureau, the village has a total area of 0.98 square miles (2.54 km^{2}), all land.

== Demographics ==
Historical population
| Census | Pop. | Note | %± |
|---|---|---|---|
| 1890 | 237 | | — |
| 1900 | 329 | | 38.8% |
| 1910 | 358 | | 8.8% |
| 1920 | 440 | | 22.9% |
| 1930 | 368 | | −16.4% |
| 1940 | 354 | | −3.8% |
| 1950 | 401 | | 13.3% |
| 1960 | 376 | | −6.2% |
| 1970 | 408 | | 8.5% |
| 1980 | 428 | | 4.9% |
| 1990 | 337 | | −21.3% |
| 2000 | 389 | | 15.4% |
| 2010 | 388 | | −0.3% |
| 2020 | 321 | | −17.3% |
U.S. Decennial Census

=== 2010 census ===
As of the census of 2010, there were 388 people, 150 households, and 107 families residing in the village. The population density was 395.9 inhabitants per square mile (152.9/km^{2}). There were 171 housing units at an average density of 174.5 per square mile (67.4/km^{2}). The racial makeup of the village was 97.7% White, 1.0% from other races, and 1.3% from two or more races. Hispanic or Latino of any race were 3.1% of the population.

There were 150 households, of which 33.3% had children under the age of 18 living with them, 52.7% were married couples living together, 12.7% had a female householder with no husband present, 6.0% had a male householder with no wife present, and 28.7% were non-families. 26.0% of all households were made up of individuals, and 11.3% had someone living alone who was 65 years of age or older. The average household size was 2.59 and the average family size was 3.06.

The median age in the village was 38.2 years. 27.1% of residents were under the age of 18; 10.5% were between the ages of 18 and 24; 22.6% were from 25 to 44; 24.2% were from 45 to 64; and 15.5% were 65 years of age or older. The gender makeup of the village was 50.8% male and 49.2% female.

=== 2000 census ===
As of the census of 2000, there were 389 people, 154 households, and 103 families residing in the village. The population density was 406.3 inhabitants per square mile (156.9/km^{2}). There were 167 housing units at an average density of 174.4 per square mile (67.3/km^{2}). The racial makeup of the village was 91.52% White, 1.03% Native American, 0.77% Asian, 2.83% from other races, and 3.86% from two or more races. Hispanic or Latino of any race were 7.20% of the population.

There were 154 households, out of which 32.5% had children under the age of 18 living with them, 47.4% were married couples living together, 13.6% had a female householder with no husband present, and 32.5% were non-families. 26.6% of all households were made up of individuals, and 15.6% had someone living alone who was 65 years of age or older. The average household size was 2.52 and the average family size was 3.00.

In the village, the population was spread out, with 29.0% under the age of 18, 5.9% from 18 to 24, 28.5% from 25 to 44, 20.3% from 45 to 64, and 16.2% who were 65 years of age or older. The median age was 36 years. For every 100 females, there were 102.6 males. For every 100 females age 18 and over, there were 95.7 males.

The median income for a household in the village was $28,750, and the median income for a family was $34,444. Males had a median income of $26,354 versus $20,500 for females. The per capita income for the village was $14,165. About 11.7% of families and 14.9% of the population were below the poverty line, including 16.3% of those under age 18 and 6.6% of those age 65 or over.
