= Fremont Township, Tuscola County, Michigan =

Fremont Township, Michigan
- Township
- Location within the state of Michigan
- Coordinates: 43°21′7″N 83°23′22″W
- Country: United States
- State: Michigan
- County: Tuscola

Area
  - Total: 36.1 sq mi (93.6 km^{2})
  - Land: 35.9 sq mi (93.1 km^{2})
  - Water: 0.19 sq mi (0.5 km^{2})
- Elevation: 761 ft (232 m)

Population (2020)
  - Total: 3,167
  - Density: 88.1/sq mi (34.0/km^{2})
- Time zone: UTC-5 (Eastern (EST))
  - Summer (DST): UTC-4 (EDT)
- FIPS code: 26-30760
- GNIS feature ID: 1626320
- Website: www.fremonttownship.org

Fremont Township is a civil township of Tuscola County in the U.S. state of Michigan. The population was 3,167 at the 2020 census.

== Communities ==
- Mayville is a village on M-24 in the southeast corner of the township.
- Juniata or Juniata Station was a Port Huron and Northwestern Railway station on the western edge of section 30 in the township, on the boundary with Vassar Township at 43°20′59″N 83°27′44″W. A hotel known as Kelley's Tavern, which opened there in 1864, was the first house open for public lodging. This is not to be confused with Juniata Township, which is a few miles away to the north and west in next range of townships.

== Geography ==
According to the United States Census Bureau, the township has a total area of 36.1 square miles (93 km^{2}), of which 35.9 square miles (93 km^{2}) is land and 0.2 square miles (0.52 km^{2}) (0.53%) is water.

== Demographics ==
As of the census of 2000, there were 3,559 people, 1,266 households, and 965 families residing in the township. The population density was 99.0 inhabitants per square mile (38.2/km^{2}). There were 1,332 housing units at an average density of 37.1 per square mile (14.3/km^{2}). The racial makeup of the township was 97.50% White, 0.17% African American, 0.51% Native American, 0.11% Asian, 0.06% from other races, and 1.66% from two or more races. Hispanic or Latino of any race were 1.43% of the population.

There were 1,266 households, out of which 37.2% had children under the age of 18 living with them, 61.7% were married couples living together, 9.6% had a female householder with no husband present, and 23.7% were non-families. 18.7% of all households were made up of individuals, and 7.2% had someone living alone who was 65 years of age or older. The average household size was 2.78 and the average family size was 3.17.

In the township the population was spread out, with 28.0% under the age of 18, 9.4% from 18 to 24, 27.5% from 25 to 44, 23.9% from 45 to 64, and 11.2% who were 65 years of age or older. The median age was 35 years. For every 100 females, there were 97.8 males. For every 100 females age 18 and over, there were 96.9 males.

The median income for a household in the township was $38,909, and the median income for a family was $46,285. Males had a median income of $37,857 versus $22,554 for females. The per capita income for the township was $16,355. About 6.7% of families and 9.7% of the population were below the poverty line, including 10.8% of those under age 18 and 2.2% of those age 65 or over.

== History ==
A post office called Northgrove opened at North Grove and Mertz Roads (now M-24) and operated from February 21, 1899 to March 15, 1901.
