= Vassar Township, Michigan =

- Township
- Location within the state of Michigan
- Coordinates: 43°20′50″N 83°31′53″W
- Country: United States
- State: Michigan
- County: Tuscola

Area
  - Total: 35.3 sq mi (91.5 km^{2})
  - Land: 35.2 sq mi (91.2 km^{2})
  - Water: 0.12 sq mi (0.3 km^{2})
- Elevation: 696 ft (212 m)

Population (2020)
  - Total: 3,890
  - Density: 110/sq mi (42.7/km^{2})
- Time zone: UTC-5 (Eastern (EST))
  - Summer (DST): UTC-4 (EDT)
- ZIP codes: 48768-48769
- Area code: 989
- FIPS code: 26-81860
- GNIS feature ID: 1627191
- Website: https://www.vassartownship.org

Vassar Township is a civil township of Tuscola County in the U.S. state of Michigan. The population was 3,890 at the 2020 census. The city of Vassar is located on the western edge of the township, but is administratively autonomous and separate from the township.

== Geography ==
According to the United States Census Bureau, the township has a total area of 35.3 square miles (91 km^{2}), of which 35.2 square miles (91 km^{2}) is land and 0.1 square miles (0.26 km^{2}) (0.34%) is water.

== Demographics ==
As of the census of 2000, there were 4,356 people, 1,532 households, and 1,216 families residing in the township. The population density was 123.7 inhabitants per square mile (47.8/km^{2}). There were 1,617 housing units at an average density of 45.9 per square mile (17.7/km^{2}). The racial makeup of the township was 96.76% White, 0.46% African American, 0.51% Native American, 0.44% Asian, 0.44% from other races, and 1.40% from two or more races. Hispanic or Latino of any race were 2.23% of the population.

There were 1,532 households, out of which 40.8% had children under the age of 18 living with them, 64.5% were married couples living together, 9.7% had a female householder with no husband present, and 20.6% were non-families. 16.2% of all households were made up of individuals, and 5.5% had someone living alone who was 65 years of age or older. The average household size was 2.84 and the average family size was 3.15.

In the township the population was spread out, with 29.4% under the age of 18, 9.0% from 18 to 24, 30.6% from 25 to 44, 22.9% from 45 to 64, and 8.1% who were 65 years of age or older. The median age was 34 years. For every 100 females, there were 101.5 males. For every 100 females age 18 and over, there were 99.7 males.

The median income for a household in the township was $42,152, and the median income for a family was $45,529. Males had a median income of $35,607 versus $21,674 for females. The per capita income for the township was $18,697. About 2.8% of families and 4.6% of the population were below the poverty line, including 6.5% of those under age 18 and none of those age 65 or over.
