= Indianfields Township, Michigan =

- Township
- Location within the state of Michigan
- Coordinates: 43°28′40″N 83°24′14″W
- Country: United States
- State: Michigan
- County: Tuscola

Area
  - Total: 35.2 sq mi (91.2 km^{2})
  - Land: 34.7 sq mi (90.0 km^{2})
  - Water: 0.50 sq mi (1.3 km^{2})
- Elevation: 696 ft (212 m)

Population (2020)
  - Total: 2,492
  - Density: 71.7/sq mi (27.7/km^{2})
- Time zone: UTC-5 (Eastern (EST))
  - Summer (DST): UTC-4 (EDT)
- ZIP codes: 48723 (Caro), 48768 (Vassar)
- FIPS code: 26-40440
- GNIS feature ID: 1626512
- Website: https://www.indianfieldstownship.org/

Indianfields Township is a civil township of Tuscola County in the U.S. state of Michigan. The population of the township was 2,492 at the 2020 census. The township is immediately adjacent to the city of Caro, which is north of the township.

== Communities ==
- The city of Caro, which is also the county seat of Tuscola County, is surrounded by Indianfields Township on its west, south and east, however, is administratively autonomous. Caro was a village (and thus, part of the Township) until becoming a city in 2009. The Caro post office, with ZIP code 48723, also serves nearly all of Indianfields Township.
- Wahjamega is an unincorporated community in the township at 43°27′20″N 83°26′23″W. A lumberman named William A. Heartt first visited here in 1852 and moved here the following year. He became the first postmaster on August 8, 1857, and platted the settlement. The name is an acronym from the initials of three partners who operated a sawmill here: William A Heartt, James A. Montgomery, and Edgar George Avery. The post office closed on May 31, 1905, but was restored from December 2, 1914, until August 31, 1940. The settlement was absorbed when the Michigan Farm Colony for Epileptics, now the Caro Center, was founded here.

== Geography ==
According to the United States Census Bureau, the township has a total area of 35.2 square miles (91 km^{2}), of which 34.7 square miles (90 km^{2}) is land and 0.5 square miles (1.3 km^{2}) (1.36%) is water.

== Demographics ==
As of the census of 2000, there were 6,392 people, 2,505 households, and 1,600 families residing in the township. The population density was 184.0 inhabitants per square mile (71.0/km^{2}). There were 2,707 housing units at an average density of 77.9 per square mile (30.1/km^{2}). The racial makeup of the township was 92.77% White, 2.83% African American, 0.92% Native American, 0.55% Asian, 0.03% Pacific Islander, 1.67% from other races, and 1.22% from two or more races. Hispanic or Latino of any race were 4.04% of the population.

There were 2,505 households, out of which 29.6% had children under the age of 18 living with them, 47.7% were married couples living together, 11.9% had a female householder with no husband present, and 36.1% were non-families. 31.1% of all households were made up of individuals, and 13.5% had someone living alone who was 65 years of age or older. The average household size was 2.39 and the average family size was 2.96.

In the township the population was spread out, with 23.3% under the age of 18, 9.1% from 18 to 24, 29.2% from 25 to 44, 23.9% from 45 to 64, and 14.5% who were 65 years of age or older. The median age was 37 years. For every 100 females, there were 93.6 males. For every 100 females age 18 and over, there were 94.0 males.

The median income for a household in the township was $33,155, and the median income for a family was $37,790. Males had a median income of $35,905 versus $25,169 for females. The per capita income for the township was $16,511. About 6.8% of families and 12.0% of the population were below the poverty line, including 12.6% of those under age 18 and 9.9% of those age 65 or over.
