= Wells Township, Tuscola County, Michigan =

Wells Township, Michigan
- Township
- Location within the state of Michigan
- Coordinates: 43°27′22″N 83°17′38″W
- Country: United States
- State: Michigan
- County: Tuscola

Area
  - Total: 35.4 sq mi (91.7 km^{2})
  - Land: 35.4 sq mi (91.7 km^{2})
  - Water: 0 sq mi (0.0 km^{2})
- Elevation: 748 ft (228 m)

Population (2020)
  - Total: 1,590
  - Density: 44.9/sq mi (17.3/km^{2})
- Time zone: UTC-5 (Eastern (EST))
  - Summer (DST): UTC-4 (EDT)
- FIPS code: 26-85280
- GNIS feature ID: 1627243
- Website: https://wellstwp.org/

Wells Township is a civil township of Tuscola County in the U.S. state of Michigan. The population was 1,590 at the 2020 census.

== Communities ==
- There are no incorporated municipalities in the township.
- Dayton, or Daytona Branch, is an unincorporated community is located at Hurds Corner and James Roads 43°27′42″N 83°17′15″W.
- East Dayton is an unincorporated community located on the boundary between Wells Township and the adjacent Dayton Township at m-46/Sanilac Road and Hurds Corner Road 43°24′39″N 83°17′07″W.

Much of the land in the township is part of the Deford State Game Preserve and is drained by tributaries of the Cass River.

== Geography ==
According to the United States Census Bureau, the township has a total area of 35.4 square miles (91.7 km^{2}), of which 35.4 square miles (91.7 km^{2}) is land and 0.03% is water.

== Demographics ==
As of the census of 2000, there were 1,946 people, 621 households, and 485 families residing in the township. The population density was 54.9 inhabitants per square mile (21.2/km^{2}). There were 679 housing units at an average density of 19.2 per square mile (7.4/km^{2}). The racial makeup of the township was 95.73% White, 1.34% African American, 0.92% Native American, 0.15% Asian, 0.05% Pacific Islander, 0.41% from other races, and 1.39% from two or more races. Hispanic or Latino of any race were 1.34% of the population.

There were 621 households, out of which 36.7% had children under the age of 18 living with them, 64.3% were married couples living together, 8.4% had a female householder with no husband present, and 21.9% were non-families. 18.7% of all households were made up of individuals, and 7.2% had someone living alone who was 65 years of age or older. The average household size was 2.79 and the average family size was 3.11.

In the township the population was spread out, with 24.6% under the age of 18, 7.9% from 18 to 24, 32.1% from 25 to 44, 25.5% from 45 to 64, and 9.9% who were 65 years of age or older. The median age was 38 years. For every 100 females, there were 106.8 males. For every 100 females age 18 and over, there were 108.1 males.

The median income for a household in the township was $43,200, and the median income for a family was $47,500. Males had a median income of $34,732 versus $26,836 for females. The per capita income for the township was $18,986. About 6.5% of families and 9.8% of the population were below the poverty line, including 12.5% of those under age 18 and 5.2% of those age 65 or over.
