= Millington Township, Michigan =

- Township
- Location within the state of Michigan
- Coordinates: 43°16′44″N 83°31′18″W
- Country: United States
- State: Michigan
- County: Tuscola

Area
  - Total: 36.0 sq mi (93.3 km^{2})
  - Land: 35.8 sq mi (92.6 km^{2})
  - Water: 0.23 sq mi (0.6 km^{2})
- Elevation: 761 ft (232 m)

Population (2020)
  - Total: 4,246
  - Density: 119/sq mi (45.9/km^{2})
- Time zone: UTC-5 (Eastern (EST))
  - Summer (DST): UTC-4 (EDT)
- ZIP code: 48746
- Area code: 989
- FIPS code: 26-54240
- GNIS feature ID: 1626744
- Website: https://millingtontownship.com/

Millington Township is a civil township of Tuscola County in the U.S. state of Michigan. The population was 4,246 as of the 2020 census. The Village of Millington is located within the township.

== Geography ==
According to the United States Census Bureau, the township has a total area of 36.0 square miles (93 km^{2}), of which 35.8 square miles (93 km^{2}) is land and 0.2 square miles (0.52 km^{2}) (0.69%) is water.

== Demographics ==
As of the census of 2000, there were 4,459 people, 1,609 households, and 1,275 families residing in the township. The population density was 124.7 inhabitants per square mile (48.1/km^{2}). There were 1,713 housing units at an average density of 47.9 per square mile (18.5/km^{2}). The racial makeup of the township was 97.91% White, 0.25% African American, 0.38% Native American, 0.11% Asian, 0.25% from other races, and 1.10% from two or more races. Hispanic or Latino of any race were 1.12% of the population.

There were 1,609 households, out of which 35.5% had children under the age of 18 living with them, 66.2% were married couples living together, 9.6% had a female householder with no husband present, and 20.7% were non-families. 17.4% of all households were made up of individuals, and 7.8% had someone living alone who was 65 years of age or older. The average household size was 2.75 and the average family size was 3.11.

In the township the population was spread out, with 26.4% under the age of 18, 8.8% from 18 to 24, 27.9% from 25 to 44, 25.5% from 45 to 64, and 11.4% who were 65 years of age or older. The median age was 37 years. For every 100 females, there were 94.7 males. For every 100 females age 18 and over, there were 93.5 males.

The median income for a household in the township was $48,365, and the median income for a family was $55,379. Males had a median income of $40,268 versus $24,158 for females. The per capita income for the township was $19,698. About 4.2% of families and 6.1% of the population were below the poverty line, including 9.1% of those under age 18 and 7.0% of those age 65 or over.

== History ==
The first recorded settler of Millington Township was E.E. Brainerd in December 1850. At this time, Millington Township was known as Podunk. Its name was later changed to Lanesville in 1860, and Millington in 1872.
