= Columbia Township, Tuscola County, Michigan =

Columbia Township, Michigan
- Township
- Location within the state of Michigan
- Coordinates: 43°37′58″N 83°25′39″W
- Country: United States
- State: Michigan
- County: Tuscola

Area
  - Total: 36.1 sq mi (93.4 km^{2})
  - Land: 36.1 sq mi (93.4 km^{2})
  - Water: 0 sq mi (0.0 km^{2})
- Elevation: 643 ft (196 m)

Population (2020)
  - Total: 1,229
  - Density: 34.1/sq mi (13.2/km^{2})
- Time zone: UTC-5 (Eastern (EST))
  - Summer (DST): UTC-4 (EDT)
- FIPS code: 26-17420
- GNIS feature ID: 1626120
- Website: https://sites.google.com/columbiatwplibrary.com/township

Columbia Township is a civil township of Tuscola County in the U.S. state of Michigan. The population was 1,229 at the 2020 census.

== History ==
Columbia Township was established in 1855.

== Communities ==
- Colling is an unincorporated community in the township west of Colling Road on Dickerson Road at 43°36′40″N 83°24′33″W. It was named for William Colling, a Canadian who purchased 180 acres (0.73 km^{2}) of land here in 1880. It was given a station on the Michigan Central Railroad and a post office operated from January 30, 1903, until October 31, 1936.
- Columbia Corners was an unincorporated community started in 1854. It had a post office from 1879 until 1903.
- Colwood is an unincorporated community on the boundary between Columbia Township and Elmwood Township at Dickerson and Colwood Roads at 43°36′42″N 83°21′08″W. Named as a portmanteau formed from the township and the principal product, lumber, a post office operated here from February 27, 1884, until May 31, 1905.
- Unionville is an incorporated village located in the northwestern corner of the township.

== Geography ==
According to the United States Census Bureau, the township has a total area of 36.0 square miles (93 km^{2}), all land.

== Demographics ==
As of the census of 2000, there were 1,419 people, 528 households, and 399 families residing in the township. The population density was 39.4 inhabitants per square mile (15.2/km^{2}). There were 558 housing units at an average density of 15.5 per square mile (6.0/km^{2}). The racial makeup of the township was 97.18% White, 0.28% Native American, 0.49% Asian, 0.07% Pacific Islander, 0.78% from other races, and 1.20% from two or more races. Hispanic or Latino of any race were 2.47% of the population.

There were 528 households, out of which 34.1% had children under the age of 18 living with them, 64.0% were married couples living together, 8.5% had a female householder with no husband present, and 24.4% were non-families. 20.8% of all households were made up of individuals, and 9.8% had someone living alone who was 65 years of age or older. The average household size was 2.66 and the average family size was 3.11.

In the township the population was spread out, with 26.8% under the age of 18, 8.8% from 18 to 24, 26.8% from 25 to 44, 22.2% from 45 to 64, and 15.4% who were 65 years of age or older. The median age was 36 years. For every 100 females, there were 99.0 males. For every 100 females age 18 and over, there were 94.9 males.

The median income for a household in the township was $39,375, and the median income for a family was $43,750. Males had a median income of $32,850 versus $22,404 for females. The per capita income for the township was $17,026. About 8.0% of families and 10.5% of the population were below the poverty line, including 19.5% of those under age 18 and 5.0% of those age 65 or over.
