= Dayton Township, Tuscola County, Michigan =

Dayton Township, Michigan
- Township
- Location within the state of Michigan
- Coordinates: 43°22′29″N 83°16′27″W
- Country: United States
- State: Michigan
- County: Tuscola

Area
  - Total: 36.1 sq mi (93.6 km^{2})
  - Land: 35.8 sq mi (92.8 km^{2})
  - Water: 0.35 sq mi (0.9 km^{2})
- Elevation: 860 ft (262 m)

Population (2020)
  - Total: 1,920
  - Density: 53.6/sq mi (20.7/km^{2})
- Time zone: UTC-5 (Eastern (EST))
  - Summer (DST): UTC-4 (EDT)
- FIPS code: 26-19980
- GNIS feature ID: 1626163
- Website: https://www.daytontwptuscola.com/

Dayton Township is a civil township of Tuscola County in the U.S. state of Michigan. The population was 1,920 at the 2020 census.

== History ==
Dayton Township was established in 1857. It was named for William L. Dayton.

== Communities ==
There are no incorporated municipalities in the township.

- East Dayton is an unincorporated community located on the boundary between Dayton Township and the adjacent Wells Township at Hurds Corner and M-46 (Sanilac Road) 43°24′39″N 83°17′07″W. It was established in 1856.
- Silverwood is an unincorporated community in the northeast corner of the township at 43°19′24″N 83°14′53″W on the boundary with Rich Township in Lapeer County to the north at Marlette, Clifford and Silverwood roads.

== Geography ==
The southern portion of the township is drained by tributaries of the Flint River while the northern part is drained by tributaries of the Cass River.

According to the United States Census Bureau, the township has a total area of 36.2 square miles (94 km^{2}), of which 35.8 square miles (93 km^{2}) is land and 0.3 square miles (0.78 km^{2}) (0.94%) is water.

== Demographics ==
As of the census of 2000, there were 1,869 people, 679 households, and 530 families residing in the township. The population density was 52.2 inhabitants per square mile (20.2/km^{2}). There were 1,006 housing units at an average density of 28.1 per square mile (10.8/km^{2}). The racial makeup of the township was 94.86% White, 2.41% African American, 0.16% Native American, 0.21% Asian, 0.05% Pacific Islander, 0.21% from other races, and 2.09% from two or more races. Hispanic or Latino of any race were 1.71% of the population.

There were 679 households, out of which 33.6% had children under the age of 18 living with them, 67.0% were married couples living together, 6.8% had a female householder with no husband present, and 21.8% were non-families. 18.6% of all households were made up of individuals, and 7.5% had someone living alone who was 65 years of age or older. The average household size was 2.73 and the average family size was 3.04.

In the township the population was spread out, with 27.1% under the age of 18, 7.4% from 18 to 24, 25.9% from 25 to 44, 26.5% from 45 to 64, and 13.1% who were 65 years of age or older. The median age was 38 years. For every 100 females, there were 103.6 males. For every 100 females age 18 and over, there were 102.4 males.

The median income for a household in the township was $42,000, and the median income for a family was $46,696. Males had a median income of $39,519 versus $21,950 for females. The per capita income for the township was $18,890. About 6.9% of families and 10.5% of the population were below the poverty line, including 10.5% of those under age 18 and 11.0% of those age 65 or over.
