= Mayville, Michigan =

- Village
- Location of Mayville, Michigan
- Coordinates: 43°20′10″N 83°21′3″W
- Country: United States
- State: Michigan
- County: Tuscola

Area
  - Total: 1.10 sq mi (2.84 km^{2})
  - Land: 1.08 sq mi (2.79 km^{2})
  - Water: 0.019 sq mi (0.05 km^{2})
- Elevation: 912 ft (278 m)

Population (2020)
  - Total: 922
  - Density: 856.0/sq mi (330.49/km^{2})
- Time zone: UTC-5 (Eastern (EST))
  - Summer (DST): UTC-4 (EDT)
- ZIP code: 48744
- Area code: 989
- FIPS code: 26-52540
- GNIS feature ID: 0631783
- Website: villageofmayville.org

Mayville is a village in Tuscola County, in the U.S. state of Michigan. The population was 922 at the 2020 census. The village is within Fremont Township along the boundary with Dayton Township.

== Geography ==
According to the United States Census Bureau, the village has a total area of 1.15 square miles (2.98 km^{2}), of which 1.13 square miles (2.93 km^{2}) is land and 0.02 square miles (0.05 km^{2}) is water. Mayville is home to one public school system, grades K-12, the 'Mayville Wildcats' include students from the nearby towns of Silverwood and Fostoria. The village was founded in 1865 by Dexter Choat.

== Demographics ==
Historical population
Census	Pop.	Note	%±
1880	248		—
1890	728		193.5%
1900	825		13.3%
1910	687		−16.7%
1920	652		−5.1%
1930	654		0.3%
1940	736		12.5%
1950	888		20.7%
1960	896		0.9%
1970	872		−2.7%
1980	958		9.9%
1990	1,010		5.4%
2000	1,055		4.5%
2010	950		−10.0%
2020	922		−2.9%
U.S. Decennial Census

In 2010 Mayville was awarded an energy improvement grant by the U.S. Department of Energy. A total of 43 grants were distributed under the American Recovery and Reinvestment Act to improve the nation's energy security.

=== 2010 census ===
As of the census of 2010, there were 950 people, 369 households, and 235 families living in the village. The population density was 840.7 inhabitants per square mile (324.6/km^{2}). There were 432 housing units at an average density of 382.3 per square mile (147.6/km^{2}). The racial makeup of the village was 96.1% White, 0.5% African American, 0.2% Native American, 0.2% Asian, 0.5% from other races, and 2.4% from two or more races. Hispanic or Latino of any race were 2.5% of the population.

There were 369 households, of which 33.6% had children under the age of 18 living with them, 43.9% were married couples living together, 13.3% had a female householder with no husband present, 6.5% had a male householder with no wife present, and 36.3% were non-families. 32.0% of all households were made up of individuals, and 12.7% had someone living alone who was 65 years of age or older. The average household size was 2.43 and the average family size was 3.05.

The median age in the village was 41.1 years. 25.4% of residents were under the age of 18; 7.4% were between the ages of 18 and 24; 21.9% were from 25 to 44; 25% were from 45 to 64; and 20.1% were 65 years of age or older. The gender makeup of the village was 47.4% male and 52.6% female.

=== 2000 census ===
As of the census of 2000, there were 1,055 people, 402 households, and 281 families living in the village. The population density was 1,028.9 inhabitants per square mile (397.3/km^{2}). There were 424 housing units at an average density of 413.5 per square mile (159.7/km^{2}). The racial makeup of the village was 97.73% White, 0.47% African American, 0.19% Asian, and 1.61% from two or more races. Hispanic or Latino of any race were 1.14% of the population.

There were 402 households, out of which 35.1% had children under the age of 18 living with them, 52.2% were married couples living together, 13.7% had a female householder with no husband present, and 29.9% were non-families. 25.4% of all households were made up of individuals, and 10.0% had someone living alone who was 65 years of age or older. The average household size was 2.62 and the average family size was 3.16.

In the village, the population was spread out, with 28.2% under the age of 18, 12.4% from 18 to 24, 26.5% from 25 to 44, 20.1% from 45 to 64, and 12.7% who were 65 years of age or older. The median age was 32 years. For every 100 females, there were 93.6 males. For every 100 females age 18 and over, there were 90.7 males.

The median income for a household in the village was $33,375, and the median income for a family was $37,917. Males had a median income of $34,286 versus $21,111 for females. The per capita income for the village was $15,281. About 10.1% of families and 11.3% of the population were below the poverty line, including 12.6% of those under age 18 and 6.9% of those age 65 or over.

== Climate ==
This climatic region has large seasonal temperature differences, with warm to hot (and often humid) summers and cold (sometimes severely cold) winters. According to the Köppen Climate Classification system, Mayville has a humid continental climate, abbreviated "Dfb" on climate maps.

Climate data for Mayville, Michigan
Month	Jan	Feb	Mar	Apr	May	Jun	Jul	Aug	Sep	Oct	Nov	Dec	Year
Mean daily maximum °C (°F)	−1 (30)	0 (32)	6 (43)	14 (58)	21 (70)	27 (80)	29 (84)	27 (81)	23 (74)	17 (62)	8 (47)	1 (34)	14 (58)
Mean daily minimum °C (°F)	−10 (14)	−9 (16)	−4 (24)	1 (34)	7 (44)	12 (53)	14 (58)	13 (56)	9 (49)	4 (39)	−2 (29)	−7 (20)	2 (36)
Average precipitation mm (inches)	43 (1.7)	33 (1.3)	51 (2)	71 (2.8)	71 (2.8)	84 (3.3)	79 (3.1)	76 (3)	89 (3.5)	66 (2.6)	64 (2.5)	48 (1.9)	770 (30.5)
Source: Weatherbase
