= Elmwood Township, Tuscola County, Michigan =

Elmwood Township, Michigan
- Township
- Location within the state of Michigan
- Coordinates: 43°38′4″N 83°17′2″W
- Country: United States
- State: Michigan
- County: Tuscola
- Settled: 1855
- Organized: 1860

Area
  - Total: 35.5 sq mi (92.0 km^{2})
  - Land: 35.5 sq mi (92.0 km^{2})
  - Water: 0 sq mi (0.0 km^{2})
- Elevation: 686 ft (209 m)

Population (2020)
  - Total: 1,060
  - Density: 29.8/sq mi (11.5/km^{2})
- Time zone: UTC-5 (Eastern (EST))
  - Summer (DST): UTC-4 (EDT)
- FIPS code: 26-25720
- GNIS feature ID: 1626236
- Website: https://www.elmwoodtownshipmi.org/

Elmwood Township is a civil township of Tuscola County in the U.S. state of Michigan. The population was 1,060 at the 2020 census.

Elijah White was the first permanent white settler in the township in 1855. The township was organized with the name Waterloo in 1860 and renamed Elmwood by the state legislature in 1863.

== Communities ==
- The village of Gagetown is located in the northeastern corner of the township.
- Colwood is an unincorporated community located on the boundary between Elmwood and Columbia Townships at Dickerson and Colwood Roads at 43°36′42″N 83°21′08″W.
- Elmwood is an unincorporated community on the boundary between Elmwood and Ellington Townships at Elmwood Road and M-81/E Caro Road. A post office opened on May 31, 1862, and closed June 1, 1868. The office was reestablished on December 18, 1871, and closed June 23, 1873. It was reestablished on February 25, 1874, and closed May 31, 1905.
- Elm Rock was a post office in this township from 1879 until 1883.

== Geography ==
According to the United States Census Bureau, the township has a total area of 35.5 square miles (92 km^{2}), all land.

== Demographics ==
As of the census of 2000, there were 1,213 people, 470 households, and 343 families residing in the township. The population density was 34.1 inhabitants per square mile (13.2/km^{2}). There were 515 housing units at an average density of 14.5 per square mile (5.6/km^{2}). The racial makeup of the township was 94.56% White, 0.25% African American, 0.82% Native American, 0.25% Asian, 1.73% from other races, and 2.39% from two or more races. Hispanic or Latino of any race were 4.12% of the population.

There were 470 households, out of which 32.3% had children under the age of 18 living with them, 60.0% were married couples living together, 8.7% had a female householder with no husband present, and 27.0% were non-families. 23.6% of all households were made up of individuals, and 10.9% had someone living alone who was 65 years of age or older. The average household size was 2.57 and the average family size was 3.03.

In the township the population was spread out, with 26.0% under the age of 18, 6.7% from 18 to 24, 28.1% from 25 to 44, 24.7% from 45 to 64, and 14.5% who were 65 years of age or older. The median age was 39 years. For every 100 females, there were 107.7 males. For every 100 females age 18 and over, there were 105.0 males.

The median income for a household in the township was $37,583, and the median income for a family was $46,346. Males had a median income of $31,181 versus $24,028 for females. The per capita income for the township was $18,317. About 7.5% of families and 10.8% of the population were below the poverty line, including 13.4% of those under age 18 and 8.0% of those age 65 or over.
