= Cass River (Michigan) =

River in Michigan, United States

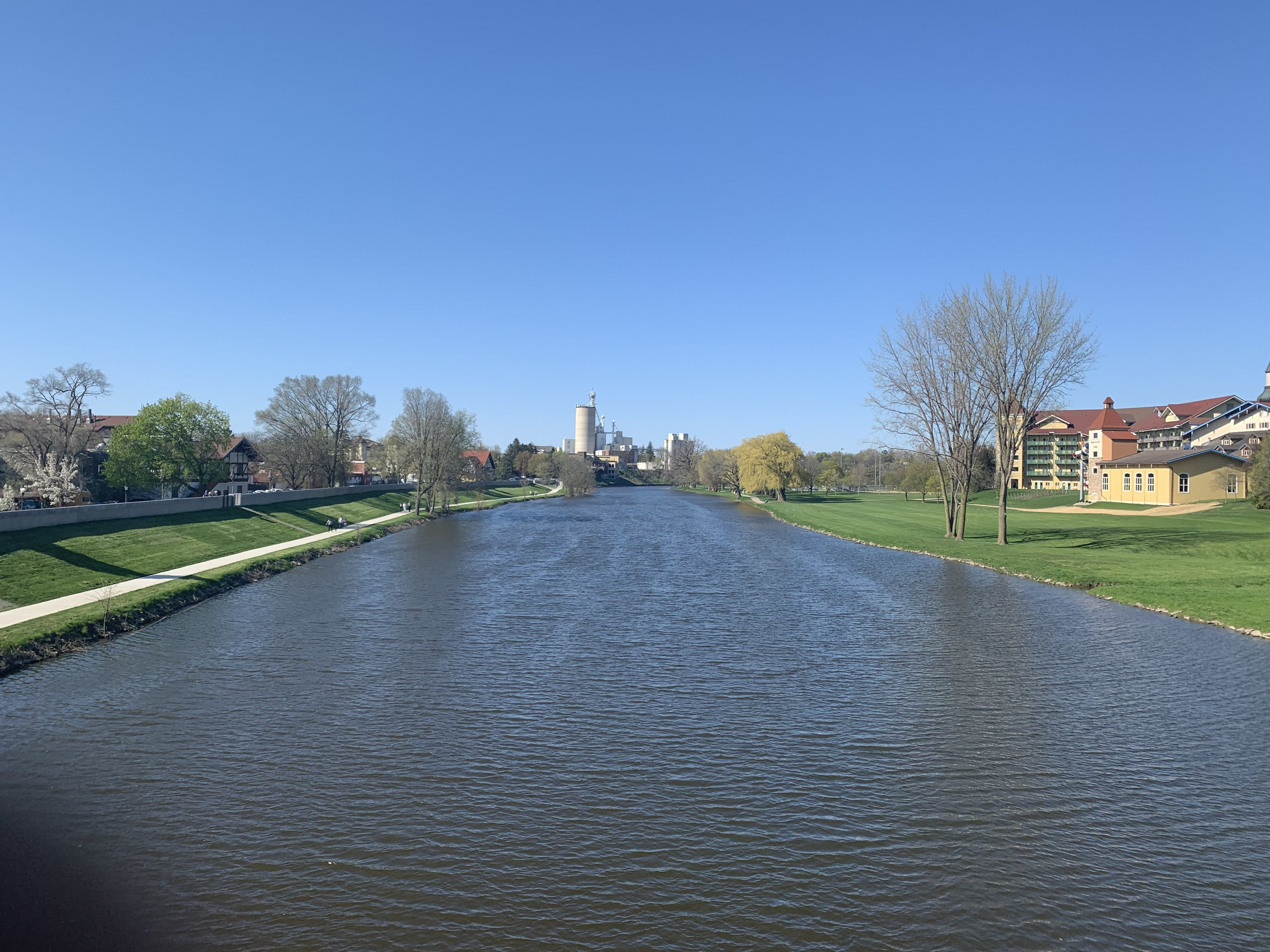
- The Cass River running through Frankenmuth, 2022

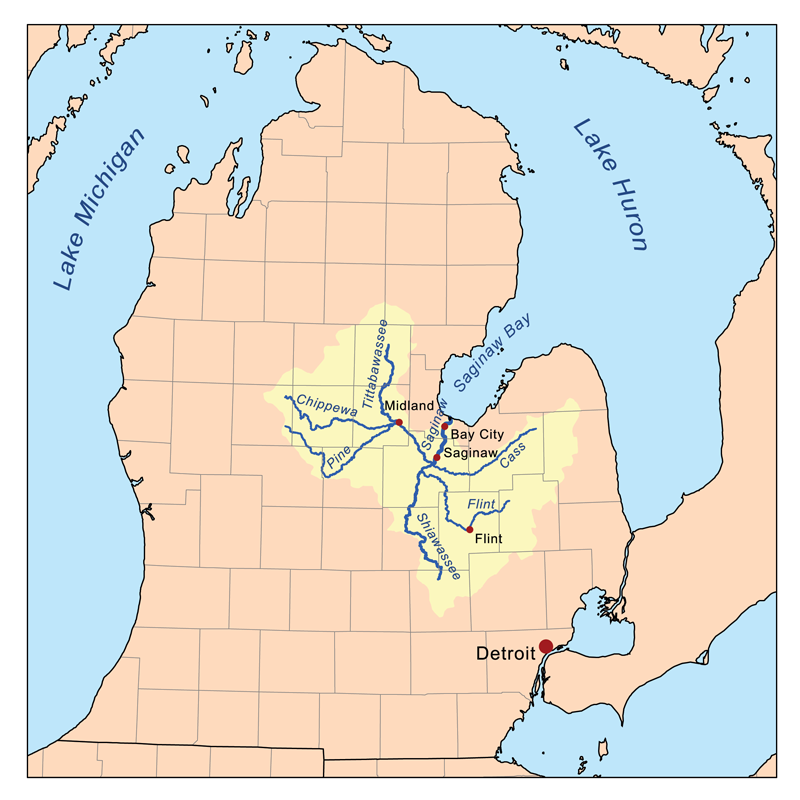
- Map of the Saginaw River watershed showing the Cass River as one of its major tributaries

Physical characteristics
- Source
  - location: Sanilac County
- Mouth: Shiawassee River
  - location: Shiawassee National Wildlife Refuge
  - coordinates: 43°22′44″N 83°58′59″W
- Length: 61.5 mi (99.0 km)
- Discharge
  - location: mouth
  - average: 666.89 cu ft/s (18.884 m^{3}/s) (estimate)

Basin features
- River system: Saginaw River

The Cass River is a 61.5-mile-long (99.0 km) river in the Thumb region of the U.S. state of Michigan. It drains large portions of Sanilac and Tuscola counties and smaller portions of Genesee, Huron, Lapeer, and Saginaw counties.

It flows into the Shiawassee River in the Shiawassee National Wildlife Refuge at 43°22′42″N 83°59′04″W less than a mile from where the Shiawassee merges with the Tittabawassee River to form the Saginaw River southwest of the city of Saginaw. The Saginaw River is a tributary of Lake Huron.

The Cass River flows through or very near Bridgeport, Frankenmuth, Tuscola, Vassar, Caro, and Cass City.

The main branch of the Cass River is formed by the confluence of the North and South branches at 43°35′10″N 83°10′15″W, just south of Cass City. The Middle Branch joins the South Branch at 43°32′56″N 83°03′05″W in Evergreen Township in Sanilac County. The Middle Branch rises in Elmer Township in Sanilac County. The South Branch rises in Flynn Township, Sanilac County near the boundary with Lapeer County.

The North Branch rises in the confluence of several drains northeast of Ubly in Huron County. The headwaters of the South Fork of the North Branch are drains in the south of Paris Township in southeast Huron County. The South Fork of the North Branch is formed by the confluence of drains in Minden Township in north central Sanilac County. The South Fork flows into the North Branch at 43°39′17″N 83°01′50″W in Greenleaf Township, Michigan in Sanilac County.
