= Ellington Township, Michigan =

- Township
- Location within the state of Michigan
- Coordinates: 43°32′36″N 83°18′6″W
- Country: United States
- State: Michigan
- County: Tuscola

Area
  - Total: 35.7 sq mi (92.5 km^{2})
  - Land: 35.7 sq mi (92.5 km^{2})
  - Water: 0 sq mi (0.0 km^{2})
- Elevation: 709 ft (216 m)

Population (2020)
  - Total: 1,325
  - Density: 37.1/sq mi (14.3/km^{2})
- Time zone: UTC-5 (Eastern (EST))
  - Summer (DST): UTC-4 (EDT)
- FIPS code: 26-25380
- GNIS feature ID: 1626228
- Website: https://www.ellingtontownship.org/

Ellington Township is a civil township of Tuscola County in the U.S. state of Michigan. The population was 1,325 at the 2020 census. The area is known as the “thumb of Michigan”

== History ==
Ellington Township was established in 1855.

== Communities ==
- Ellington is an unincorporated community in the township at Dutcher Rd and M-81/E Caro Road. A post office operated from May 31, 1862, until May 31, 1905.
- Elmwood is an unincorporated community on the boundary with Elmwood Township at Elmwood Road and M-81/E Caro Road.

== Geography ==
According to the United States Census Bureau, the township has a total area of 35.7 square miles (92 km^{2}), of which 35.7 square miles (92 km^{2}) is land and 0.03% is water.

== Demographics ==
As of the census of 2000, there were 1,304 people, 480 households, and 372 families residing in the township. The population density was 36.5 inhabitants per square mile (14.1/km^{2}). There were 527 housing units at an average density of 14.8 per square mile (5.7/km^{2}). The racial makeup of the township was 97.62% White, 0.08% African American, 0.54% Native American, 0.08% Asian, 0.69% from other races, and 1.00% from two or more races. Hispanic or Latino of any race were 1.84% of the population.

There were 480 households, out of which 37.3% had children under the age of 18 living with them, 64.6% were married couples living together, 7.1% had a female householder with no husband present, and 22.3% were non-families. 17.7% of all households were made up of individuals, and 6.7% had someone living alone who was 65 years of age or older. The average household size was 2.70 and the average family size was 3.03.

In the township the population was spread out, with 26.2% under the age of 18, 8.4% from 18 to 24, 28.4% from 25 to 44, 28.1% from 45 to 64, and 8.8% who were 65 years of age or older. The median age was 37 years. For every 100 females, there were 109.3 males. For every 100 females age 18 and over, there were 106.4 males.

The median income for a household in the township was $43,750, and the median income for a family was $51,979. Males had a median income of $33,672 versus $26,250 for females. The per capita income for the township was $18,677. About 4.7% of families and 8.3% of the population were below the poverty line, including 11.0% of those under age 18 and 11.5% of those age 65 or over.
