= Ubly Community Schools =

School district in Michigan, United States

Address
- 2020 Union Street Ubly, Huron County, Michigan, 48475; United States

District information
- Motto: Innovative. Inspiration. Community.
- Grades: PreKindergarten–12
- Superintendent: Troy Reehl
- Schools: 2
- Budget: $10,340,000 2022–2023 expenditures
- NCES District ID: 2634380

Students and staff
- Students: 629 (2024–2025)
- Teachers: 41.22 (on an FTE basis) (2024–2025)
- Staff: 87.61 FTE (2024–2025)
- Student–teacher ratio: 15.26 (2024–2025)
- District mascot: Bearcats

Other information
- Website: ublyschools.org

Ubly Community Schools is a public school district in the Thumb region of Michigan. In Huron County, it serves Ubly and parts of the townships of Bingham, Paris, Sheridan, Sherman, Sigel, and Verona. In Sanilac County, it serves Minden City, Austin Township, and parts of the townships of Argyle, Delaware, Greenleaf, and Minden.

== History ==
Ubly's current school opened in fall 1936. It was paid for with a bond issue approved by the community as well as a grant from the Works Progress Administration. It was built with Bayport stone quarried in Huron County.

An elementary school section with six classrooms was dedicated on January 10, 1954. Four new classrooms opened in fall 1960. An addition to the high school, including a new gymnasium, was built in 1967. The school's largest addition was built in 1993, and increased the size of the building by 73 percent.

== Schools ==
Schools in Ubly Community Schools share a building at 2020 Union Street in Ubly. The preschool is housed in a separate building, Ubly Preschool and Latchkey, at 4454 North Washington Street in Ubly.

Schools in Ubly Community Schools district
School	Notes
Ubly Community Junior/Senior High School	Grades 6–12
Ubly Elementary	Grades K-5
