= Cass City Public Schools =

School district in Michigan, United States

Address
- 4868 Seeger Street Cass City, Tuscola County, Michigan, 48726; United States
- Coordinates: 43.61137°N 83.17485°W

District information
- Grades: PreKindergarten–12
- Superintendent: Allison Zimba
- Schools: 2
- Budget: $15,775,000 2022-2023 expenditures
- NCES District ID: 2608400

Students and staff
- Students: 877 (2024-2025)
- Teachers: 52.53 (on an FTE basis) (2024-2025)
- Staff: 138.91 FTE (2024-2025)
- Student–teacher ratio: 16.73 (2024-2025)
- Athletic conference: Big Thumb Conference
- District mascot: Red Hawks
- Colors: Maroon and White

Other information
- Website: www.casscityschools.org

Cass City Public Schools is a public school district in the Thumb of Michigan.

== Geographic Area ==
In Tuscola County, it serves Cass City, Novesta Township, and parts of the townships of Almer, Columbia, Elkland, Ellington, Elmwood, Kingston, and Wells. In Sanilac County, it serves Evergreen Township and parts of Greenleaf and Lamotte townships. In Huron County, it serves parts of Grant and Sheridan townships.

== History ==
Cass City Public Schools' first school was built in 1864.

The former Cass City High School was built in 1926, and originally housed all grades in the district. It became the district's middle school when the present high school opened. A stand-alone elementary school was built around 1949, named for Willis Campbell, a district superintendent.

Warren Holmes Company of Lansing designed the current Cass City Junior/Senior High School in 1965. It opened around January 1968.

In March 1996, a bond issue passed to build a new middle school. The middle school opened in January 1998, and the 1926 section of the former school was torn down, leaving the one-story wing to be converted to a school for kindergarten and pre-kindergarten, called the Cass City Early Childhood Center.

The middle school was closed around 2011 and the building became Cass City Elementary. Middle school students joined high school students, forming Cass City Junior/Senior High School.

== Schools ==
Schools in Cass City Public Schools district
School	Address	Notes
Cass City Jr./Sr. High School	4868 Seeger Street, Cass City	Grades 7–12. Built 1968.
Cass City Elementary	4805 Ale Street, Cass City	Grades PreK-6.
