= Deford, Michigan =

- unincorporated community
- Location within the state of Michigan
- Coordinates: 43°30′48″N 83°11′33″W
- Country: United States
- State: Michigan
- County: Tuscola
- Township: Novesta Township
- Settled: 1884
- Platted: 1885

Government
  - Type: None
- Elevation: 741 ft (226 m)
- Time zone: UTC-5 (Eastern (EST))
  - Summer (DST): UTC-4 (EDT)
- ZIP code: 48729
- Area code: 989
- FIPS code: 26-21360
- GNIS feature ID: 624510

Deford is an unincorporated community in Tuscola County in the U.S. state of Michigan, located along Bruce/Deckerville Road west of the intersection with Kingston Road (Section 32, North East quarter), north of Kingston and south of Cass City in the southeast corner of Novesta Township. The Deford Post Office with ZIP code 48729 serves the southern portion of the township as well as the northern portion of Kingston Township and areas in the northeast corner of Wells Township.

== History ==
When the Grand Trunk Western Railroad was built through Deford in 1883, the station was named Bruce after local land owner Elmer Bruce. The community was founded in 1884 by Arthur Newton and named for his friend, Mr. Deford. A post office was also established in 1884. A plat for Deford was filed on July 10, 1885.

== Climate ==
Deford's climate is much like that of Flint, approximately 30 or 40 miles to the southwest. During the winter, Deford faces heavy precipitation due to its location on the snow belt that comes through Michigan. The community is also located in a tornado prone region of the thumb area. The average amount of precipitation that falls over the community is 30.6 inches.

== Government ==
Deford has no government of its own and is governed by Novesta Township.

District	Number	Officeholder
U.S. Representative	10	Lisa McClain
State Senate	31	Kevin Daley
State Representative	84	Phil Green
County Commissioner	3	Thomas Bardwell
School District	Cass City	Multiple; see article

== Education ==
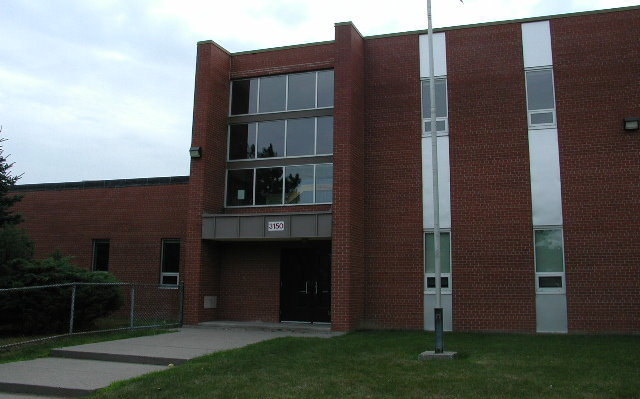
Deford-Cass City Christian Academy

Public education is provided by Cass City Public Schools. The Deford Christian Academy is a private school that had a 2007-08 year enrollment of 23.
