= Novesta Township, Michigan =

- Township
- Location within the state of Michigan
- Coordinates: 43°32′51″N 83°10′45″W
- Country: United States
- State: Michigan
- County: Tuscola

Area
  - Total: 35.9 sq mi (93.0 km^{2})
  - Land: 35.9 sq mi (93.0 km^{2})
  - Water: 0 sq mi (0.0 km^{2})
- Elevation: 732 ft (223 m)

Population (2020)
  - Total: 1,443
  - Density: 40.2/sq mi (15.5/km^{2})
- Time zone: UTC-5 (Eastern (EST))
  - Summer (DST): UTC-4 (EDT)
- ZIP code: 48726 (Cass City); 48729 (Deford)
- FIPS code: 26-59420
- GNIS feature ID: 1626828
- Website: https://www.novestatownship.org/

Novesta Township is a civil township of Tuscola County in the U.S. state of Michigan. The population was 1,443 at the 2020 census.

== Communities ==
- Deford is an unincorporated community in the southern part of the township.
- Cass City is a village to the north in Elkland Township with a small part in Novesta Township south of Elmwood Road. The Cass City Post Office with ZIP code 48726 also serves the northern portion of Novesta Township.
- Novesta Township is bordered on the north by Elkland Township, on the west by Ellington Township, on the south by Kingston Township, and on the east by Sanilac County's Evergreen Township.

== Government ==
District	Number	Officeholder
U.S. Representative	10	Lisa McClain
State Senate	31	Kevin Daley
State Representative	84	Phil Green
County Commissioner	3	Thomas Bardwell
School District	Cass City	Multiple; see article

== Geography ==
According to the United States Census Bureau, the township has a total area of 35.9 square miles (93 km^{2}), all land.

== Demographics ==
As of the census of 2000, there were 1,606 people, 568 households, and 444 families residing in the township. The population density was 44.7 inhabitants per square mile (17.3/km^{2}). There were 622 housing units at an average density of 17.3 per square mile (6.7/km^{2}). The racial makeup of the township was 97.26% White, 0.25% African American, 0.81% Native American, 0.06% Asian, 0.44% from other races, and 1.18% from two or more races. Hispanic or Latino of any race were 2.24% of the population.

There were 568 households, out of which 37.1% had children under the age of 18 living with them, 63.9% were married couples living together, 10.7% had a female householder with no husband present, and 21.8% were non-families. 18.3% of all households were made up of individuals, and 8.3% had someone living alone who was 65 years of age or older. The average household size was 2.82 and the average family size was 3.18.

In the township the population was spread out, with 28.0% under the age of 18, 8.8% from 18 to 24, 28.5% from 25 to 44, 23.9% from 45 to 64, and 10.8% who were 65 years of age or older. The median age was 37 years. For every 100 females, there were 104.6 males. For every 100 females age 18 and over, there were 101.9 males.

The median income for a household in the township was $38,583, and the median income for a family was $42,100. Males had a median income of $32,984 versus $23,438 for females. The per capita income for the township was $15,624. About 6.4% of families and 11.4% of the population were below the poverty line, including 11.1% of those under age 18 and 12.2% of those age 65 or over.

== History ==
Novesta Post Office opened on August 25, 1874, and closed on July 31, 1905. It was located approximately at Deckerville and Crawford roads.
