= Pewamo Formation =

Geologic formation in Michigan, United States

- Stratigraphic range: mid-Pennsylvanian
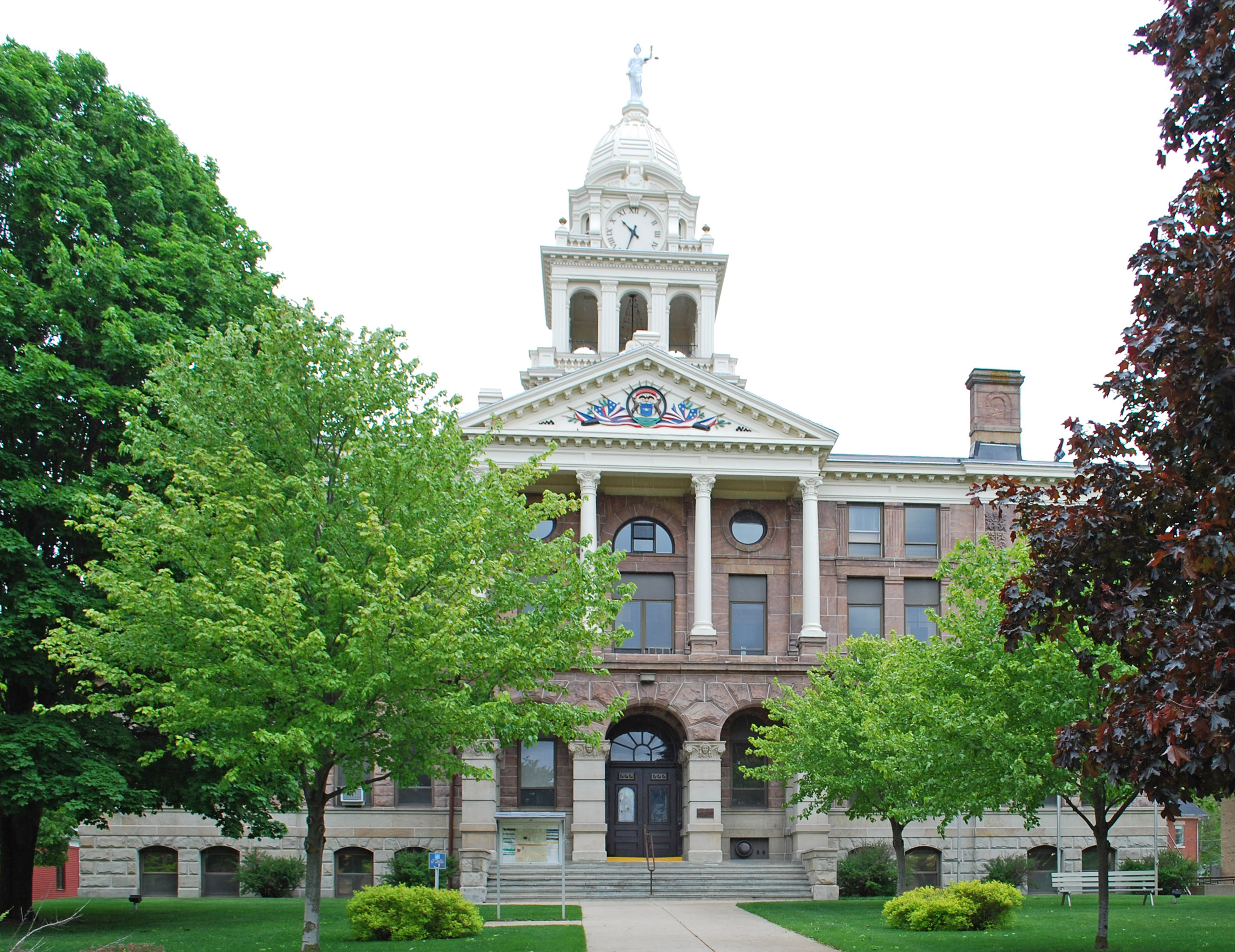
- Ionia County Courthouse in Ionia, Michigan, built from red sandstone of the Pewamo Formation
- Type: Formation
- Underlies: Pleistocene glacial till
- Overlies: Saginaw Formation, Grand River Formation?
- Thickness: 23 m (75 ft)

Lithology
- Primary: sandstone
- Other: mudstone

Location
- Region: Michigan
- Country: United States
- Extent: Michigan Basin

Type section
- Named for: Pewamo, Michigan
- Named by: Benison, Knapp, & Dannenhoffer, 2011

The Pewamo Formation or Pewamo Sandstone is a geologic formation in the Michigan Basin of central Michigan. It is mostly red quartz arenite sandstone, deposited during the later part of the Carboniferous Period (middle of the Pennsylvanian Subperiod).

Red sandstone has long been used as a building stone in central Michigan. Geologists informally referred to the strata as the "Ionia Formation" or "Jurassic red beds", though the layers remained poorly studied for many years. An unpublished thesis by Shaffer (1969) reported fossils similar to the Jurassic pollen form Classopollis in red layers brought up by drill cores. Shaffer's thesis led to a widespread misconception that the red beds were Jurassic in age. The origin of the purported Jurassic pollen is unclear, though it may have been from younger sediments reworked by the overlying Pleistocene till.

More extensive investigation in 2008 involved further drill coring, architectural surveys, and rediscovery of the abandoned sandstone quarries. This work confirms that the building stone and deeper subsurface sandstone near Ionia represent the same geological formation. The study also discovered a consistent set of Pennsylvanian plant spores in the sandstone, disputing the claimed Jurassic age. The Pewamo Formation is probably equivalent to the "Haybridge strata" in east-central Michigan, a unit of Carboniferous coal, red shale and sandstone, and rare gray shale, replete with plant fossils. Both the Pewamo and Haybridge strata lie above the Saginaw Formation.

The red sandstone was probably originally aeolian (wind-blown sand dunes). The formation also has a few layers of mudstone: older layers are dark grey with mudcracks (representing shallow freshwater lakes) while younger layers are paler and packed with gypsum crystals (representing salty ephemeral lakes). The climate would have been dry during the Pewamo Formation, moreso than the older Saginaw Formation or the "Haybridge strata" further east.
