= Charleston, Michigan =

Charleston may refer to the following places in the U.S. state of Michigan:

- Charleston Township, Michigan in Kalamazoo County
- Charleston, Sanilac County, Michigan, a historical settlement in Delaware Township
- Charleston, Cass County, Michigan, a historical settlement in Volinia Township
