= Evergreen Township =

Evergreen Township may refer to:

- Evergreen Township, Montcalm County, Michigan
- Evergreen Township, Sanilac County, Michigan
- Evergreen Township, Minnesota
- Evergreen Township, Ward County, North Dakota, in Ward County, North Dakota
