= Cass City, Michigan =

- Village
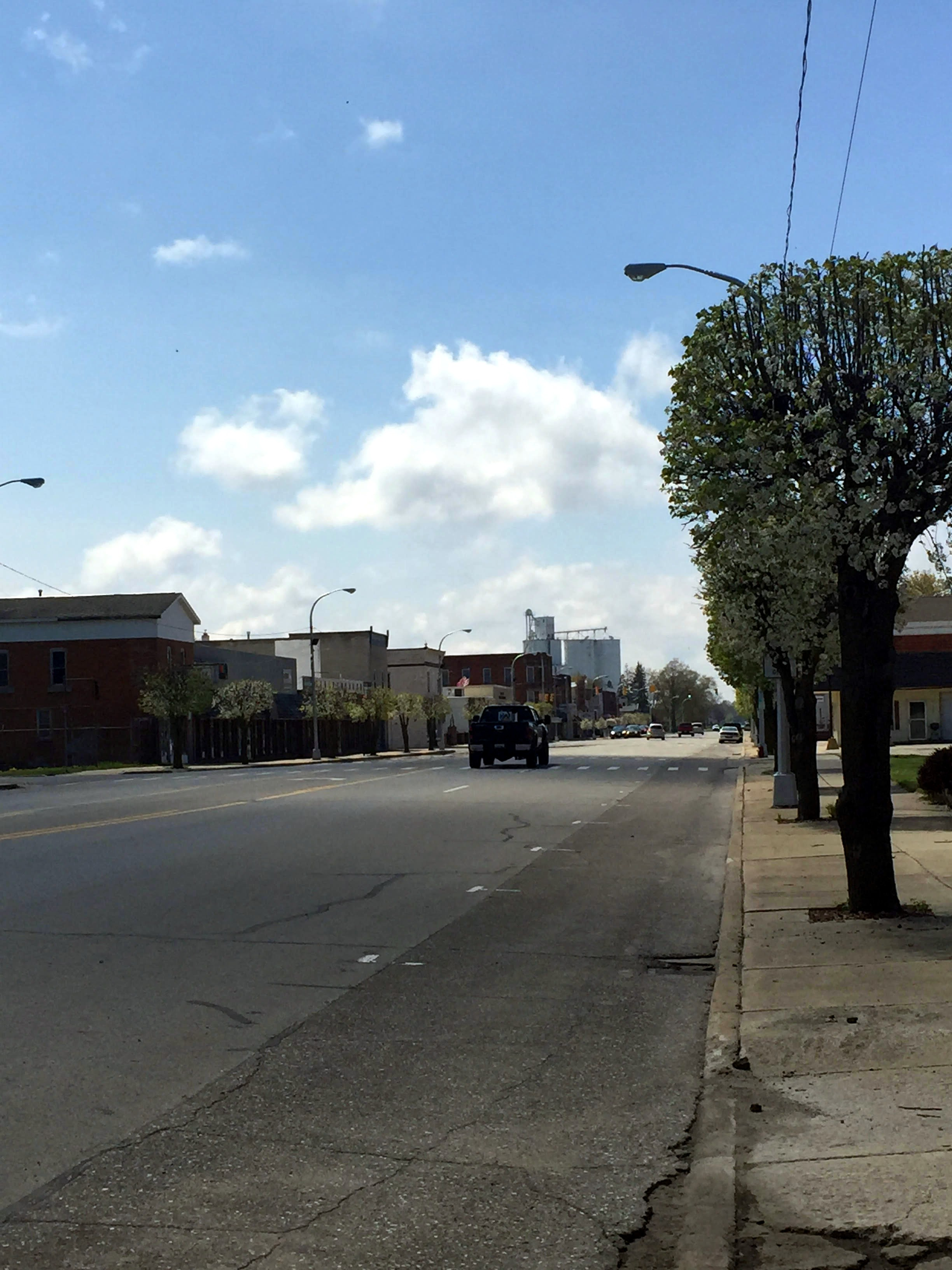
- Main Street (M-81), Cass City
- Motto: "each step in the right direction"
- Location of Cass City, Michigan
- Coordinates: 43°35′58″N 83°10′35″W
- Country: United States
- State: Michigan
- County: Tuscola
- Township: Elkland
- Named for: Cass River

Area
  - Total: 1.77 sq mi (4.58 km^{2})
  - Land: 1.76 sq mi (4.57 km^{2})
  - Water: 0.0039 sq mi (0.01 km^{2})
- Elevation: 745 ft (227 m)

Population (2020)
  - Total: 2,494
  - Density: 1,413.3/sq mi (545.69/km^{2})
- Time zone: UTC-5 (Eastern (EST))
  - Summer (DST): UTC-4 (EDT)
- ZIP code: 48726
- Area code: 989
- FIPS code: 26-13880
- GNIS feature ID: 0622846
- Website: Village of Cass City, Michigan

Cass City is a village in Elkland Township, Tuscola County in the Flint/Tri-Cities area of the U.S. state of Michigan. As of the 2020 census, Cass City had a population of 2,494. It is located along M-81 approximately four miles (6.4 km) west of that highway's intersection with M-53. Cass City is surrounded by several communities, including Colwood, Deford, Elmwood and Ellington.

== History ==
The village and the nearby Cass River are both named after General Lewis Cass, the territorial governor of Michigan in the earlier 19th century and the Democratic nominee for president of the United States in 1848. It is currently within Michigan's 10th congressional district.

A sawmill was established at this location in 1851. Farming settlers first came here in 1855. Cass City was incorporated as a village in 1883.

It is notorious as the hometown of the 1930s murderer, holdup man and thief, Andrew Metelski (Andrzejowl Metelskiemu).

== Geography ==
According to the United States Census Bureau, the village has a total area of 1.79 square miles (4.64 km^{2}), of which 1.78 square miles (4.61 km^{2}) is land and 0.01 square miles (0.03 km^{2}) is water.

=== Climate ===
This climatic region has large seasonal temperature differences, with warm to hot (and often humid) summers and cold (sometimes severely cold) winters. According to the Köppen Climate Classification system, Cass City has a humid continental climate, abbreviated "Dfb" on climate maps.

Climate data for Cass City, Michigan (1991–2020 normals, extremes 1961–present)
Month	Jan	Feb	Mar	Apr	May	Jun	Jul	Aug	Sep	Oct	Nov	Dec	Year
Record high °F (°C)	62 (17)	67 (19)	85 (29)	92 (33)	102 (39)	102 (39)	108 (42)	99 (37)	94 (34)	89 (32)	76 (24)	69 (21)	108 (42)
Mean daily maximum °F (°C)	28.6 (−1.9)	31.6 (−0.2)	42.0 (5.6)	54.9 (12.7)	67.6 (19.8)	77.3 (25.2)	80.4 (26.9)	78.5 (25.8)	71.9 (22.2)	59.0 (15.0)	45.4 (7.4)	34.3 (1.3)	56.0 (13.3)
Daily mean °F (°C)	20.8 (−6.2)	22.5 (−5.3)	32.2 (0.1)	43.5 (6.4)	55.4 (13.0)	65.5 (18.6)	68.8 (20.4)	67.2 (19.6)	60.2 (15.7)	48.8 (9.3)	37.2 (2.9)	27.4 (−2.6)	45.8 (7.7)
Mean daily minimum °F (°C)	12.9 (−10.6)	13.3 (−10.4)	22.3 (−5.4)	32.2 (0.1)	43.2 (6.2)	53.7 (12.1)	57.2 (14.0)	55.9 (13.3)	48.5 (9.2)	38.6 (3.7)	29.0 (−1.7)	20.6 (−6.3)	35.6 (2.0)
Record low °F (°C)	−26 (−32)	−28 (−33)	−26 (−32)	0 (−18)	16 (−9)	30 (−1)	39 (4)	32 (0)	28 (−2)	16 (−9)	4 (−16)	−26 (−32)	−28 (−33)
Average precipitation inches (mm)	2.02 (51)	1.79 (45)	1.99 (51)	3.50 (89)	3.52 (89)	3.27 (83)	3.24 (82)	3.12 (79)	3.17 (81)	2.91 (74)	2.52 (64)	2.00 (51)	33.05 (839)
Average snowfall inches (cm)	14.4 (37)	9.3 (24)	5.0 (13)	1.6 (4.1)	0.0 (0.0)	0.0 (0.0)	0.0 (0.0)	0.0 (0.0)	0.0 (0.0)	0.1 (0.25)	3.1 (7.9)	9.0 (23)	42.5 (108)
Average precipitation days (≥ 0.01 in)	13.9	9.8	10.2	12.2	12.4	10.3	9.4	10.7	10.4	12.4	13.0	12.9	137.6
Average snowy days (≥ 0.1 in)	9.0	6.2	3.1	1.3	0.0	0.0	0.0	0.0	0.0	0.1	1.7	7.1	28.5
Source: NOAA

== Demographics ==
Historical population
Census	Pop.	Note	%±
1880	313		—
1890	813		159.7%
1900	1,113		36.9%
1910	1,126		1.2%
1920	1,228		9.1%
1930	1,201		−2.2%
1940	1,362		13.4%
1950	1,762		29.4%
1960	1,945		10.4%
1970	1,974		1.5%
1980	2,258		14.4%
1990	2,276		0.8%
2000	2,643		16.1%
2010	2,428		−8.1%
2020	2,494		2.7%
2023 (est.)	2,487	▼	−0.3%
U.S. Decennial Census

=== 2020 census ===
As of the 2020 census, Cass City had a population of 2,494. The median age was 44.4 years. 20.5% of residents were under the age of 18 and 24.3% of residents were 65 years of age or older. For every 100 females there were 87.4 males, and for every 100 females age 18 and over there were 84.9 males age 18 and over.

0.0% of residents lived in urban areas, while 100.0% lived in rural areas.

There were 1,067 households in Cass City, of which 25.7% had children under the age of 18 living in them. Of all households, 42.8% were married-couple households, 16.4% were households with a male householder and no spouse or partner present, and 32.4% were households with a female householder and no spouse or partner present. About 34.0% of all households were made up of individuals and 17.9% had someone living alone who was 65 years of age or older.

There were 1,183 housing units, of which 9.8% were vacant. The homeowner vacancy rate was 1.4% and the rental vacancy rate was 9.4%.

Racial composition as of the 2020 census
Race	Number	Percent
White	2,364	94.8%
Black or African American	12	0.5%
American Indian and Alaska Native	2	0.1%
Asian	10	0.4%
Native Hawaiian and Other Pacific Islander	1	0.0%
Some other race	16	0.6%
Two or more races	89	3.6%
Hispanic or Latino (of any race)	89	3.6%

=== 2010 census ===
As of the census of 2010, there were 2,428 people, 1,024 households, and 627 families living in the village. The population density was 1,364.0 inhabitants per square mile (526.6/km^{2}). There were 1,177 housing units at an average density of 661.2 per square mile (255.3/km^{2}). The racial makeup of the village was 96.9% White, 0.2% African American, 0.5% Native American, 0.5% Asian, 0.2% from other races, and 1.7% from two or more races. Hispanic or Latino of any race were 2.5% of the population.

There were 1,024 households, of which 29.1% had children under the age of 18 living with them, 44.8% were married couples living together, 12.2% had a female householder with no husband present, 4.2% had a male householder with no wife present, and 38.8% were non-families. 33.2% of all households were made up of individuals, and 18.2% had someone living alone who was 65 years of age or older. The average household size was 2.26 and the average family size was 2.88.

The median age in the village was 43.7 years. 21.9% of residents were under the age of 18; 7.6% were between the ages of 18 and 24; 21.8% were from 25 to 44; 25.8% were from 45 to 64; and 22.9% were 65 years of age or older. The gender makeup of the village was 47.0% male and 53.0% female.

=== 2000 census ===
As of the census of 2000, there were 6,481 people, 4,670 households, and 3,892 families living in the village. The population density was 1,523.7 inhabitants per square mile (588.3/km^{2}). There were 1,159 housing units at an average density of 668.2 per square mile (258.0/km^{2}).

There were 1,670 households, out of which 38.7% had children under the age of 18 living with them, 49.3% were married couples living together, 12.8% had a female householder with no husband present, and 35.2% were non-families. 32.0% of all households were made up of individuals, and 16.5% had someone living alone who was 65 years of age or older. The average household size was 2.31 and the average family size was 2.91.

In the village, the population was spread out, with 34.3% under the age of 18, 8.2% from 18 to 24, 24.9% from 25 to 44, 21.4% from 45 to 64, and 12.2% who were 65 years of age or older. The median age was 40 years. For every 100 females, there were 86.1 males; for every 100 females age 18 and over, there were 79.1 males 18 and over.

The median income for a household in the village was $33,397, and the median income for a family was $41,289. Males had a median income of $31,714 versus $24,853 for females. The per capita income for the village was $17,159. About 8.1% of families and 10.8% of the population were below the poverty line, including 16.4% of those under age 18 and 7.1% of those age 65 or over.

== Economy ==
Agriculture is a central part of the Cass City economy, along with a small amount of industry (including Walbro Corp.).

== Arts and culture ==
=== Library ===
Cass City is the home of the Rawson Memorial Library, a district library that serves Cass City, Elkland Township, Elmwood Township and Novesta Township. The library also contracts with Ellington Township, Evergreen Township, Grant Township and Greenleaf Township for library services. The library started in 1910 as a project of a local Women's Study Club and was reorganized in 1966 as the Cass City and Elkland Township Library, a district library.

The library maintains online archives of two local newspapers, the Cass City Chronicle (published 1899-2023) and the Cass City Enterprise (published 1881–1906).

In 2007, Rawson Memorial Library was the recipient of the 2007 State Librarian's Excellence Award for exemplary public service. It was recognized for creating its own online bookstore, a traveling Business Resource Center, home delivery, one-on-one computer training, and a "very successful young-adult section" with "more than 750 books, magazines and paperbacks and seating for 14 people."

== Education ==
Cass City is home to one of the campuses of the Baker College System, with programs that include the Accelerated Bachelor of Business degree as well as classes in health science, early childhood education, and automotive services technology. Public schools are managed by Cass City Public Schools.

== Notable people ==
- Larry MacPhail, Hall of Fame executive with Major League Baseball; born in Cass City
- Brewster H. Shaw, NASA astronaut, a U.S. Air Force colonel, and executive at Boeing; born in Cass City
- Terry P. Richardson, Congressional Medal of Honor winner, Vietnam War, 1968; born in Cass City
