= Cass City Jr./Sr. High School =

Middle/high school in Cass City, Michigan, United States

Location
- 4868 N Seeger Street; Cass City, (Tuscola County), Michigan 48726; United States; 43°36′43.31″N 83°10′29.38″W

Information
- School type: Public, middle school / high school
- Opened: 1967
- School district: Cass City Public Schools
- CEEB code: 230505
- NCES School ID: 260840004391
- Principal: Chad Daniels
- Teaching staff: 22.12 (FTE)
- Grades: 7 to 12
- Gender: Co-ed
- Enrollment: 418 (2024-2025)
- Student to teacher ratio: 18.90
- Colors: Maroon and white
- Athletics conference: Greater Thumb Conference
- Mascot: Red Hawk
- Team name: Cass City Red Hawks
- Rival: Unionville-Sebewaing Area High School
- Website: www.casscityschools.org/schools/jr-sr-high/

Cass City Jr./Sr. High School is a public middle school and high school located in Cass City, Michigan, United States.

== History ==
The school has served grades 9 to 12 since its construction in 1967, and additionally grades 7 to 8 since 2013.

== Extracurricular activities ==
Cass City Jr./Sr. High School offers a variety of extracurricular activities. These include several sports, such as football, wrestling, basketball, baseball, volleyball, as well as marching and concert band, drama club, and yearbook.

The Cass City Red Hawks wrestling team won three out of four district titles from 2009 to 2012. The girls' cross country team has taken multiple league titles as well has regional titles. The JV football team was undefeated in the 2011 season.

== Notable alumni ==
- Mason Erla (2016), baseball player in the Los Angeles Angels organization
