= Sanilac Petroglyphs Historic State Park =

Park in Michigan, USA

- ezhibiigadek asin
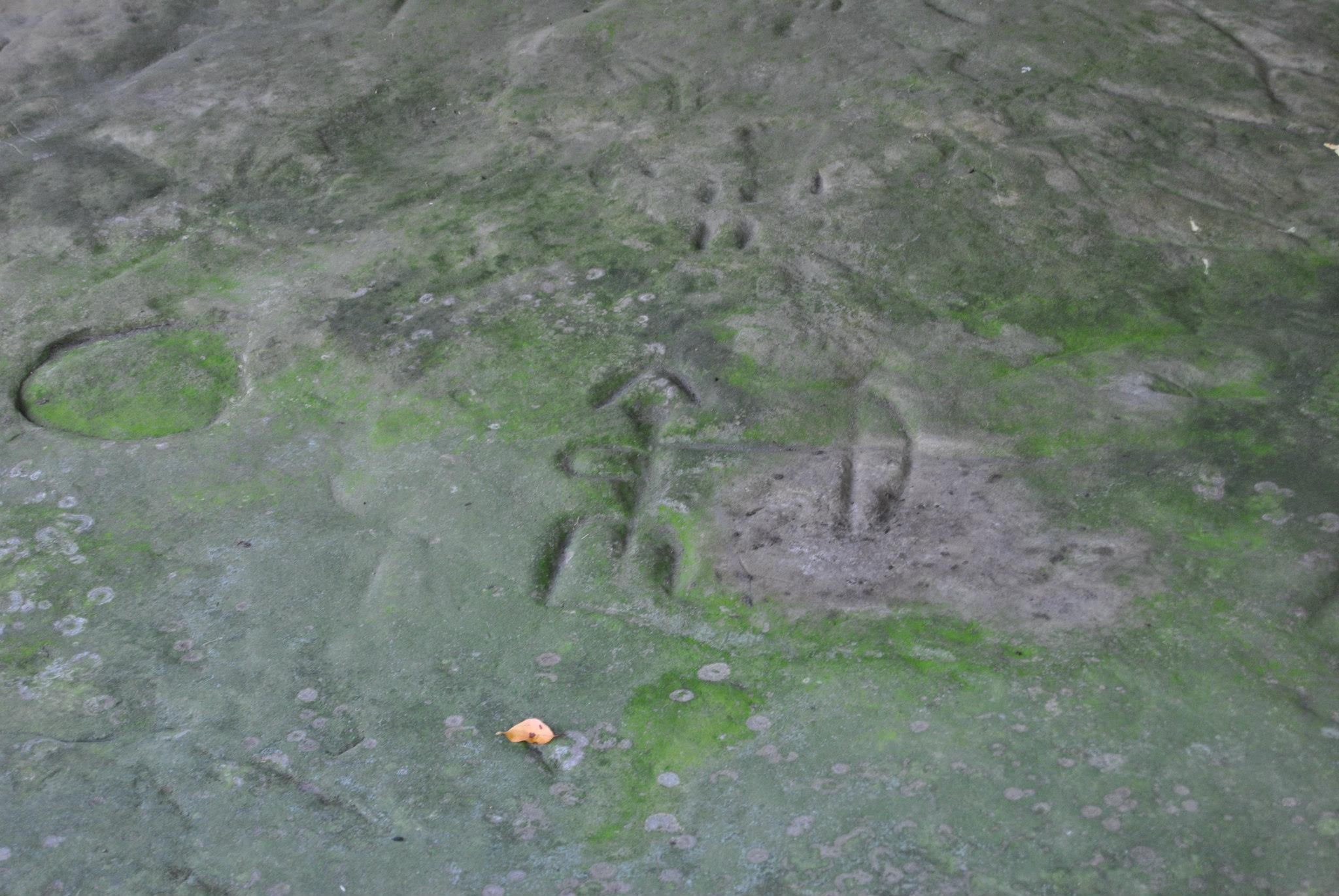
- Detail of a carved archer-like figure at the site

- Location within Michigan Location within the United States
- Location: The Thumb, Sanilac County, Michigan, United States
- Nearest town: Cass City, Michigan
- Coordinates: 43°39′28″N 83°01′07″W
- Area: 240 acres (97 ha)
- Elevation: 751 feet (229 m)
- Established: 1971
- Administrator: Michigan Department of Natural Resources / Saginaw Chippewa Nation
- Visitors: 4,300 (in 2015)
- Designation: Michigan state park
- Website: Official website
- Sanilac Petroglyphs
- U.S. National Register of Historic Places
- Michigan State Historic Site
- NRHP reference No.: 71001024
- Added to NRHP: January 25, 1971

Sanilac Petroglyphs Historic State Park is a historic preservation area in the U.S. state of Michigan. The state park, also known as ezhibiigadek asin (Ojibwe for "written on stone"), consists of 240 acres (97 ha) in Greenleaf Township, Sanilac County, in Michigan's Thumb. It contains the largest collection of Native American petroglyphs in Michigan. The carvings were created in the pre-Columbian era and represent aspects of Native American spirituality. An interpretive hiking trail within the park passes along the nearby Cass River.

The park is co-managed by the Michigan Department of Natural Resources and the Saginaw Chippewa Nation. It was donated to the state by the Michigan Archaeological Society in 1971, and it is listed on the National Register of Historic Places.

== The petroglyphs ==
=== Origins ===
The main feature of the park is a 1,000-square-foot (93 m^{2}) sandstone outcrop with around 165 petroglyphs on it. The largest grouping of such carvings in Michigan, they were likely carved between 300 and 1,400 years ago. They were discovered by the area's settlers after much of the Thumb region was burned over by a massive forest fire in 1881.

The petroglyphs include depictions of the religious and cultural knowledge of Great Lakes Native American tribes. Among the depictions of swirls, lines, handprints, and living beings are:

- Ebmodaakowet, the archer who shoots knowledge into the future;
- Migizi Inini, the Eagle Man, who looks to the east–the direction of the new day–and flies over to ensure people are following traditions and teachings;
- Mishibizhew, the water panther, who protects the waters of the Great Lakes.

=== Study and preservation ===
Archaeologists have studied the site since the 1920s. Stone tools and pottery found in the park show that various tribal groups have occupied the area periodically throughout the last 8,000 years. The petroglyphs were thoroughly recorded in 1940 by Darrel J. Richards and Carl Holmquist of the Aboriginal Research Club of Detroit, who created drawings and castings of the carvings. Richards's drawings are now in the collection of the Cranbrook Institute of Science in Bloomfield Hills, Michigan.

Afterward, Cranbrook worked with the University of Michigan's Museum of Anthropology and the Michigan Department of Natural Resources to create the first plan to preserve the site. Later, in 1966, 240 acres (97 ha) around the petroglyphs was purchased from two different owners by the Michigan Archaeological Society, which deeded it to the state five years later. In 1971, the site was both established as a Michigan state park and listed on the National Register of Historic Places.

The state has made a series of improvements to the site to protect the slab, including a wooden pavilion erected in the mid-1990s and a chain-link fence surrounding the petroglyph site.

In 2018, Michigan Department of Transportation specialists used Lidar along with detailed close-up photographs to collect approximately 3 billion information points and map the site to accuracy in the millimeter range, revealing details that would not be apparent to the unaided human eye. From this collection of data, The resultant digital models will document the site and can be used to track changes in the petroglyphs over time.

=== Hindrances to preservation ===
The sandstone slab in which the petroglyphs were carved is fragile and subject to weathering and other environmental forces. It has been walked upon and vandalized with graffiti over the years; someone, long ago prior to the 1920s, chipped out an entire symbol and the surrounding rock for a keepsake.

The most recent act of vandalism occurred in 2017 when three images were carved on the rock by unknown individuals. This human activity combined with natural weathering has made the actual petroglyphs difficult for visitors to see. Specialists are concerned that unless more is done to preserve the carvings better, they will be gone by the late 21st century.

== Park ecology ==
Beyond the rock carvings, the Cass River floodplain forest within the park can be explored via a 1.5-mile (2.4 km) trail loop, which crosses the river twice. The area is home to a wide variety of animals including: deer, turkey, ruffed grouse, green heron, and belted kingfisher.

Additionally, numerous outcrops of Marshall Sandstone are visible, as is the site of a 19th-century logging camp. Signs placed along the trail interpret points of natural and historical interest.

== Park management ==
On December 2, 2019, the Michigan Department of Natural Resources and the Saginaw Chippewa Nation signed a memorandum of understanding to co-manage the park. This historic agreement marks the first state-tribal co-management of a Michigan state park. The petroglyphs pavilion is open for view by the general public between dates approximating Memorial Day and Labor Day, Wednesdays through Sundays, from 10:00 am until 5 pm.

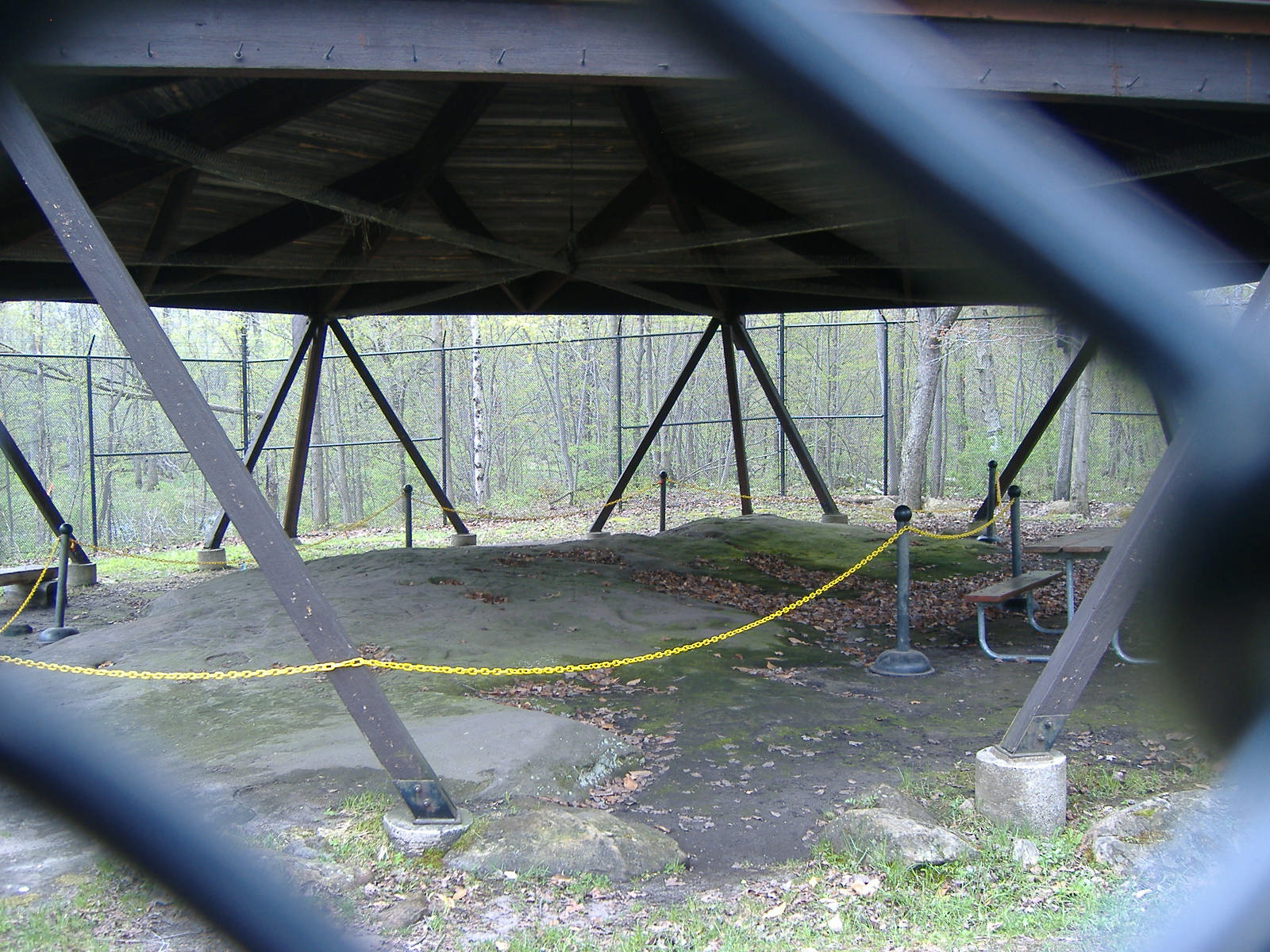
The site under its protective shelter

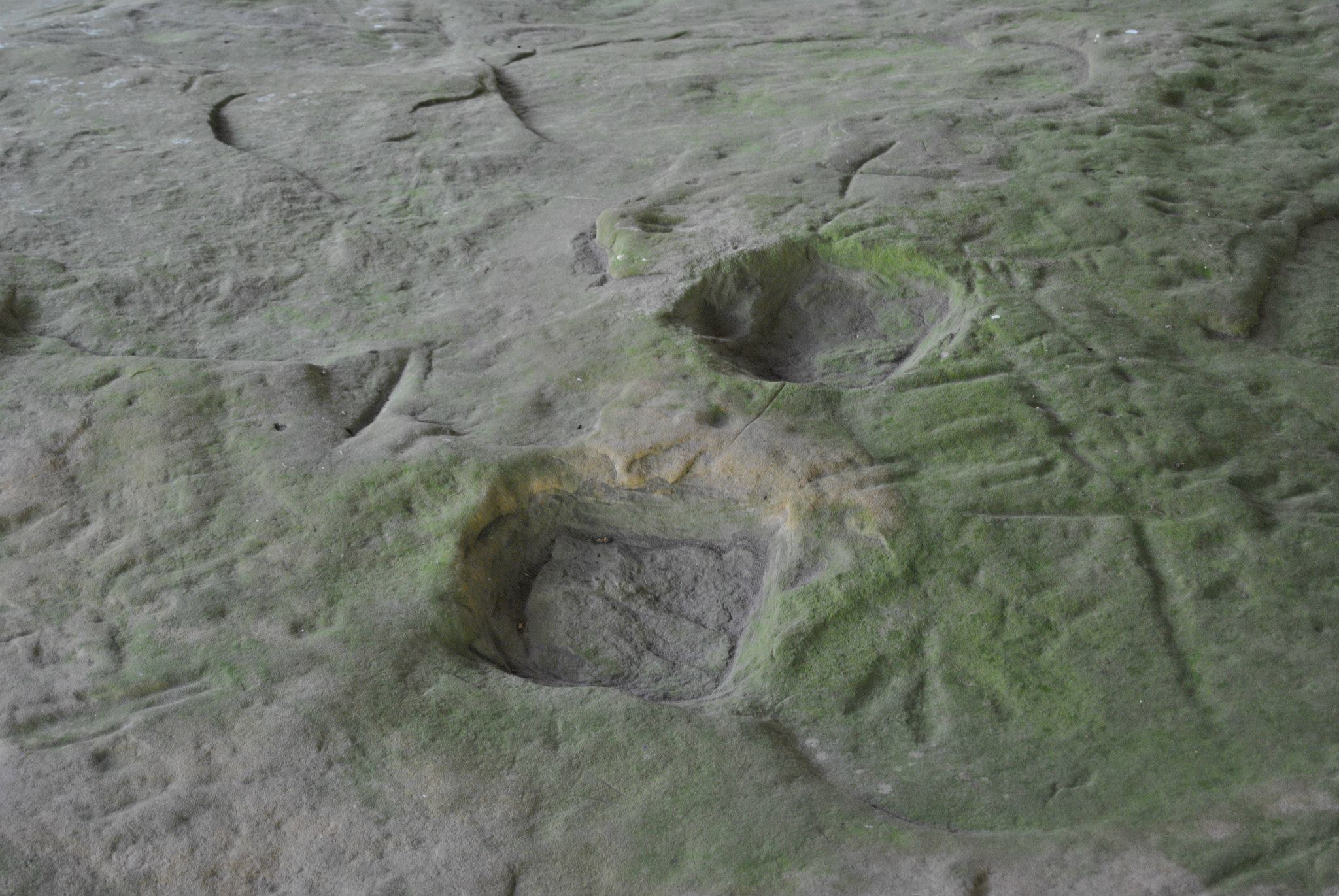
Gaps in the surface of the stone indicate where symbols have been excised

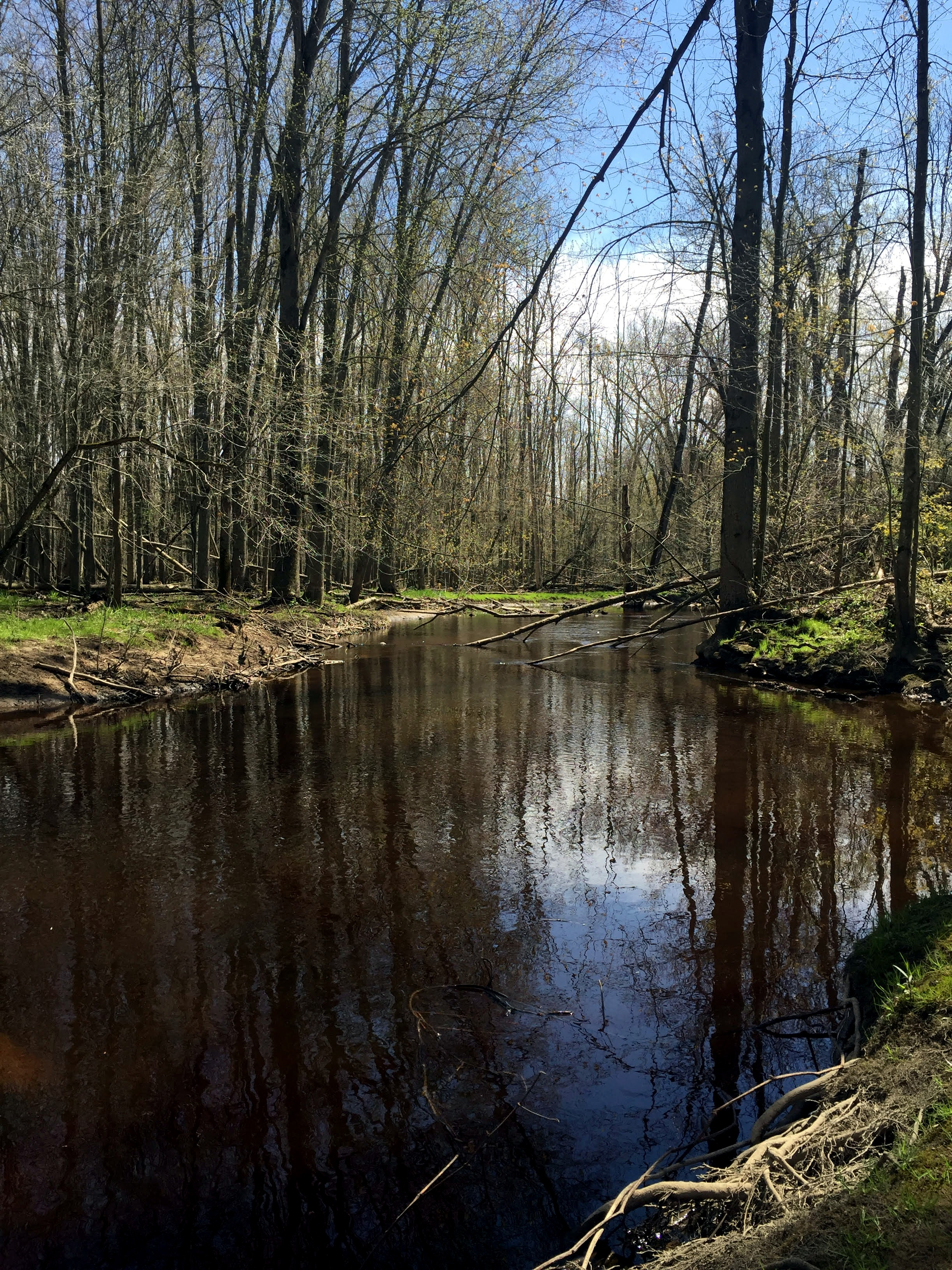
Cass River North Branch

== See also ==
- Petroglyphs Provincial Park - largest collection of First Nations petroglyphs in Ontario, Canada
