= Marshall Sandstone =

Geologic formation in Michigan, United States

- Stratigraphic range: Mississippian
- Type: Formation
- Underlies: Michigan Formation
- Overlies: Coldwater Shale

Location
- Region: Michigan
- Country: United States

The Marshall Sandstone is a geologic formation in Michigan. It preserves fossils dating back to the Mississippian period.

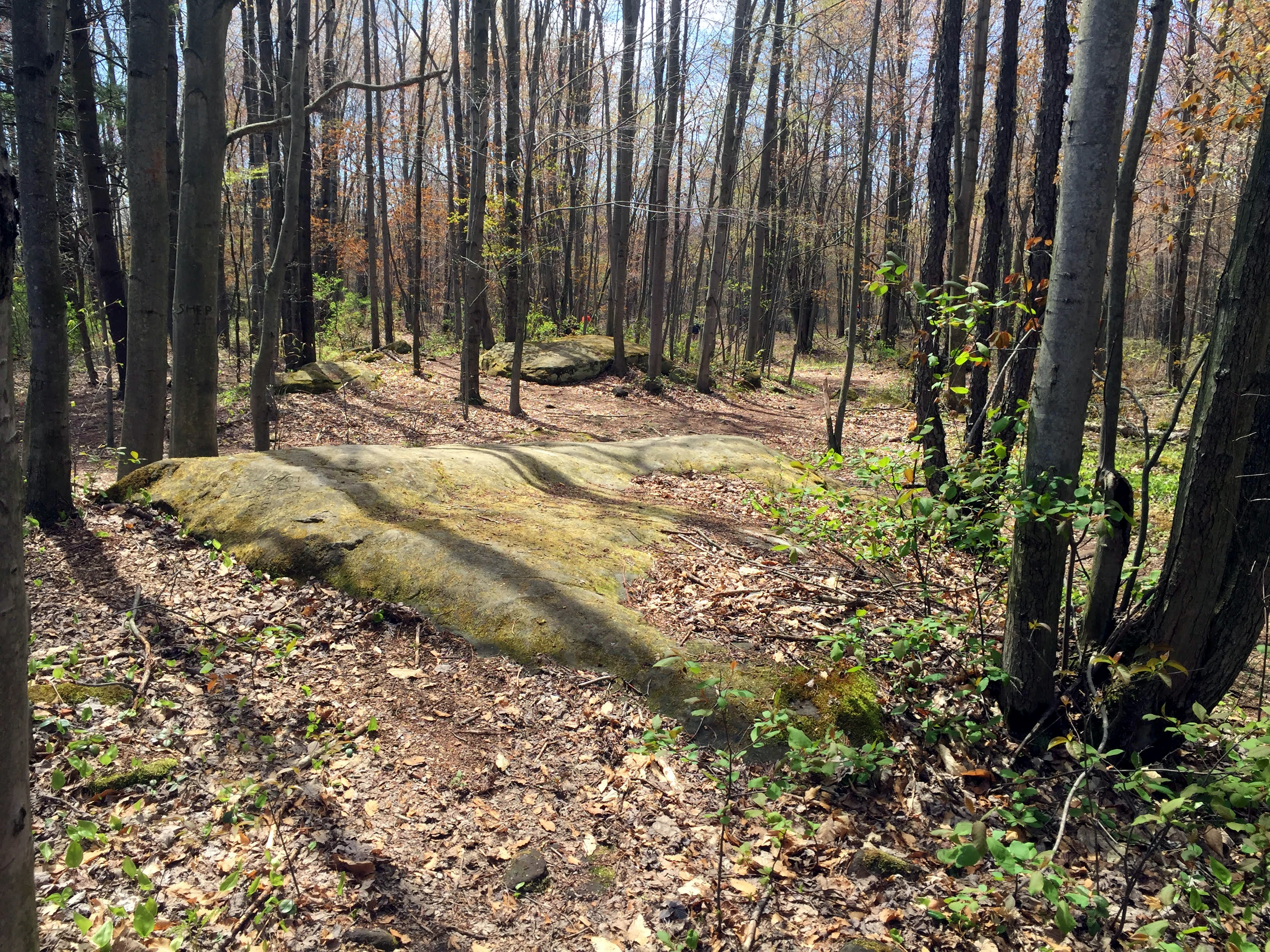
An outcrop of Marshall Sandstone at Sanilac Petroglyphs Historic State Park
