= Forestville, Michigan =

- Village
- Location of Forestville, Michigan
- Coordinates: 43°39′41″N 82°36′35″W
- Country: United States
- State: Michigan
- County: Sanilac

Area
  - Total: 0.80 sq mi (2.06 km^{2})
  - Land: 0.80 sq mi (2.06 km^{2})
  - Water: 0 sq mi (0.00 km^{2})
- Elevation: 633 ft (193 m)

Population (2020)
  - Total: 104
  - Density: 130.9/sq mi (50.56/km^{2})
- Time zone: UTC-5 (Eastern (EST))
  - Summer (DST): UTC-4 (EDT)
- ZIP code: 48434
- Area code: 989
- FIPS code: 26-29660
- GNIS feature ID: 0626287
- Website: https://forestvillemichigan.com/

Forestville is a village in Sanilac County in the U.S. state of Michigan. The population was 104 at the 2020 census, making it the least-populous village in Michigan. It does not have a true harbor onto Lake Huron, but the village does have a boat launch site. Forestville receives city water from nearby Harbor Beach. The village is within Delaware Township.

== Geography ==
According to the United States Census Bureau, the village has a total area of 0.79 square miles (2.05 km^{2}), all land.

== History ==
Forestville began with the building of a sawmill here in 1854. Its post office first opened in 1856. It was incorporated as a village in 1895.

== Demographics ==
Historical population
Census	Pop.	Note	%±
1870	121		—
1880	192		58.7%
1900	282		—
1910	234		−17.0%
1920	140		−40.2%
1930	74		−47.1%
1940	156		110.8%
1950	124		−20.5%
1960	121		−2.4%
1970	110		−9.1%
1980	159		44.5%
1990	153		−3.8%
2000	127		−17.0%
2010	136		7.1%
2020	104		−23.5%
U.S. Decennial Census

=== 2010 census ===
As of the census of 2010, there were 136 people, 58 households, and 36 families living in the village. The population density was 172.2 inhabitants per square mile (66.5/km^{2}). There were 164 housing units at an average density of 207.6 per square mile (80.2/km^{2}). The racial makeup of the village was 97.1% White, 1.5% Native American, 0.7% from other races, and 0.7% from two or more races. Hispanic or Latino of any race were 5.1% of the population.

There were 58 households, of which 17.2% had children under the age of 18 living with them, 58.6% were married couples living together, 3.4% had a female householder with no husband present, and 37.9% were non-families. 37.9% of all households were made up of individuals, and 15.5% had someone living alone who was 65 years of age or older. The average household size was 2.34 and the average family size was 3.11.

The median age in the village was 55.5 years. 17.6% of residents were under the age of 18; 2.9% were between the ages of 18 and 24; 16.2% were from 25 to 44; 38.1% were from 45 to 64; and 25% were 65 years of age or older. The gender makeup of the village was 50.7% male and 49.3% female.

=== 2000 census ===
As of the census of 2000, there were 127 people, 56 households, and 36 families living in the village. The population density was 153.2 inhabitants per square mile (59.2/km^{2}). There were 147 housing units at an average density of 177.4 per square mile (68.5/km^{2}). The racial makeup of the village was 95.28% White, 0.79% Native American, and 3.94% from two or more races. Hispanic or Latino of any race were 2.36% of the population.

There were 56 households, out of which 25.0% had children under the age of 18 living with them, 48.2% were married couples living together, 14.3% had a female householder with no husband present, and 35.7% were non-families. 35.7% of all households were made up of individuals, and 23.2% had someone living alone who was 65 years of age or older. The average household size was 2.27 and the average family size was 2.94.

In the village, the population was spread out, with 24.4% under the age of 18, 6.3% from 18 to 24, 17.3% from 25 to 44, 26.0% from 45 to 64, and 26.0% who were 65 years of age or older. The median age was 46 years. For every 100 females, there were 111.7 males. For every 100 females age 18 and over, there were 108.7 males.

The median income for a household in the village was $45,625, and the median income for a family was $62,917. Males had a median income of $29,375 versus $17,321 for females. The per capita income for the village was $21,130. There were 6.9% of families and 10.0% of the population living below the poverty line, including 6.3% of under eighteens and 24.2% of those over 64.
