= Terry P. Richardson =

Retired American soldier (born 1948)

Terry Patrick Richardson
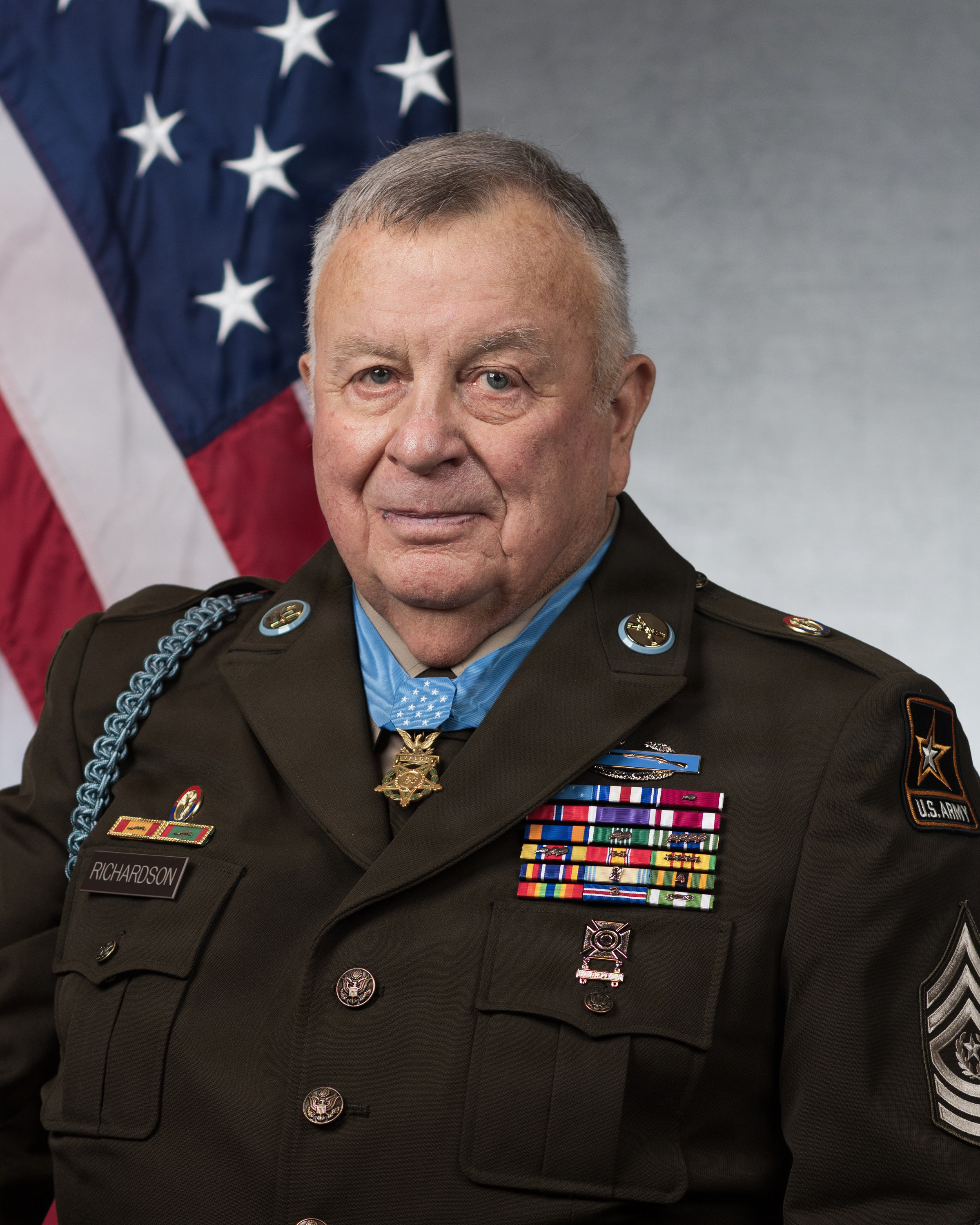
- Richardson after being presented with his Medal of Honor, 2026
- Born: 7 January 1948 (age 78); Cass City, Michigan
- Military career
- Allegiance: United States
- Branch: United States Army
- Service years: 1967–1969; 1978–2008
- Rank: Command sergeant major
- Units: Company A, 1st Battalion, 28th Infantry Regiment
- Conflicts: Vietnam War
- Awards: Medal of Honor; Legion of Merit (2); Bronze Star Medal; Purple Heart

Terry Patrick Richardson (born 7 January 1948) is a retired United States Army soldier who received the Medal of Honor on 2 March 2026 for his actions on 14 September 1968 during the Vietnam War.

== Early life ==
Richardson was born on 7 January 1948 in Cass City, Michigan. The oldest of 13 children, he worked at his father's gas station and on his family's 80-acre farm growing up. From eighth grade to graduation, he played basketball, football, baseball and track. He graduated from Akron-Fairgrove School in 1966 and worked with his father and grandfather on the family farm.

== Military career ==
Richardson was drafted and entered the United States Army in May 1967 and completed basic training at Fort Knox, Kentucky, and was sent to Fort McClellan, Alabama, to undergo Infantry Advanced Individual Training. Shortly after, he was selected to attend Non-Commissioned Officer School at Fort Benning, Georgia. He graduated with honors and was promoted to staff sergeant on 22 January 1968. He was then assigned as a tactical non-commissioned officer at Fort Polk, Louisiana. He received orders to deploy to South Vietnam and was assigned to Company A, 1st Battalion, 28th Infantry, 1st Infantry Division in May 1968.

He was a squad leader in 1st Platoon until his radio telephone operator was killed in action during a clearing operation on Highway 13. Richardson moved into the position of platoon leader.

During a reconnaissance mission between Lộc Ninh and the Cambodian border on 14 September 1968, Richardson's unit was engaged by intense automatic weapons and small-arms fire from a well-entrenched North Vietnamese People's Army of Vietnam (PAVN) battalion. He maneuvered through a hail of hostile rounds and deployed his men into defensive positions while directing their suppressive fire. During the attack, he dragged three wounded soldiers back to safety.

With his platoon surrounded, Richardson realized the only way they would avoid being overrun was with accurate tactical air strikes. He made his way up Hill 222 (11.888°N 106.629°E) undetected to call in tactical air strikes from a shallow irrigation ditch with only rubber trees for cover. Once up the hill, he realized that the PAVN force was a large regimental base complex of the PAVN 7th Division. Speaking directly to the pilots, he began calling in the airstrikes. An hour in, he was shot in the right leg by a PAVN sniper. He continued guiding the pilots for seven more hours, calling in approximately 32 airstrikes until the PAVN retreated. His actions saved 85 lives.

Richardson was honorably discharged from active duty on 9 May 1969, and returned to Michigan. He worked in the construction and gas industry, married in 1971, and joined the Michigan National Guard in 1978 after a nine-year break in service. He became the post command sergeant major of the Camp Grayling Joint Maneuver Training Center. He retired from military service on 31 January 2008.

== Medal of Honor citation ==
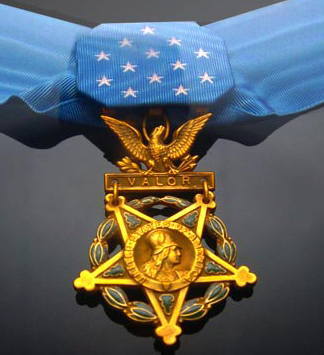

The President of the United States of America, authorized by Act of Congress March 3rd, 1863, has awarded in the name of Congress the Medal of Honor to

Then-Staff Sgt. Terry P. Richardson distinguished himself by acts of gallantry on Sept. 14, 1968, while serving with Company A, 1st Battalion, 28th Infantry, 1st Infantry Division, near Loc Ninh, Vietnam.

During a fierce battle for Hill 222, a piece of high ground just north of the Loc Ninh controlled by elements of the North Vietnamese 7th Division, Richardson’s company attempted to advance up the hill in tandem with several other companies from the 1st Infantry Division. During the assault, Richardson’s platoon became separated from the rest of the company and got pinned down by ferocious enemy fire which wounded three American soldiers.

Without hesitation, Richardson went to the aid of one soldier while he organized the withdrawal of his platoon. Moving three times through the hail of machine gun and rifle fire, Richardson rescued each of the wounded soldiers and then marked the nearest enemy machine gun bunkers with smoke grenades so they could be targeted by air strikes. His platoon rejoined the company and continued the attack, but it was still dangerously exposed on the lower slopes of the hill with enemy positions all around.

Realizing that his company and the other American units would find it nearly impossible to take the hill unless the main North Vietnamese bunkers were destroyed, Richardson picked up a radio and then sneaked up the hill to a shallow irrigation ditch from where he could direct air strikes. Getting on the radio, he began directing U.S. fighter bombers as they dropped their ordnance on enemy positions across Hill 222.

The irrigation ditch gave Richardson a degree of cover as the bombs exploded all around his position, but an hour into his targeting efforts a North Vietnamese shot his right leg. Ignoring the pain of the wound, Richardson remained on the radio for seven more hours as the battle raged around him. When the enemy withdrew from the hill later that day, he had directed no less than 32 air strikes and guided more than 75,000 pounds of ordnance onto enemy positions. His efforts proved instrumental in saving his company and breaking the North Vietnamese grip on Hill 222.

Richardson's extraordinary heroism and selflessness beyond the call of duty were in keeping with the highest traditions of military service and reflect great credit upon himself, his unit and the U.S. Army.

== Honors and awards ==
Richardson's personal decorations include the Bronze Star Medal, the Purple Heart, Air Medal and the Combat Infantryman Badge

Badge	Combat Infantryman Badge		
1st row	Medal of Honor		Legion of Merit with 1 Oak Leaf Cluster
2nd row	Bronze Star Medal	Purple Heart	Meritorious Service Medal with 1 silver Oak Leaf Cluster
3rd row	Air Medal	Army Commendation Medal with 2 Oak Leaf Clusters	Army Achievement Medal with 4 Oak Leaf Clusters
4th row	Reserve Components Achievement Medal with 1 silver and 3 bronze oak leaf clusters	National Defense Service Medal with 2 Campaign stars	Vietnam Service Medal with 4 Campaign stars
5th row	Global War on Terrorism Service Medal	Armed Forces Reserve Medal with silver Hourglass device	NCO Professional Development Ribbon
6th row	Army Service Ribbon	Army Reserve Components Overseas Training Ribbon with Numeral 3	Vietnam Campaign Medal

Unit awards	RVN Gallantry Cross Unit Citation with Palm	RVN Civil Actions Medal Unit Citation with Palm

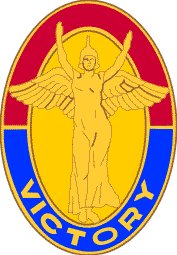

1st Infantry Division Distinctive unit insignia

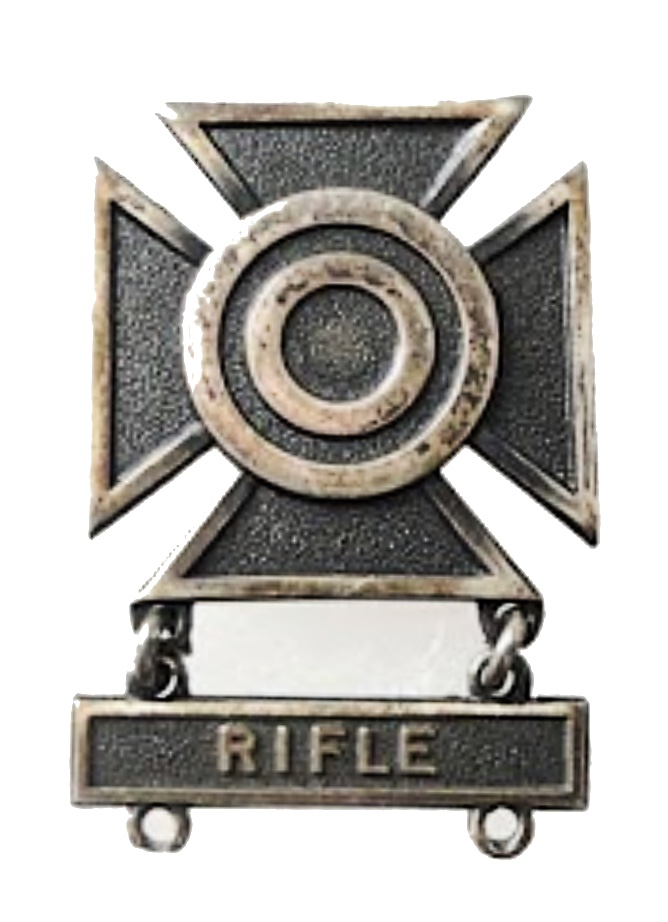

Sharpshooter Qualification Badge with "RIFLE" clasp

== See also ==
- List of Medal of Honor recipients for the Vietnam War
