= Port Huron and Northwestern Railway =

Defunct railroad in Michigan, US

The Port Huron and Northwestern Railway (PH&NW) Nicknamed "The Port Huron Road", is a defunct railway which operated in the Thumb area of Michigan during the late 1800s. The company was chartered by a group of Port Huron, Michigan businessmen on March 23, 1878, it opened its first line, Port Huron to Croswell, on May 12, 1879. The PH&NW's main line ran from Port Huron through Vassar to East Saginaw; this 91-mile (146 km) stretch opened on February 21, 1882. In addition the PH&NW operated three branch lines: Sand Beach, which was a continuation of the original Croswell line and ran up the Lake Huron coast; Port Austin, which split from "Sand Beach" at Palms and went through Bad Axe before reaching the northern tip of the Thumb; and Almont, which ran due west from Port Huron.

The Sand Beach branch opened completely on September 13, 1880, the Port Austin on December 11, 1882, and the Almont on October 3, 1882. The entire system, including the main line, was 3 ft (914 mm) narrow gauge.

On April 1, 1889, the Flint and Pere Marquette Railroad bought the PH&NW, which then ceased to exist as a separate company.
