= Coldwater Shale =

Geologic formation in Michigan, US

- Stratigraphic range: Mississippian
- Type: Formation
- Underlies: Marshall Sandstone and New Providence Shale
- Overlies: Sunbury Shale

Location
- Region: Indiana, Michigan, and Ohio
- Country: United States

The Coldwater Shale is a geologic formation in Michigan, named after the Coldwater River. It preserves fossils dating back to the Mississippian period.
