= Grand River Formation =

Fossil-bearing formation in Michigan

- Stratigraphic range: Pennsylvanian
- Type: Formation
- Underlies: Ionia Formation
- Overlies: Saginaw Formation

Location
- Region: Michigan
- Country: United States

The Grand River Formation is a geologic formation in Michigan. It preserves fossils dating back to the Pennsylvanian period.
