= Michigan Formation =

Geologic formation in Michigan, United States

- Stratigraphic range: Mississippian
- Type: Formation
- Underlies: Bayport Limestone
- Overlies: Marshall Sandstone

Location
- Region: Michigan
- Country: United States

The Michigan Formation is a geologic formation in the U.S. state of Michigan. It preserves fossils dating back to the Mississippian period.

Gypsum has been mined in Whittemore, Tawas City, Alabaster, and Grand Rapids from the Michigan formation--the only formation in the state making such mining commercially profitable. Gypsum has been mined in these varieties: gypsum, "alabaster", satin spar, and selenite.
