= Parma Sandstone =

Geologic formation in Michigan, United States

- Stratigraphic range: Mississippian-Pennsylvanian
- Type: Formation
- Underlies: Saginaw Formation
- Overlies: Bayport Limestone

Location
- Region: Michigan
- Country: United States

The Parma Sandstone is a geologic formation in Michigan. It preserves fossils dating back to the Carboniferous period.
