= Delaware Township, Michigan =

- Township
- Location within the state of Michigan Delaware Township, Michigan (the United States)
- Coordinates: 43°39′11″N 82°38′56″W
- Country: United States
- State: Michigan
- County: Sanilac

Area
  - Total: 46.6 sq mi (120.6 km^{2})
  - Land: 46.6 sq mi (120.6 km^{2})
  - Water: 0 sq mi (0.0 km^{2})
- Elevation: 738 ft (225 m)

Population (2020)
  - Total: 784
  - Density: 17/sq mi (6.5/km^{2})
- Time zone: UTC-5 (Eastern (EST))
  - Summer (DST): UTC-4 (EDT)
- ZIP codes: 48434 (Forestville), 48441 (Harbor Beach), 48456 Minden City), 48465 (Palms)
- FIPS code: 26-21380
- GNIS feature ID: 1626173
- Website: https://delawaretwpmi.gov/

Delaware Township is a civil township of Sanilac County in the U.S. state of Michigan. The population was 784 at the 2020 census.

== History ==
Delaware Township was organized in 1858.

- Forestville is a village in the township on M-25 along the Lake Huron shore. The Forestville ZIP code 48434 provides P.O. Box only service for a small portion of the township near the village.
- Charleston is a historical settlement in the township at 43°39′33″N 82°41′10″W. It was first settled about 1864 and called "Cato". A post office named "Charleston" was established in December 1872. The entire settlement, consisting of 21 buildings, was destroyed by the Thumb Fire in September 1881. The settlement was rebuilt but is today little more than a crossroads.

The postal delivery areas of some nearby communities also serve the township:

- Harbor Beach is a city to the north and the Harbor Beach ZIP code 48441 serves a small area in the township north of Forestville.
- Minden City is to the west and the Minden City ZIP code 48456 serves most of the northern portion of the township.
- Palms is an unincorporated community to the west and the Palms ZIP code 48465 serves most of the southern portion of the township.

== Geography ==
According to the United States Census Bureau, the township has a total area of 46.6 square miles (121 km^{2}), of which 46.6 square miles (121 km^{2}) is land and 0.02% is water.

== Demographics ==
Historical population
Census	Pop.	Note	%±
2000	930		—
2010	856		−8.0%
2020	784		−8.4%

As of the census of 2000, there were 930 people, 359 households, and 258 families residing in the township. The population density was 20.0 inhabitants per square mile (7.7/km^{2}). There were 643 housing units at an average density of 13.8 per square mile (5.3/km^{2}). The racial makeup of the township was 97.42% White, 0.22% Native American, 0.11% Asian, 0.32% from other races, and 1.94% from two or more races. Hispanic or Latino of any race were 2.47% of the population.

There were 359 households, out of which 29.5% had children under the age of 18 living with them, 64.1% were married couples living together, 5.0% had a female householder with no husband present, and 27.9% were non-families. 26.5% of all households were made up of individuals, and 14.2% had someone living alone who was 65 years of age or older. The average household size was 2.55 and the average family size was 3.09.

In the township the population was spread out, with 26.6% under the age of 18, 6.0% from 18 to 24, 23.9% from 25 to 44, 25.1% from 45 to 64, and 18.5% who were 65 years of age or older. The median age was 40 years. For every 100 females, there were 107.1 males. For every 100 females age 18 and over, there were 109.5 males.

The median income for a household in the township was $35,568, and the median income for a family was $42,083. Males had a median income of $27,303 versus $20,714 for females. The per capita income for the township was $15,451. About 8.3% of families and 11.4% of the population were below the poverty line, including 7.9% of those under age 18 and 14.9% of those age 65 or over.
