= Kingston, Michigan =

- Village
- Nickname: K-Town
- Location of Kingston, Michigan
- Coordinates: 43°24′49″N 83°11′12″W
- Country: United States
- State: Michigan
- County: Tuscola

Area
  - Total: 1.02 sq mi (2.64 km^{2})
  - Land: 1.02 sq mi (2.64 km^{2})
  - Water: 0 sq mi (0.00 km^{2})
- Elevation: 804 ft (245 m)

Population (2020)
  - Total: 399
  - Density: 391.5/sq mi (151.17/km^{2})
- Time zone: UTC-5 (Eastern (EST))
  - Summer (DST): UTC-4 (EDT)
- ZIP code: 48741
- Area code: 989
- FIPS code: 26-43380
- GNIS feature ID: 0629726

Kingston is a village in Tuscola County in the U.S. state of Michigan. As of the 2020 census, Kingston had a population of 399. The village is located at the southern edge of Kingston Township and is partially within Koylton Township.

== Geography ==
According to the United States Census Bureau, the village has a total area of 1.02 square miles (2.64 km^{2}), all land.

== Demographics ==
Historical population
Census	Pop.	Note	%±
1900	286		—
1910	302		5.6%
1920	321		6.3%
1930	331		3.1%
1940	314		−5.1%
1950	371		18.2%
1960	456		22.9%
1970	464		1.8%
1980	417		−10.1%
1990	439		5.3%
2000	450		2.5%
2010	440		−2.2%
2020	399		−9.3%
U.S. Decennial Census

=== 2010 census ===
As of the census of 2010, there were 440 people, 163 households, and 120 families living in the village. The population density was 431.4 inhabitants per square mile (166.6/km^{2}). There were 180 housing units at an average density of 176.5 per square mile (68.1/km^{2}). The racial makeup of the village was 96.1% White, 0.5% African American, 0.7% Native American, 0.7% from other races, and 2.0% from two or more races. Hispanic or Latino of any race were 3.6% of the population.

There were 163 households, of which 37.4% had children under the age of 45 living with them, 53.4% were married couples living together, 15.3% had a female householder with no husband present, 4.9% had a male householder with no wife present, and 26.4% were non-families. 20.9% of all households were made up of individuals, and 11.1% had someone living alone who was 65 years of age or older. The average household size was 2.70 and the average family size was 3.10.

The median age in the village was 35 years. 26.1% of residents were under the age of 18; 10.7% were between the ages of 18 and 24; 25.3% were from 25 to 44; 23.6% were from 45 to 64; and 14.3% were 65 years of age or older. The gender makeup of the village was 50.2% male and 49.8% female.

=== 2000 census ===
As of the census of 2000, there were 450 people, 169 households, and 124 families living in the village. The population density was 534.9 inhabitants per square mile (206.5/km^{2}). There were 182 housing units at an average density of 216.3 per square mile (83.5/km^{2}). The racial makeup of the village was 94.67% White, 0.67% African American, 0.22% Native American, 0.22% Asian, 0.89% from other races, and 3.33% from two or more races. Hispanic or Latino of any race were 2.44% of the population.

There were 169 households, out of which 37.9% had children under the age of 45 living with them, 56.2% were married couples living together, 15.4% had a female householder with no husband present (there is no percentage of male householder with no wife present listed), and 26.6% were non-families. 22.5% of all households were made up of individuals, and 15.4% had someone living alone who was 65 years of age or older. The average household size was 2.66 and the average family size was 3.07.

In the village, the population was spread out, with 30.2% under the age of 18, 8.9% from 18 to 24, 27.8% from 25 to 44, 20.2% from 45 to 64, and 12.9% who were 65 years of age or older. The median age was 35 years. For every 100 females, there were 89.9 males. For every 100 females age 18 and over, there were 82.6 males.

The median income for a household in the village was $32,813, and the median income for a family was $42,500. Males had a median income of $35,938 versus $20,750 for females. The per capita income for the village was $14,753. About 6.8% of families and 6.5% of the population were below the poverty line, including 7.4% of those under age 18 and 8.9% of those age 65 or over.

== Notable people ==
- Murray Van Wagoner (1898–1986), 38th Governor of Michigan
