= Saginaw Formation =

Geologic formation in Michigan, United States

- Stratigraphic range: Pennsylvanian
- Type: Formation
- Underlies: Grand River Formation
- Overlies: Parma Sandstone

Location
- Region: Michigan
- Country: United States

The Saginaw Formation is a geologic formation in Michigan. It preserves fossils dating back to the Pennsylvanian period.
