= Bayport Limestone =

Geologic formation in Michigan, United States

- Stratigraphic range: Mississippian
- Type: Formation
- Underlies: Parma Sandstone
- Overlies: Michigan Formation

Location
- Region: Michigan
- Country: United States

The Bayport Limestone is a geologic formation in Michigan. It preserves fossils dating back to the Mississippian period.
