= Elkland Township, Michigan =

- Township
- Location within the state of Michigan
- Coordinates: 43°36′43″N 83°10′44″W
- Country: United States
- State: Michigan
- County: Tuscola

Area
  - Total: 35.6 sq mi (92.2 km^{2})
  - Land: 35.6 sq mi (92.2 km^{2})
  - Water: 0 sq mi (0.0 km^{2})
- Elevation: 771 ft (235 m)

Population (2020)
  - Total: 3,532
  - Density: 99.2/sq mi (38.3/km^{2})
- Time zone: UTC-5 (Eastern (EST))
  - Summer (DST): UTC-4 (EDT)
- FIPS code: 26-25300
- GNIS feature ID: 1626226
- Website: https://www.elklandtownship.org/

Elkland Township is a civil township of Tuscola County in the U.S. state of Michigan. The population was 3,532 at the 2020 census.

The village of Cass City is located within the southern part of the township.

== Geography ==
According to the United States Census Bureau, the township has a total area of 35.6 square miles (92 km^{2}), all land.

== Demographics ==
As of the census of 2000, there were 3,659 people, 1,479 households, and 1,004 families residing in the township. The population density was 102.8 inhabitants per square mile (39.7/km^{2}). There were 1,561 housing units at an average density of 43.9 per square mile (16.9/km^{2}). The racial makeup of the township was 97.81% White, 0.25% African American, 0.85% Native American, 0.44% Asian, 0.16% from other races, and 0.49% from two or more races. Hispanic or Latino of any race were 1.09% of the population.

There were 1,479 households, out of which 30.0% had children under the age of 18 living with them, 53.4% were married couples living together, 11.2% had a female householder with no husband present, and 32.1% were non-families. 29.0% of all households were made up of individuals, and 14.9% had someone living alone who was 65 years of age or older. The average household size was 2.41 and the average family size was 2.96.

In the township the population was spread out, with 24.6% under the age of 18, 8.4% from 18 to 24, 25.6% from 25 to 44, 22.1% from 45 to 64, and 19.4% who were 65 years of age or older. The median age was 39 years. For every 100 females, there were 91.3 males. For every 100 females age 18 and over, there were 84.8 males.

The median income for a household in the township was $33,532, and the median income for a family was $41,053. Males had a median income of $31,840 versus $25,268 for females. The per capita income for the township was $16,837. About 9.5% of families and 11.0% of the population were below the poverty line, including 15.1% of those under age 18 and 10.7% of those age 65 or over.
