= Grant Township, Huron County, Michigan =

Grant Township, Michigan
- Civil township
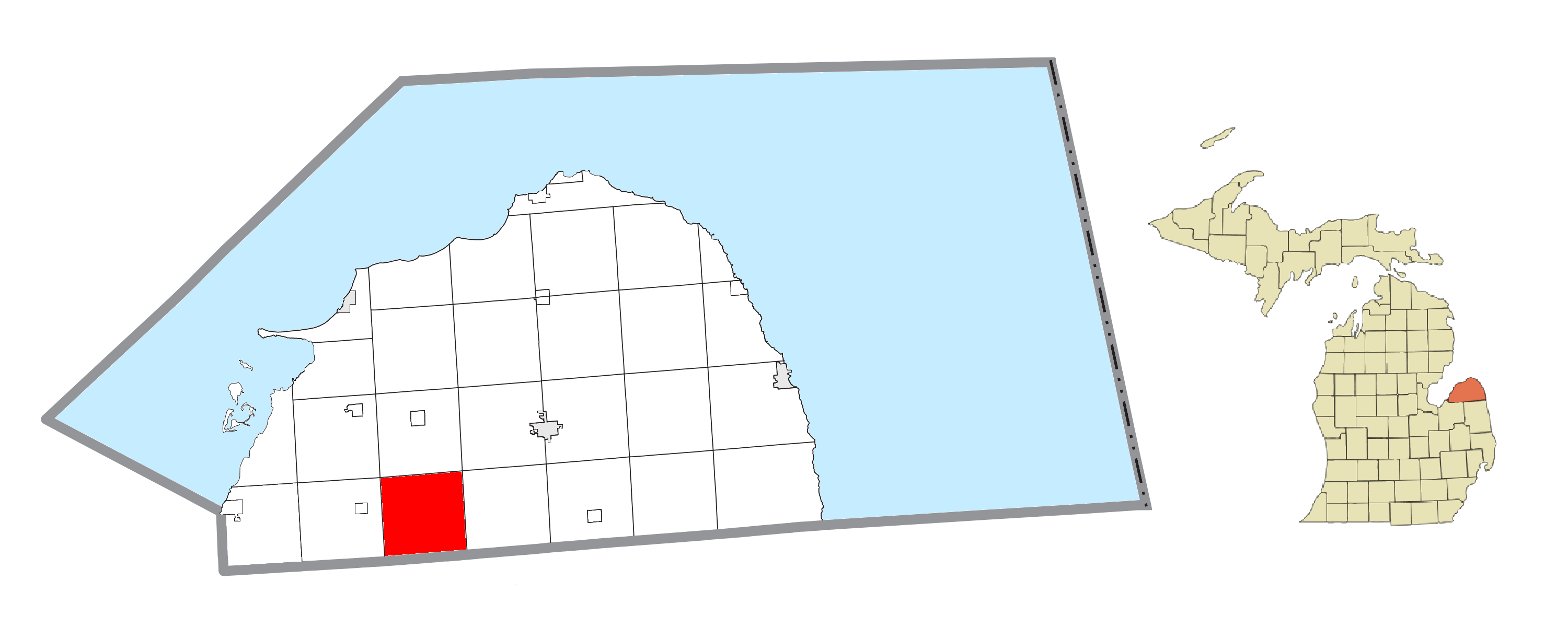
- Location within Huron County

- Location within the state of Michigan Grant Township (the United States)
- Coordinates: 43°43′25″N 83°10′54″W
- Country: United States
- State: Michigan
- County: Huron
- Established: 1867

Area
  - Total: 35.5 sq mi (91.9 km^{2})
  - Land: 35.4 sq mi (91.8 km^{2})
  - Water: 0.039 sq mi (0.1 km^{2})
- Elevation: 725 ft (221 m)

Population (2020)
  - Total: 869
  - Density: 24.5/sq mi (9.47/km^{2})
- Time zone: UTC-5 (Eastern (EST))
  - Summer (DST): UTC-4 (EDT)
- ZIP code(s): 48726, 48731, 48735, 48754
- Area code: 989
- FIPS code: 26-34260
- GNIS feature ID: 1626379

Grant Township is a civil township of Huron County in the U.S. state of Michigan. As of the 2020 census, the township population was 869.

== History ==
Grant Township was established in 1867.

== Geography ==
According to the United States Census Bureau, the township has a total area of 35.5 square miles (92 km^{2}), of which 35.4 square miles (92 km^{2}) is land and 0.1 square miles (0.26 km^{2}) (0.14%) is water.

== Demographics ==
As of the census of 2000, there were 833 people, 307 households, and 237 families residing in the township. The population density was 23.5 inhabitants per square mile (9.1/km^{2}). There were 334 housing units at an average density of 9.4 per square mile (3.6/km^{2}). The racial makeup of the township was 96.04% White, 1.32% African American, 0.12% Native American, 0.24% Asian, 0.24% from other races, and 2.04% from two or more races. Hispanic or Latino of any race were 1.32% of the population.

There were 307 households, out of which 35.5% had children under the age of 18 living with them, 65.1% were married couples living together, 6.5% had a female householder with no husband present, and 22.8% were non-families. 19.5% of all households were made up of individuals, and 8.1% had someone living alone who was 65 years of age or older. The average household size was 2.69 and the average family size was 3.06.

In the township the population was spread out, with 29.1% under the age of 18, 6.5% from 18 to 24, 27.9% from 25 to 44, 24.6% from 45 to 64, and 12.0% who were 65 years of age or older. The median age was 35 years. For every 100 females, there were 115.2 males. For every 100 females age 18 and over, there were 109.6 males.

The median income for a household in the township was $40,536, and the median income for a family was $43,750. Males had a median income of $31,450 versus $21,528 for females. The per capita income for the township was $17,615. About 5.5% of families and 10.3% of the population were below the poverty line, including 11.8% of those under age 18 and 11.4% of those age 65 or over.
