= Minden City, Michigan =

- Village
- Nickname: "Minden"
- Location of Minden City, Michigan
- Coordinates: 43°40′16″N 82°46′27″W
- Country: United States
- State: Michigan
- County: Sanilac

Government
  - Village President: Allen M Pierson

Area
  - Total: 0.99 sq mi (2.56 km^{2})
  - Land: 0.98 sq mi (2.55 km^{2})
  - Water: 0.0039 sq mi (0.01 km^{2})
- Elevation: 846 ft (258 m)

Population (2020)
  - Total: 165
  - Density: 167.4/sq mi (64.64/km^{2})
- Time zone: UTC-5 (Eastern (EST))
  - Summer (DST): UTC-4 (EDT)
- ZIP codes: 48456, 48465
- Area code: 989
- FIPS code: 26-54560
- GNIS feature ID: 0632443

Minden City is a village in Sanilac County of the U.S. state of Michigan. The population was 165 at the 2020 census. The village is located within Minden Township. It has possessed a post office since 1862 (named Minden until 1883).

== Geography ==
According to the United States Census Bureau, the village has a total area of 1.10 square miles (2.85 km^{2}), all land.

== Demographics ==
Historical population
Census	Pop.	Note	%±
1880	191		—
1890	394		106.3%
1900	408		3.6%
1910	332		−18.6%
1920	283		−14.8%
1930	277		−2.1%
1940	321		15.9%
1950	359		11.8%
1960	369		2.8%
1970	327		−11.4%
1980	284		−13.1%
1990	233		−18.0%
2000	242		3.9%
2010	197		−18.6%
2020	165		−16.2%
U.S. Decennial Census

=== 2010 census ===
As of the census of 2010, there were 197 people, 81 households, and 52 families living in the village. The population density was 179.1 inhabitants per square mile (69.2/km^{2}). There were 102 housing units at an average density of 92.7 per square mile (35.8/km^{2}). The racial makeup of the village was 95.4% White, 0.5% Native American, 0.5% Asian, 1.5% from other races, and 2.0% from two or more races. Hispanic or Latino of any race were 1.5% of the population.

There were 81 households, of which 28.4% had children under the age of 18 living with them, 46.9% were married couples living together, 16.0% had a female householder with no husband present, 1.2% had a male householder with no wife present, and 35.8% were non-families. 29.6% of all households were made up of individuals, and 14.8% had someone living alone who was 65 years of age or older. The average household size was 2.43 and the average family size was 3.00.

The median age in the village was 41.5 years. 21.3% of residents were under the age of 18; 8.2% were between the ages of 18 and 24; 26.9% were from 25 to 44; 31.4% were from 45 to 64; and 12.2% were 65 years of age or older. The gender makeup of the village was 47.7% male and 52.3% female.

=== 2000 census ===
As of the census of 2000, there were 242 people, 96 households, and 67 families living in the village. The population density was 216.5 inhabitants per square mile (83.6/km^{2}). There were 111 housing units at an average density of 99.3 per square mile (38.3/km^{2}). The racial makeup of the village was 99.17% White, and 0.83% from two or more races. Hispanic or Latino of any race were 1.24% of the population.

There were 96 households, out of which 31.3% had children under the age of 18 living with them, 47.9% were married couples living together, 17.7% had a female householder with no husband present, and 30.2% were non-families. 27.1% of all households were made up of individuals, and 16.7% had someone living alone who was 65 years of age or older. The average household size was 2.52 and the average family size was 2.91.

In the village, the population was spread out, with 24.8% under the age of 18, 11.6% from 18 to 24, 28.9% from 25 to 44, 17.8% from 45 to 64, and 16.9% who were 65 years of age or older. The median age was 34 years. For every 100 females, there were 80.6 males. For every 100 females age 18 and over, there were 83.8 males.

The median income for a household in the village was $24,375, and the median income for a family was $35,625. Males had a median income of $32,917 versus $18,500 for females. The per capita income for the village was $14,980. About 9.1% of families and 16.9% of the population were below the poverty line, including 19.1% of those under the age of eighteen and 25.6% of those 65 or over.
