= Kingston Township, Michigan =

- Township
- Location within the state of Michigan
- Coordinates: 43°26′57″N 83°10′33″W
- Country: United States
- State: Michigan
- County: Tuscola

Area
  - Total: 35.9 sq mi (92.9 km^{2})
  - Land: 35.9 sq mi (92.9 km^{2})
  - Water: 0 sq mi (0.0 km^{2})
- Elevation: 778 ft (237 m)

Population (2020)
  - Total: 1,476
  - Density: 41.1/sq mi (15.9/km^{2})
- Time zone: UTC-5 (Eastern (EST))
  - Summer (DST): UTC-4 (EDT)
- ZIP code: 48729 (Deford), 48741 (Kingston)
- Area code: 989
- FIPS code: 26-43400
- GNIS feature ID: 1626562
- Website: https://www.kingstontwpmi.org/

Kingston Township is a civil township of Tuscola County in the U.S. state of Michigan. The population was 1,476 at the 2020 census.

== Communities ==
- The village of Kingston is located at the southern edge of the township and is partially within the township. The Kingston post office, with ZIP code 48741, also serves the southern portion of Kingston Township.
- The community of Deford is to the north in Novesta Township, and the Deford post office, with ZIP code 48729, also serves the northern portion of Kingston Township.
- Wilmot is an unincorporated community in the township at 43°27′50″N 83°11′25″W. Wilmot was a station stop on the Pontiac, Oxford & Northern (PO&N) railroad line. Later, the Detroit, Bay City & Western railroad came through and crossed the PO&N here. A plat was recorded in 1883 and a post office operated from November 26, 1883, until March 31, 1943.

== Geography ==
According to the United States Census Bureau, the township has a total area of 35.9 square miles (93 km^{2}), all land.

== Demographics ==
As of the census of 2000, there were 1,615 people, 578 households, and 453 families residing in the township. The population density was 45.0 inhabitants per square mile (17.4/km^{2}). There were 645 housing units at an average density of 18.0 per square mile (6.9/km^{2}). The racial makeup of the township was 96.47% White, 0.19% African American, 0.43% Native American, 0.06% Asian, 0.68% from other races, and 2.17% from two or more races. Hispanic or Latino of any race were 1.86% of the population.

There were 578 households, out of which 35.8% had children under the age of 18 living with them, 62.6% were married couples living together, 10.4% had a female householder with no husband present, and 21.6% were non-families. 17.6% of all households were made up of individuals, and 9.5% had someone living alone who was 65 years of age or older. The average household size was 2.79 and the average family size was 3.08.

In the township the population was spread out, with 28.9% under the age of 18, 8.4% from 18 to 24, 28.3% from 25 to 44, 23.2% from 45 to 64, and 11.3% who were 65 years of age or older. The median age was 36 years. For every 100 females, there were 101.9 males. For every 100 females age 18 and over, there were 95.4 males.

The median income for a household in the township was $40,000, and the median income for a family was $42,813. Males had a median income of $35,238 versus $21,600 for females. The per capita income for the township was $16,804. About 4.4% of families and 5.7% of the population were below the poverty line, including 4.3% of those under age 18 and 6.4% of those age 65 or over.
