= Greenleaf Township, Michigan =

- Township
- Location within the state of Michigan Greenleaf Township, Michigan (the United States)
- Coordinates: 43°38′0″N 83°3′39″W
- Country: United States
- State: Michigan
- County: Sanilac

Area
  - Total: 35.9 sq mi (93.0 km^{2})
  - Land: 35.9 sq mi (92.9 km^{2})
  - Water: 0 sq mi (0.0 km^{2})
- Elevation: 738 ft (225 m)

Population (2020)
  - Total: 815
  - Density: 22.7/sq mi (8.77/km^{2})
- Time zone: UTC-5 (Eastern (EST))
  - Summer (DST): UTC-4 (EDT)
- FIPS code: 26-35020
- GNIS feature ID: 1626399
- Website: https://www.greenleaftownship.org/

Greenleaf Township is a civil township of Sanilac County in the U.S. state of Michigan. As of the 2020 census, the township population was 815.

== Communities ==
Unincorporated communities in the township are:

- New Greenleaf is located at Hadley Road and Bay City Forestville Road.
- Wickware is located at Cass City and Leslie Roads.

== History ==
On October 31, 1882, Wickware Post Office was opened. Greenleaf Post Office began operations on March 6, 1886 at New Greenleaf. Greenleaf and Wickware Post Office were closed on June 13, 1906 and June 30, 1906 respectively.

== Geography ==
According to the United States Census Bureau, the township has a total area of 35.9 square miles (93 km^{2}), of which 35.9 square miles (93 km^{2}) is land and 0.03% is water.

The South Fork of the Cass River flows into the North Branch in the township; Sanilac Petroglyphs Historic State Park is nearby.

== Demographics ==
As of the census of 2000, there were 804 people, 276 households, and 218 families residing in the township. The population density was 22.4 inhabitants per square mile (8.6/km^{2}). There were 317 housing units at an average density of 8.8 per square mile (3.4/km^{2}). The racial makeup of the township was 98.63% White, 0.37% Asian, 0.12% from other races, and 0.87% from two or more races. Hispanic or Latino of any race were 1.00% of the population.

There were 276 households, out of which 38.0% had children under the age of 18 living with them, 70.7% were married couples living together, 4.7% had a female householder with no husband present, and 20.7% were non-families. 18.5% of all households were made up of individuals, and 6.9% had someone living alone who was 65 years of age or older. The average household size was 2.89 and the average family size was 3.27.

In the township the population was spread out, with 29.7% under the age of 18, 7.2% from 18 to 24, 28.7% from 25 to 44, 21.9% from 45 to 64, and 12.4% who were 65 years of age or older. The median age was 37 years. For every 100 females, there were 110.5 males. For every 100 females age 18 and over, there were 101.8 males.

The median income for a household in the township was $34,643, and the median income for a family was $37,679. Males had a median income of $30,000 versus $22,321 for females. The per capita income for the township was $14,067. About 11.7% of families and 13.9% of the population were below the poverty line, including 19.0% of those under age 18 and 11.7% of those age 65 or over.
