= M-31 (Michigan highway) =

Former state highway in Michigan, United States

M-31
- M-31 highlighted in red on a modern map

Route information
- Maintained by MDOT
- Length: 166.910 mi (268.616 km)
- Existed: c. July 1, 1919–c. November 11, 1926

Major junctions
- South end: M-21 in Port Huron
- M-19 in Bad Axe
- North end: M-10 in Saginaw

Location
- Country: United States
- State: Michigan
- Counties: St. Clair, Sanilac, Huron, Tuscola, Bay, Saginaw

Highway system
- Michigan State Trunkline Highway System; Interstate; US; State; Byways
← Bus. US 31	→ M-32

M-31 was a state trunkline highway in the Lower Peninsula in the US state of Michigan. It generally ran north from Port Huron along the Lake Huron shoreline through The Thumb region before turning inland. The highway crossed The Thumb and then ran along the Saginaw Bay shoreline before running inland again, terminating at Saginaw. It was one of the original state highways signposted in 1919, but it was renumbered as other highways in 1926, decommissioning the designation in the process. Parts of its route are now M-24, M-25, M-81 and M-142.

== Route description ==
M-31 started at M-21 in Port Huron and ran northward along the Lake Huron shoreline. Along the way, it intersected the western terminus of M-46 before reaching Harbor Beach. In town, the original M-27 merged in from the north, and M-27/M-31 ran concurrently westward, turning inland. The two highways separated north of Ruth as M-27 turned southward. M-31 continued across The Thumb through Bad Axe, where it ran concurrently with M-19 in town. The highway carried on westward through Elkton and Pigeon to Bay Port. Once there, the trunkline turned southwesterly to follow along part of the Saginaw Bay. The road passed through Sebewaing to Unionville before turning back inland. Running southward to Akron, the highway turned alternately westward and southward to Fairgrove. M-31 next ran west along Bradleyville Road to a connection with M-81; the two highways ran concurrently south through Gilford before M-31 separated and turned back westward through Reese to Saginaw. The northern terminus in downtown Saginaw was at an intersection with what was then M-10.

== History ==
When the state highway system was first signed in 1919, M-31 was one of the original trunklines, originally running northward from Port Huron to Harbor Beach and then westward to Saginaw. When the U.S. Highway System was approved on November 11, 1926, M-31 was decommissioned in favor of alternate numbers. From Port Huron north to Harbor Beach, M-29 was extended as a replacement. The segment west to Bay Port was renumbered M-83 while from Bad Axe west it was also additionally part of M-29 to Unionville. The remainder was numbered M-84 from Unionville to Reese, and M-81 from Reese to Saginaw.

== Major intersections ==
County	Location	mi	km	Destinations	Notes
St. Clair	Port Huron	0.000	0.000	M-19 south – Detroit M-19 north / M-21 west – Flint	
St. Clair	Port Huron	4.149	6.677	M-27 – Fort Gratiot	Southern terminus of original M-27
Sanilac	Port Sanilac	33.486	53.890	M-46 – Sandusky	Eastern terminus of M-46
Huron	Harbor Beach	62.990	101.373	M-27 north – Port Austin	Eastern end of M-27 concurrency
Huron	Sand Beach Township	67.853	109.199	M-27 south	Western end of M-27 concurrency
Huron	Bad Axe	77.934	125.423	M-19 south – Sandusky	Eastern end of M-19 concurrency
Huron	Bad Axe	80.910	130.212	M-53 south – Cass City	Northern terminus of M-53
Huron	Verona Township–Colfax Township line	82.400	132.610	M-19 north – Port Austin	Western end of M-19 concurrency
Tuscola	Gilford Township	147.270	237.008	M-81 north	Northern end of M-81 concurrency
Tuscola	Denmark Township	152.238	245.003	M-81 south	Southern end of M-81 concurrency
Bay	Saginaw	166.910	268.616	M-10 – Flint, Bay City	
1.000 mi = 1.609 km; 1.000 km = 0.621 mi: Concurrency terminus
