= M-83 (Michigan highway) =

State highway in Saginaw County, Michigan, United States

M-83
- M-83 highlighted in red

Route information
- Maintained by MDOT
- Length: 14.672 mi (23.612 km)
- Existed: 1929–present

Major junctions
- South end: I-75 / US 23 at Birch Run
- M-46 near Frankentrost
- North end: M-15 near Richville

Location
- Country: United States
- State: Michigan
- Counties: Saginaw

Highway system
- Michigan State Trunkline Highway System; Interstate; US; State; Byways
| ← M-82 | → M-84 |

M-83 is a north–south state trunkline highway in the Lower Peninsula of the US state of Michigan primarily serving as a link between Interstate 75/US Highway 23 (I-75/US 23) in Birch Run, including a short east–west section with M-54, and the Bavarian-themed town of Frankenmuth. M-83 is primarily a north–south trunkline that passes by such landmarks as Bronner's Christmas Wonderland, Zehnder's and the Bavarian Inn before leaving town. The landscape in the remainder of the area is composed of farm fields between Frankenmuth and the northern terminus at M-15 near Richville.

Previously, the M-83 designation was used for a highway in the Upper Peninsula between 1919 and 1926. Immediately after that, the moniker was used to supplant the M-31 designation in The Thumb area. A disconnected segment of highway was given the M-83 name in 1929 in the Frankenmuth area. The gap between the two roads was eliminated within a year. By the end of the 1930s, the highway was truncated to its current northern terminus in the Richville area, removing The Thumb area segments. The last changes rerouted the southern end to connect with I-75 after that freeway was opened in 1962.

== Route description ==
M-83 starts at exit 136 along I-75/US 23 just north of the outlet mall in Birch Run; this interchange is also the northern terminus of M-54. The two highways run concurrently east from the freeway along Birch Run Road, crossing Dixie Highway. The landscape away from the freeway is predominantly fields through the area. Traveling eastward along this roadway, a motorist is on either northbound M-83 or southbound M-54, making these two miles (3.2 km) a wrong-way concurrency. At the intersection with Gera Road, the two trunklines diverge when M-54 turns southward. From here, M-83 turns due north for about four miles (6.4 km) into Frankenmuth.

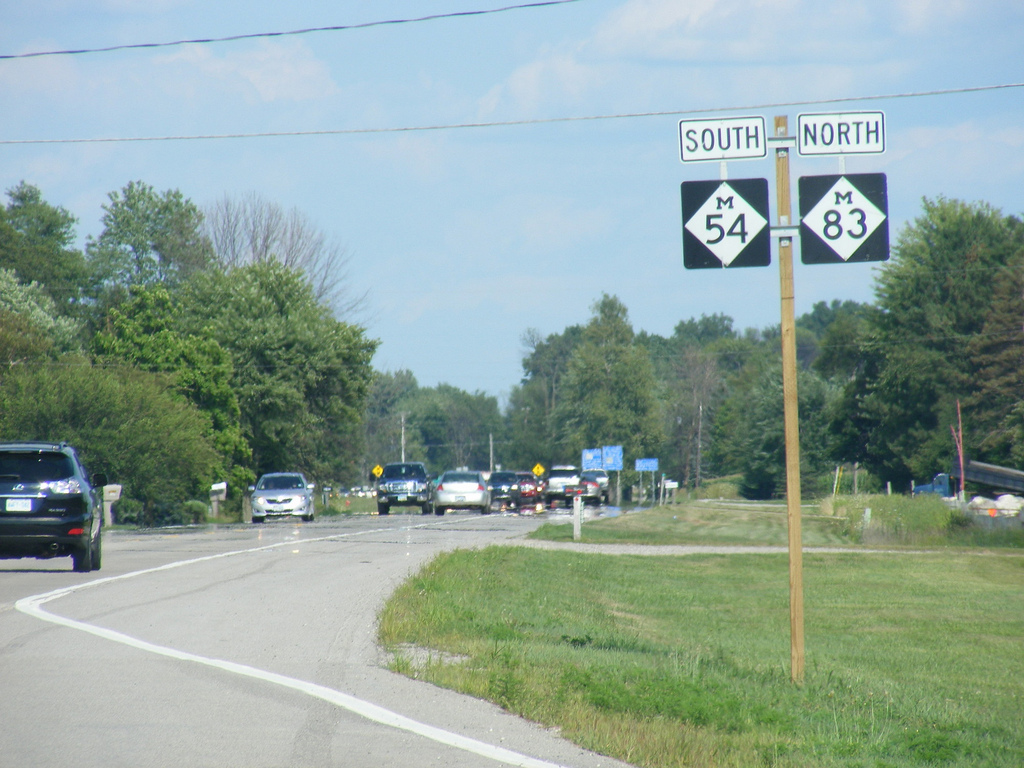
Wrong-way concurrency along Birch Run Road

The trunkline curves to the northwest around Bronner's Christmas Wonderland, which bills itself as the "World's Largest Christmas Store"; the store has 7 acres (2.8 ha) under one roof devoted to Christmas merchandise. Further north, M-83 follows Main Street over the Cass River into downtown Frankenmuth. North of the river are Zehnder's and the Bavarian Inn, restaurants known for their "world famous" chicken dinners. The city is known as "Michigan's Little Bavaria"; the area was settled by German Lutherans in the 19th century. Today, buildings and even road signs are erected in the Bavarian theme.

North of downtown, the highway passes through a commercial area and out of the city. The landscape returns to farm fields as M-83 follows Gera Road due north again. The highway passes through the community of Gera and crosses a line of the Huron and Eastern Railway. North of the railroad, the trunkline intersects M-46 (Holland Road). After this intersection, M-83 continues about a mile and a half (2.4 km) and ends at a four-way intersection with M-15 (Vassar Road) near Richville while Gera Road continues as a county road.

M-83 is maintained by the Michigan Department of Transportation (MDOT) like other state highways in Michigan. As a part of these maintenance responsibilities, the department tracks the volume of traffic that uses the roadways under its jurisdiction. These volumes are expressed using a metric called annual average daily traffic, which is a statistical calculation of the average daily number of vehicles on a segment of roadway. MDOT's surveys in 2011 showed that the highest traffic level along M-83 was 17,240 vehicles daily between the I-75/US 23 interchange and Dixie Highway in Birch Run; the lowest count was 2,316 vehicles per day at the northern terminus. No section of M-83 has been listed on the National Highway System, a network of roads important to the country's economy, defense, and mobility.

== History ==
=== Previous designation ===
The first designation of M-83 was in place by July 1, 1919, for a routing along the Mohawk–Gay Road between the communities of the same name in Keweenaw County in the Upper Peninsula. This designation lasted until late 1926 when it was replaced by a northerly extension of M-26. The second designation of M-83 replaced M-31 across The Thumb between Bay Port and Harbor Beach, along what is today M-142.

=== Current designation ===
The current designation was assigned in 1929 as a second, disconnected section of highway. This new routing ran from US 10/US 23 in Clio by way of Frankenmuth to Reese. The gap between the two sections was filled in a year later when M-84 in Tuscola County was redesignated as part of M-83. After this change, M-83 continued north from Reese through Gilford and Akron to Unionville. There it ran concurrently along M-29 to Bay Port, connecting the two segments.

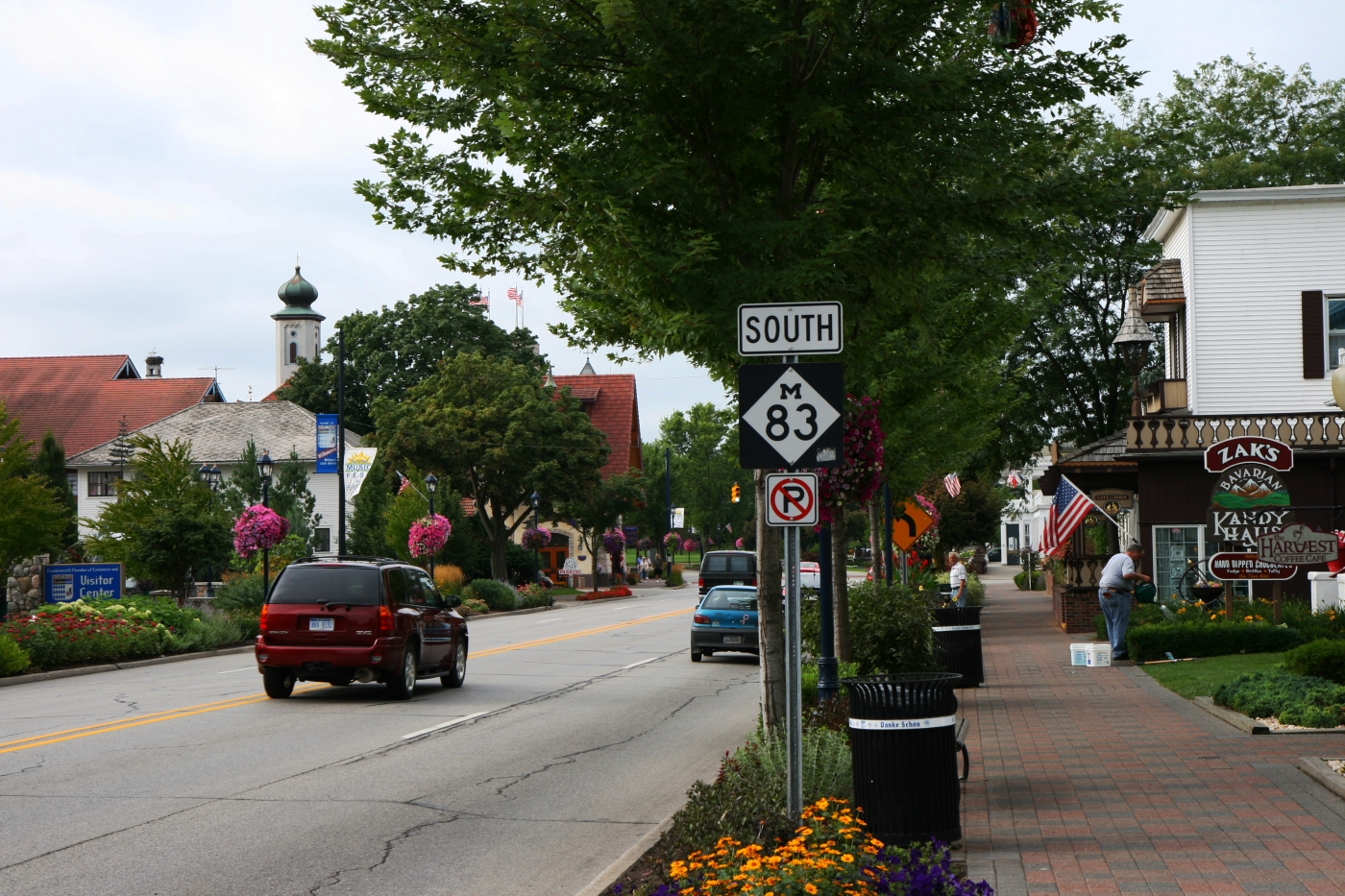
M-83 southbound in Frankenmuth

The eastern segment first designated in 1926 was separated from the rest of the highway in 1939. The northern end was scaled back to M-15/M-24 in Saginaw County. The concurrency along M-81 was removed, the section northeast to Gilford was transferred to local control, and the section northeast of Gilford to Unionville was added to M-138. The Bay Port—Harbor Beach section was redesignated M-142. The last changes came around 1962 when the I-75/US 10/US 23 freeway was completed between Pontiac and Flint. M-83 was rerouted on its south end to turn west along Birch Run Road to the freeway, concurrent with the new M-54, which replaced M-83 south of Birch Run Road.

== Major intersections ==
The entire highway is in Saginaw County.

| Location | mi | km | Destinations | Notes |
|---|---|---|---|---|
| Birch Run | 0.000 | 0.000 | I-75 / US 23 – Saginaw, Flint M-54 south | Southern terminus concurrent with M-54 northern terminus at exit 136 on I-75/US 23 |
| Birch Run Township | 2.094 | 3.370 | M-54 south – Flint | Eastern end of M-54 wrong-way concurrency |
| Blumfield Township | 13.045 | 20.994 | M-46 – Saginaw, Sandusky | |
| Blumfield Township | 14.672 | 23.612 | M-15 – Bay City, Pontiac | |
1.000 mi = 1.609 km; 1.000 km = 0.621 mi: Concurrency terminus
