= Reese Public School District =

School district in Michigan

Address
- 1696 Van Buren Road Reese, Tuscola County, Michigan, 48757; United States

District information
- Grades: PreKindergarten–12
- Superintendent: Jordan Ackerman
- Schools: 3
- Budget: $11,325,000 2022-2023 expenditures
- NCES District ID: 2629520

Students and staff
- Students: 746 (2024-2025)
- Teachers: 41.16 (on an FTE basis) (2024-2025)
- Staff: 145.43 FTE (2024-2025)
- Student–teacher ratio: 18.12 (2024-2025)
- District mascot: Rockets

Other information
- Website: www.reese.k12.mi.us

Reese Public School District is a public school district in the Saginaw, Michigan area. In Tuscola County, it serves Reese and parts of the townships of Denmark, Fairgrove, Gilford, and Juniata. In Bay County, it serves part of Merritt Township. In Saginaw County, it serves Robin Glen-Indiantown and parts of the townships of Blumfield and Buena Vista.

== History ==
A school was built in Reese around 1918, but was overcrowded by the 1950s and a new school was proposed. A new high school and an elementary school were built around 1958 on the same site, and the elementary school remains in use.

The current Reese Middle/High School opened in fall 1976. Both the high school and the elementary schools were designed by architecture firm Wigen, Ticknell & Associates of Saginaw.

== Schools ==
Schools in Reese Public School District
School	Address	Notes
Reese Middle/High School	1696 Van Buren, Reese	Grades 6–12.
Reese Elementary	9535 Center Street, Reese	Grades PreK-5.
