= M-15 (Michigan highway) =

State highway in Michigan, United States

M-15
- M-15 highlighted in red

Route information
- Maintained by MDOT
- Length: 73.664 mi (118.551 km)
- Existed: c. 1927–present
- Tourist routes: Pathway to Family Fun Recreational Heritage Route

Major junctions
- South end: US 24 near Clarkston
- I-75 at Clarkston; I-69 near Davison; M-57 near Otisville; M-46 near Reese
- North end: M-25 in Bay City

Location
- Country: United States
- State: Michigan
- Counties: Oakland, Genesee, Tuscola, Saginaw, Bay

Highway system
- Michigan State Trunkline Highway System; Interstate; US; State; Byways
← M-14	→ US 16

M-15 is a north–south state trunkline highway in the US state of Michigan. The southern terminus is a junction with US Highway 24 (US 24) just south of Clarkston on the northwestern edge of the Detroit metropolitan area. The trunkline is a recreational route running north and northwest to the Tri-Cities area. The northern terminus is the junction with M-25 on the east side of Bay City. The total length is about 73 2/3 miles (118.6 km) between the two regions.

The original M-15 designation was used in the northern half of the state in 1919. This designation was wholly replaced by the US 41 on November 11, 1926. This previous designation contained the section of highway in Marquette County that is home to the first painted highway centerline in the nation. Another section in western Marquette County included the first bridge built by the state of Michigan. Within the next year after M-15 was replaced by US 41, the designation was reused for a new highway routing along the current highway. This current highway was extended northerly to eventually end at Interstate 75 (I-75) in Bay City, before it was scaled back slightly to end in eastern Bay City. A proposed, but unbuilt, extension around the west side of Metro Detroit later became part of the I-275 corridor.

This highway is now a part of the Pure Michigan Byway System, but none of it is located on the National Highway System. A section of the two-lane highway has the local moniker, "Death Alley", where the local sheriff says the highway is poorly designed. The stretch of highway in Genesee County has been the location of 14 traffic fatalities between 2004 and 2009 as reported by The Flint Journal, including that of a 14-year-old local girl.

== Route description ==
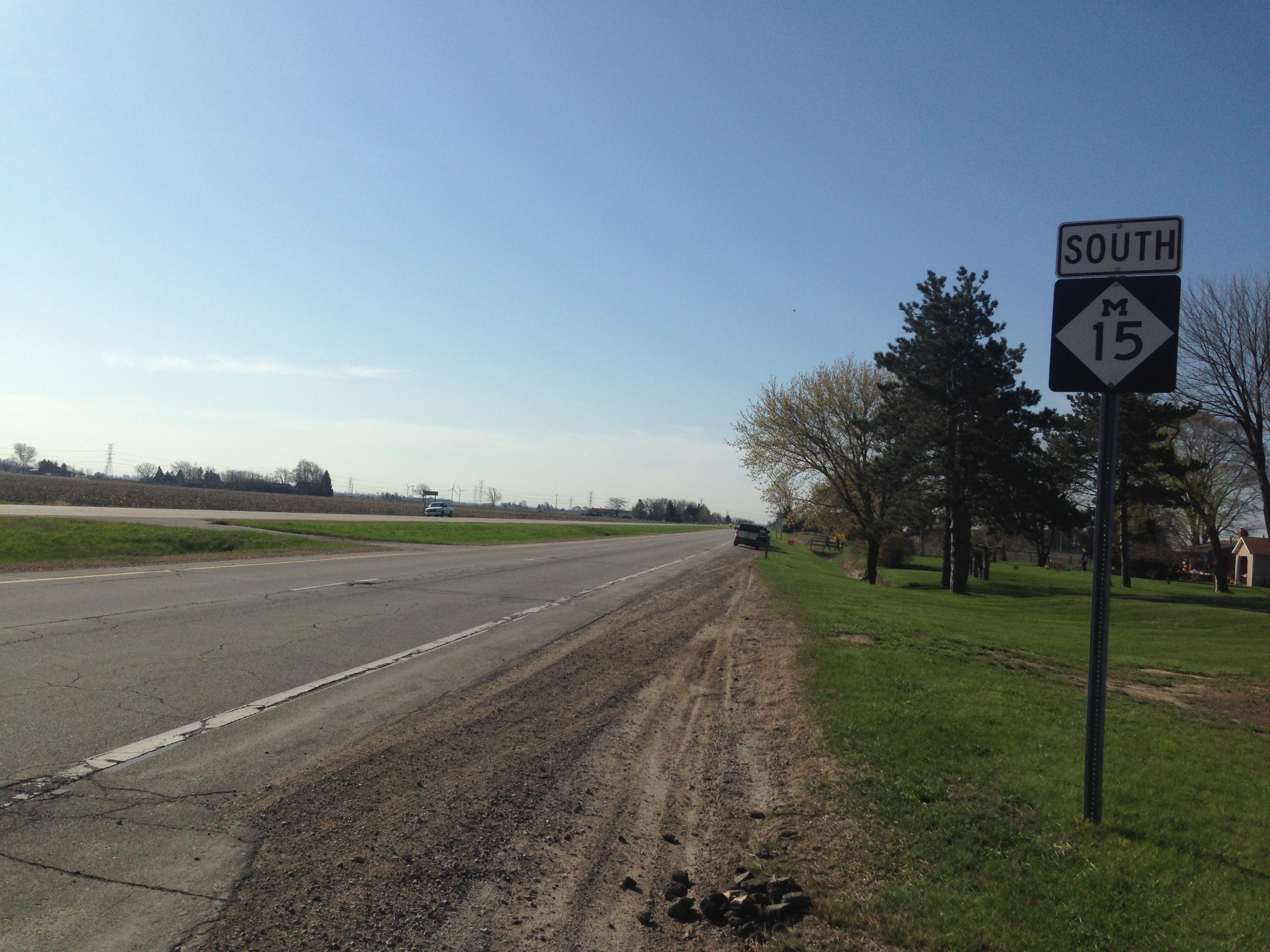
M-15 in Merritt Township, looking southbound

M-15 runs through mostly rural agricultural communities of The Thumb connecting the northern edge of Metro Detroit with the Tri-Cities area. It starts at a junction south of the village of Clarkston in northern Oakland County. The highway runs north along Ortonville Road from the intersection with US 24 (Dixie Highway) near Deer and Middle lakes through Clarkston. Continuing through town on Main Street near Parke Lake, it comes to an interchange with I-75 north of the village next to Little Walters Lake. South of Ortonville near Lake Louise and Bald Eagle Lake, M-15 turns northwest between the two lakes. The trunkline becomes State Road at the county line and turns north again near Shinanguag Lake near the Ortonville State Recreation Area outside Goodrich in southeastern Genesee County. South of Davison, M-15 intersects I-69 near the Davison Country Club before running through town. In Otisville, State Road curves around to the west of some small lakes and through town.

State Road turns northwesterly again in Millington in southwestern Tuscola County, heading up to Vassar. In Vassar, M-15 intersects and turns northwest along Huron Avenue, a historical routing of M-24, crossing the Cass River in town. Outside Vassar, Huron Avenue becomes Saginaw Road. In western Tuscola County, M-15 intersects M-46 in the community of Richville. The name of the road changes in Saginaw County to Vassar Road, and the trunkline continues northwesterly through the Blumfield Township communities of Blumfield Corners and Arthur. Arthur is located along the highway between the M-83 and M-81 junctions.

In Bay County, M-15 follows Tuscola Road where it meets the western terminus of M-138 which runs along Munger Road in Munger. As the highway enters Bay City on the southeast side of town, Tuscola Road leaves the farmlands for residential areas of Bay City. The roadway runs northerwesterly near the St. Stanislaus, St. Patrick and Elm Lawn cemeteries, before turning north on Trumbull Street at 10th Street. The highway follows Trumbull Street for five blocks, where the highway designation ends at a four-way intersection with M-25/Center Avenue. Trumbull Street continues north through this residential section of the city.

== History ==
=== Original designation ===
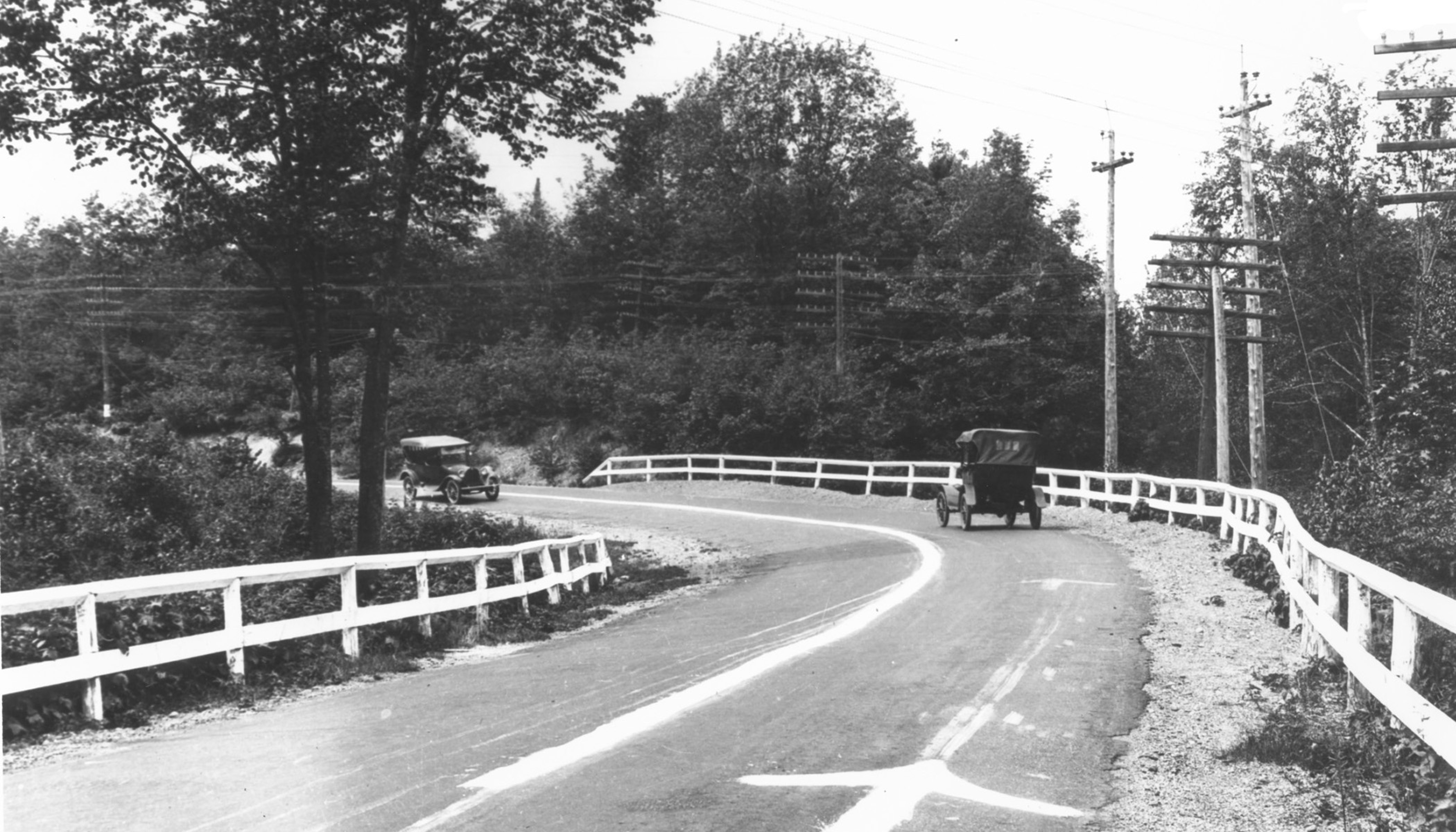
Dead Man's Curve along the Marquette–Negaunee Road shown in 1917 with its hand-painted centerline, the first in the nation

On July 1, 1919, the original routing of M-15 was located in the Upper Peninsula (UP). It ran from the state line along the Menominee River in Menominee, connecting with STH-15 in Wisconsin, running north through the UP to Escanaba, Marquette and Houghton. Between Powers and Escanaba, M-15 ran concurrently with M-12. The northern terminus of the highway was at Fort Wilkins in Copper Harbor. The first highway centerline in the nation was painted along a section of the highway in 1917, along the Marquette–Negaunee Road, now a part of Marquette County Road 492.

The Peshekee River Bridge, carried M-15 over the Peshekee River in western Marquette County's Michigamme Township . The bridge was built in 1914 in response to the 1913 State Trunk Line Act passed by the Michigan Legislature. This act designated a state trunkline highway network of nearly 3,000 miles (4,828 km). The act further said that the Michigan State Highway Department would design, build and maintain trunkline bridges spanning 30 feet (9 m) or more so long as the local governments improved an adjacent 3 miles (4.8 km) of roads. Marquette County built a mainline road from Marquette west to Michigamme near the county line, this road generally followed what is now known as County Road 492 (CR 492). About 5 miles (8.0 km) west of Marquette on CR 492 is a historical marker at the site of the first center line painted in 1917 along Dead Man's Curve. M-15 continued through Morgan Meadows and crossing the Carp River into the town of Negaunee and connecting with Ishpeming. This road is now known as East Division or "County Road" also former Business M-28. West of Ishpeming in Ishpeming Township, M-15 followed Randal Drive and Westward to North Lake Junction. M-15 made its way along what is now CR 496 and several abandoned sections through Clarksburg and Humboldt Locations and the village of Champion. West of Champion M-15 continued to Michigamme crossing the Peshekee River, Marquette County improved a 3-mile (4.8 km) section in 1913 to encourage the state to build the bridge. The bridge was designed by C.V. Dewart for the department and built by the local firm of Powell and Mitchell in Marquette. The bridge was designated Trunk Line Bridge No. 1 as the first state-built bridge on the trunkline highway system.

The 1925 draft plan for the establishment of the US Highway System would have replaced M-15 with three different US Highways. Between Menominee and Powers, M-15 was to be replaced by US 41. East of Powers to Rapid River, the trunkline would have been US 2. The next segment between Rapid River and Humboldt was planned as US 102 while the remainder north to Copper Harbor was not numbered as a US Highway. When the system was announced on November 11, 1926, US 41 was the only US Highway routed along the alignment of M-15. The original map showed US 41 following an unbuilt alignment between Powers and Marquette, but the US 41 designation was instead routed to follow the former M-15.

=== Current designation ===
The current routing of M-15 was designated after 1926. The southern end was located at US 10 in Clarkston running north to M-38 and M-24 in Vassar. By the end of 1936, M-15 was extended concurrently along M-24 from Vassar into Bay City. By June 1942, the M-24 concurrency was removed as M-24 was realigned to replace M-85 between Vassar and Caro. By July 1, 1960, the northern end was extended to run concurrently with M-25 and BUS US 23 to US 23 on the west side of Bay City. This M-15/M-25 routing was extended again in the next year to end at the new I-75/US 10/US 23 freeway. These two northerly extensions were both reversed and scaled back in 1970. M-15's northern end is moved back to M-25/Center Avenue in Bay City, its current location. At some time after the 1993 beginning of the program, M-15 was named the "Pathway to Family Fun" Recreational Heritage Route in what is now the Pure Michigan Byway System. Running roughly parallel to I-75, the route has not been added to the National Highway System, a system of roadways considered important to the nation's economy, defense and mobility.

The state highway map in 1933 showed a proposed southern extension from Clarkston through southern Oakland County, Wayne County into Monroe County. This proposed highway would have bypassed Metro Detroit to the west through Farmington, Northville, Plymouth and Belleville. The full highway was never built, and M-15 was never extended south of Clarkston, but part of this proposal was completed. Much of it later became Haggerty Highway, and part of the I-275 and M-5 corridors.

=== "Death Alley" ===
M-15 between the Oakland County line and I-69 has been nicknamed by locals as "Death Alley". On April 17, 2009, The Flint Journal reported that between 2004 and April 2009, 14 people died on the stretch of road in car accidents. When Genesee County Sheriff Robert J. Pickell was asked about the stretch, he said the road suffers from a bad design, including a lack of turn lanes. He was quoted as saying, "It's a death trap". The Michigan Department of Transportation (MDOT) looks at roadways after every fatal crash to determine what improvements could be made. Other local government officials have called for solutions to safety issues on the roadway.

== Major intersections ==
County	Location	mi	km	Destinations	Notes
Oakland	Independence Charter Township	0.000	0.000	US 24 (Dixie Highway) – Pontiac	
Oakland	Independence Charter Township	1.781	2.866	I-75 – Flint, Detroit	Exit 91 on I-75
Genesee	Davison Township	25.586	41.177	I-69 – Port Huron, Flint	Exit 145 on I-69
Genesee	Forest Township	37.532	60.402	M-57 west – Clio, Montrose, Chesaning	Eastern terminus of M-57
Tuscola	Denmark Township	56.645	91.161	M-46 – Saginaw, Sandusky	
Saginaw	Blumfield Township	60.365	97.148	M-83 south – Frankenmuth	Northern terminus of M-83
Saginaw	Blumfield Township	62.034	99.834	M-81 – Saginaw, Caro	
Bay	Merritt Township	67.665	108.896	M-138 east – Fairgrove, Akron	Western terminus of M-138
Bay	Bay City	73.664	118.551	M-25 / LHCT (Center Avenue)	Roadway continues north as Trumbull Street
1.000 mi = 1.609 km; 1.000 km = 0.621 mi
