= M-138 (Michigan highway) =

State highway in Bay and Tuscola counties in Michigan, United States

M-138
- M-138 highlighted in red

Route information
- Maintained by MDOT
- Length: 20.141 mi (32.414 km)
- Existed: c. 1931–present

Major junctions
- West end: M-15 near Munger
- East end: M-24 near Akron

Location
- Country: United States
- State: Michigan
- Counties: Bay, Tuscola

Highway system
- Michigan State Trunkline Highway System; Interstate; US; State; Byways
← M-137	→ M-139

M-138 is a 20-mile-long (32 km) east–west state trunkline highway in The Thumb region of the US state of Michigan. The highway runs from a junction with M-15 west of the unincorporated community of Munger in Bay County to the intersection with M-24 east of Akron in Tuscola County. The trunkline runs through rural agricultural areas outside of the villages and communities it serves. It was designated in the 1930s and extended in the 1940s. M-138 was truncated in the 1990s as well.

== Route description ==
M-138 begins at a junction with M-15 (Tuscola Road) just west of Munger in Merritt Township. Known as Munger Road, the highway then heads due east through agricultural fields. On the east side of Munger, the roadway crosses a branch line of the Huron and Eastern Railway. M-138 continues east through farm fields and across the Bay–Tuscola county line at Reese Road. The road name changes in Tuscola County to Fairgrove Road, and the trunkline remains on an easterly track to the community of Fairgrove. In the village, M-138 follows Center Street over another crossing of the Huron and Eastern Railway to a junction with Main Street. The highway turns north on Main and crosses the rail line a second time as they both exit town. North of Fairgrove, Main Street becomes Thomas Road, and M-138 runs northward along it through farm fields. After a three-mile (4.8 km) course, M-138 turns eastward again along Akron Road. The highway passes through the village of Akron on Beach Street, crossing the rail line a final time. West of town the Akron Road name resumes, and M-138 terminates at the intersection with M-24 (Unionville Road).

M-138 is maintained by the Michigan Department of Transportation (MDOT) like other state highways in Michigan. As a part of these maintenance responsibilities, the department tracks the volume of traffic that uses the roadways under its jurisdiction. These volumes are expressed using a metric called annual average daily traffic, which is a statistical calculation of the average daily number of vehicles on a segment of roadway. MDOT's surveys in 2010 showed that the highest traffic levels along M-138 were the 2,342 vehicles daily near Munger; the lowest count was 499 vehicles per day just west of Akron. No section of M-138 has not been listed on the National Highway System, a network of roads important to the country's economy, defense, and mobility.

== History ==
M-138 became a part of the state highway system in 1931 between then M-24 (current M-15) in Bay County and then M-83 in Tuscola County. In early 1940, the highway was extended east and northeasterly through Akron to end at M-25 in Unionville; by the end of the year, all of M-138 was paved. When M-24 was extended northward from Caro in 1997, it supplanted the M-138 designation from the Akron area north to Unionville; the latter highway was truncated to its current form as a result.

== Major intersections ==
County	Location	mi	km	Destinations	Notes
Bay	Merritt Township	0.000	0.000	M-15 – Bay City, Vassar	
Tuscola	Akron–Almer–Fairgrove township tri-point	20.141	32.414	M-24 – Unionville, Caro	
1.000 mi = 1.609 km; 1.000 km = 0.621 mi
