= M-24 (Michigan highway) =

State highway in Michigan, United States

M-24
- M-24 highlighted in red

Route information
- Maintained by MDOT
- Length: 75.691 mi (121.813 km)
- Existed: 1927–present

Major junctions
- South end: I-75 / BL I-75 in Auburn Hills
- I-69 near Lapeer
- North end: M-25 near Unionville

Location
- Country: United States
- State: Michigan
- Counties: Oakland, Lapeer, Tuscola

Highway system
- Michigan State Trunkline Highway System; Interstate; US; State; Byways
← US 24	→ Bus. M-24

M-24 is a north–south state trunkline highway in the U.S. state of Michigan that extends 75.691 miles (121.813 km) through Southeast Michigan and The Thumb, from northeast Auburn Hills to Unionville. It starts at an interchange with Interstate 75 (I-75) and ends where it merges with M-25. While the M-24 designation is similar to that of US Highway 24 (US 24) which has a northern terminus located only a few miles from the southern terminus of M-24, M-24 was never part of US 24.

The first M-24 in Michigan was replaced by M-20 when US 10 replaced the original M-20 in 1926. A 1936 bypass of downtown Pontiac resulted in the creation of M-24A which later became BUS M-24 in 1940. An extension in 1997 moved the northern end of M-24 northward from Caro to Unionville, replacing a section of M-138 in the process.

== Route description ==
M-24 begins a hundred feet south of an overpass that is part of a double trumpet interchange with I-75 in Auburn Hills. The interchange also connects with an entrance into The Palace of Auburn Hills, former home of the NBA's Detroit Pistons, and a variety of electronic signs are contained in the area to indicate the status of access to the entrance. The roadway is a continuation of Business Loop I-75 (BL I-75) that travels through Pontiac. This section of the highway dedicated to William Davidson, former owner of the Pistons, in legislation signed by Michigan Governor Rick Snyder in May 2011.

The section of M-24 from its southern terminus in Auburn Hills north to the village of Oxford is one of the busiest stretches of road in the state in terms of annual average daily traffic (AADT). Near The Palace of Auburn Hills, 50,600 vehicles used the roadway on average in 2007. The road is a standard Michigan expressway design, with at-grade intersections, traffic signals, and Michigan Lefts. M-24 continues north through the Bald Mountain Recreation Area and along the eastern shore of Lake Orion in the village of Lake Orion. This expressway continues a few miles north of the Lapeer County line, where the highway becomes a two-lane highway for a few miles, before returning to expressway from Metamora to I-69. South of Metamora, M-24 runs parallel to the former right-of-way for the Michigan Central Railroad north into the city of Lapeer.

M-24 continues north from Lapeer running west of Barnes Lake and east of the community of Columbiaville just south of the M-90 junction. South of the Tuscola County line, the trunkline passes the Greenbriar Golf Club and crosses the Pere Marquette Railroad before turning west along Saginaw Road into the community of Mayville and turning north along Mertz Road. South of Caro, M-24 meets M-46. Once past Frank Street in Caro, M-24 becomes Ellington Street. M-24 then comes to meet M-81 in Caro, where the highway becomes Cleaver Road. M-24 then jogs west along Biebel Road and then north along Unionville Road past a junction with M-138 to end in Unionville at M-25.

M-24 is also known locally as Lapeer Road in several areas, including Orion Township, Oxford Township, and Metamora. In the Village of Oxford, it is also known as Washington Street. In downtown Lapeer, it is known as Main Street, and north of Mayville as Mertz Rd. In the Unionville area, it is also known as Unionville Road.

== History ==
=== Original designation ===
In 1919, the first M-24 was designated along today's M-20. From Midland east, M-24 continued along today's M-47. When the U.S. Highway System was created, US 10 replaced M-20 and M-20 in turn replaced the first M-24. The M-24 designation was then applied to the current routing.

=== Current designation ===
The current designation was assigned in two pieces, Pontiac to Lapeer and Vassar to Bay City. The two sections would be joined in 1927 by a concurrency along M-21 and M-15. This arrangement lasted until a permanent solo routing was created in 1930. The Pontiac area saw a rerouting of M-24 to an eastern bypass of town in 1936. The former routing in town became M-24A. It would be redesignated as BUS M-24 in 1940 when the State Highway Department debuted business routes in Michigan. The northern terminus was moved to M-81 in Caro in 1942, and the southern terminus was shifted to the present location in 1963. Prior to a 1997 extension, M-24 ended at M-81 in Caro; now it continues up to M-25 in Unionville.

From 2006 to 2008, M-24 was expanded to a boulevard between Metamora and Lapeer. There is still a two lane section between the Lapeer/Oakland County Line and Metamora that is planned to be upgraded in the near future. The construction has been delayed because of development close to the highway near Metamora.

== Major intersections ==
County	Location	mi	km	Destinations	Notes
Oakland	Auburn Hills	0.000	0.000	I-75 – Detroit, Flint; BL I-75 – Pontiac	Exit 81 on I-75; roadway continues south as BL I-75
Lapeer	Lapeer	23.940– 23.964	38.528– 38.566	I-69 – Flint, Port Huron	Exit 155 on I-69
Lapeer	Deerfield Township	37.610	60.527	M-90 east – North Branch	
Tuscola	Indianfields Township	53.141	85.522	M-46 – Saginaw, Sandusky	
Tuscola	Caro	59.122	95.148	M-81 – Reese, Cass City	
Tuscola	Akron Township	69.723	112.208	M-138 west – Akron, Fairgrove	
Tuscola	Unionville	75.691	121.813	M-25 / LHCT – Bay City, Sebewaing	
1.000 mi = 1.609 km; 1.000 km = 0.621 mi
