= Gilford Township, Michigan =

- Township
- Location within the state of Michigan
- Coordinates: 43°31′48″N 83°39′7″W
- Country: United States
- State: Michigan
- County: Tuscola

Area
  - Total: 34.8 sq mi (90.1 km^{2})
  - Land: 34.8 sq mi (90.1 km^{2})
  - Water: 0 sq mi (0.0 km^{2})
- Elevation: 597 ft (182 m)

Population (2020)
  - Total: 735
  - Density: 21.1/sq mi (8.16/km^{2})
- Time zone: UTC-5 (Eastern (EST))
  - Summer (DST): UTC-4 (EDT)
- ZIP code: 48733 (Fairgrove), 48736 (Gilford P.O. Box), 48757 (Reese)
- Area code: 989
- FIPS code: 26-32160
- GNIS feature ID: 1626352
- Website: https://www.gilfordtownship.com/

Gilford Township is a civil township of Tuscola County in the U.S. state of Michigan. The population was 735 at the 2020 census.

== Communities ==
- Gilford is an unincorporated community in the southwest part of the township at 43°29′39″N 83°37′19″W. The ZIP code 48736 provides P.O. Box only service for the community. Gilford was named for the Gilford family. A post office was established in June 1869. It closed in July 1875 and re-opened in August 1878.
- Fairgrove is a village to the east in Fairgrove Township, and the Farigrove ZIP code 48733 also serves areas in the northern and eastern parts of Gilford Township.
- Reese is a village to the southwest in Denmark Township, and the Reese ZIP code 48757 also serves the southern and western parts of Gilford Township.

== Geography ==
According to the United States Census Bureau, the township has a total area of 34.8 square miles (90 km^{2}), all land.

== Demographics ==
As of the census of 2000, there were 833 people, 317 households, and 241 families residing in the township. The population density was 23.9 inhabitants per square mile (9.2/km^{2}). There were 339 housing units at an average density of 9.7 per square mile (3.7/km^{2}). The racial makeup of the township was 97.84% White, 0.36% African American, 0.84% from other races, and 0.96% from two or more races. Hispanic or Latino of any race were 3.24% of the population.

There were 317 households, out of which 35.0% had children under the age of 18 living with them, 65.6% were married couples living together, 7.6% had a female householder with no husband present, and 23.7% were non-families. 22.1% of all households were made up of individuals, and 11.0% had someone living alone who was 65 years of age or older. The average household size was 2.62 and the average family size was 3.05.

In the township the population was spread out, with 26.1% under the age of 18, 8.8% from 18 to 24, 27.7% from 25 to 44, 22.8% from 45 to 64, and 14.6% who were 65 years of age or older. The median age was 38 years. For every 100 females, there were 98.3 males. For every 100 females age 18 and over, there were 96.2 males.

The median income for a household in the township was $40,288, and the median income for a family was $45,000. Males had a median income of $32,206 versus $25,500 for females. The per capita income for the township was $17,778. About 7.4% of families and 8.1% of the population were below the poverty line, including 9.4% of those under age 18 and 12.8% of those age 65 or over.
