= Wisner Township, Michigan =

- Township
- Location within the state of Michigan
- Coordinates: 43°35′59″N 83°38′1″W
- Country: United States
- State: Michigan
- County: Tuscola
- Organized: 1861

Area
  - Total: 25.6 sq mi (66.4 km^{2})
  - Land: 19.4 sq mi (50.2 km^{2})
  - Water: 6.3 sq mi (16.3 km^{2})
- Elevation: 587 ft (179 m)

Population (2020)
  - Total: 604
  - Density: 31.2/sq mi (12.0/km^{2})
- Time zone: UTC-5 (Eastern (EST))
  - Summer (DST): UTC-4 (EDT)
- ZIP codes: 48701 (Akron); 48733 (Fairgrove)
- FIPS code: 26-88080
- GNIS feature ID: 1627284
- Website: https://wisnertwp.com/

Wisner Township is a civil township of Tuscola County in the U.S. state of Michigan. The population was 604 at the 2020 census.

The first land entries in this area were made by Joshua Terry in 1853, by Green Bird in 1854, and by Isaiah Jester in 1855. The township was first organized in 1861 and named after Moses Wisner, Governor of Michigan from 1859 to 1861.

== Communities ==
- Bay Park is an unincorporated community in the northeast corner and border of the township with Akron Township on Saginaw Bay at 43°39′17″N 83°35′21″W.
- Bradleyville is an unincorporated community in the township on Bradleyville Road north of Elmwood Road at 43°35′00″N 83°37′25″W.
- Oakhurst is an unincorporated community in the township on Saginaw Bay at Allen and Garner Road at 43°38′23″N 83°36′22″W.
- Quanicassee is an unincorporated community in the township at the mouth of the Quanicassee River on Saginaw Bay at 43°35′00″N 83°40′51″W. The name Quanicassee is of Native American origin meaning "lone tree". The area had been a Native American fishing village long before the arrival of white settlers, and there are no clear records regarding early settlement. A post office with the name "Quanicasse City" was established on June 11, 1886, with Horace G. Webster as the first postmaster. The office operated until March 31, 1902.
- Wisner is an unincorporated community at 43°36′59″N 83°35′03″W on the eastern boundary of the township with Akron Township centered about the junction of Vassar Road (marking the township line) and M-25/Bay City Forestville Rd, with settlement spread into both townships along M-25. A post office named Wisner was established on December 11, 1871, with Henry H. Gilbert as the first postmaster. The post office operated until May 31, 1905.
- The village of Akron is to the east, and the Akron post office, with ZIP code 48701, also serves the northeast portion of Wisner Township.
- The village of Fairgrove is to the southeast, and the Fairgrove post office, with ZIP code 48733, also serves the southwest portion of Wisner Township.

== Geography ==
According to the United States Census Bureau, the township has a total area of 25.6 square miles (66 km^{2}), of which 19.4 square miles (50 km^{2}) is land and 6.3 square miles (16 km^{2}) (24.52%) is water.

== Demographics ==
As of the census of 2000, there were 749 people, 309 households, and 231 families residing in the township. The population density was 38.7 inhabitants per square mile (14.9/km^{2}). There were 368 housing units at an average density of 19.0 per square mile (7.3/km^{2}). The racial makeup of the township was 97.20% White, 0.13% African American, 0.67% Native American, 0.13% Asian, 0.13% Pacific Islander, 0.53% from other races, and 1.20% from two or more races. Hispanic or Latino of any race were 3.07% of the population.

There were 309 households, out of which 24.6% had children under the age of 18 living with them, 64.4% were married couples living together, 5.8% had a female householder with no husband present, and 25.2% were non-families. 22.0% of all households were made up of individuals, and 8.1% had someone living alone who was 65 years of age or older. The average household size was 2.42 and the average family size was 2.80.

In the township the population was spread out, with 19.8% under the age of 18, 7.3% from 18 to 24, 25.5% from 25 to 44, 31.0% from 45 to 64, and 16.4% who were 65 years of age or older. The median age was 44 years. For every 100 females, there were 109.8 males. For every 100 females age 18 and over, there were 110.1 males.

The median income for a household in the township was $35,250, and the median income for a family was $47,625. Males had a median income of $39,375 versus $25,625 for females. The per capita income for the township was $20,153. About 10.6% of families and 13.0% of the population were below the poverty line, including 17.6% of those under age 18 and 4.7% of those age 65 or over.
