= Blumfield Township, Michigan =

- Civil township
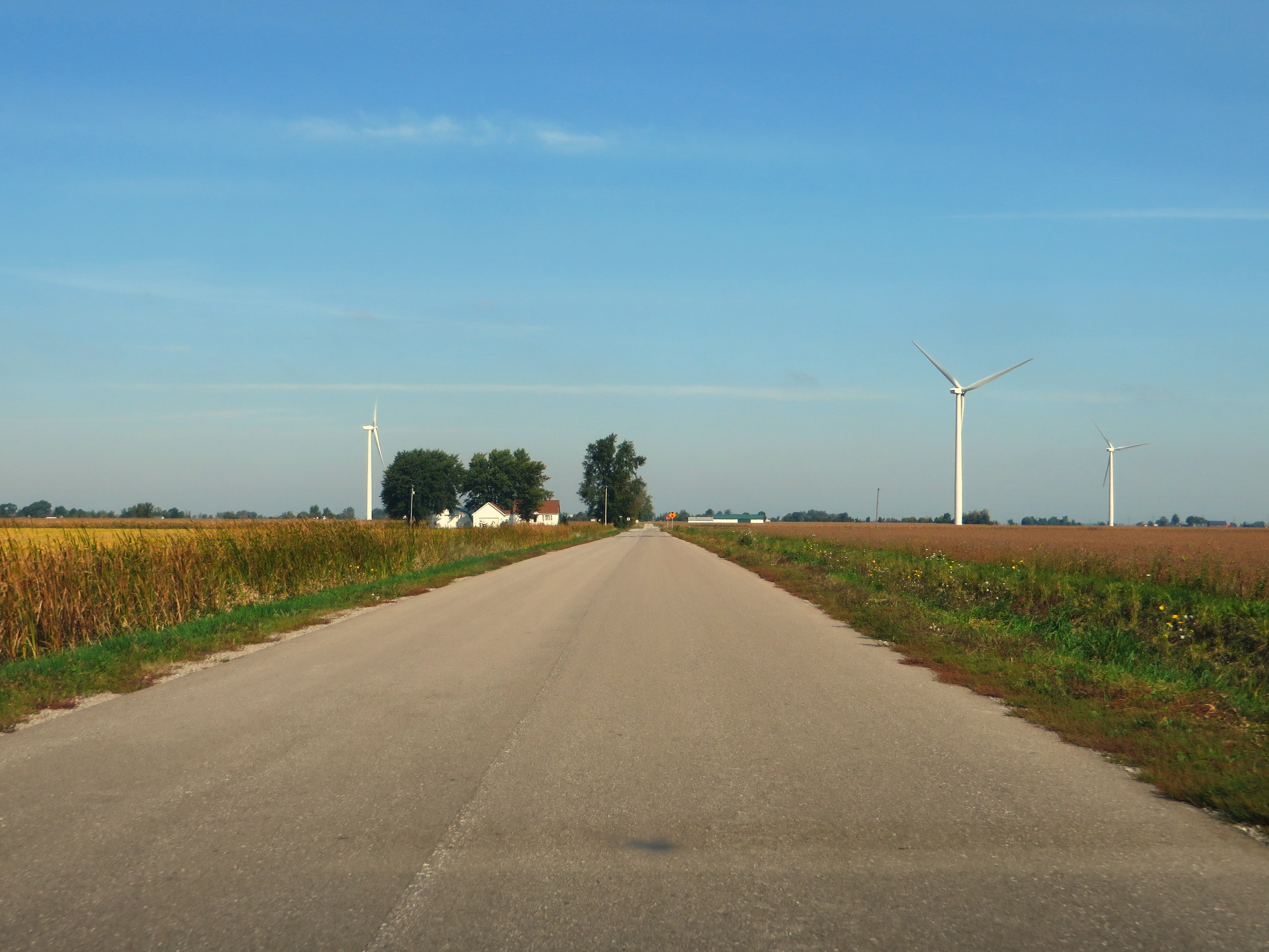
- Rural farm road within Blumfield Township

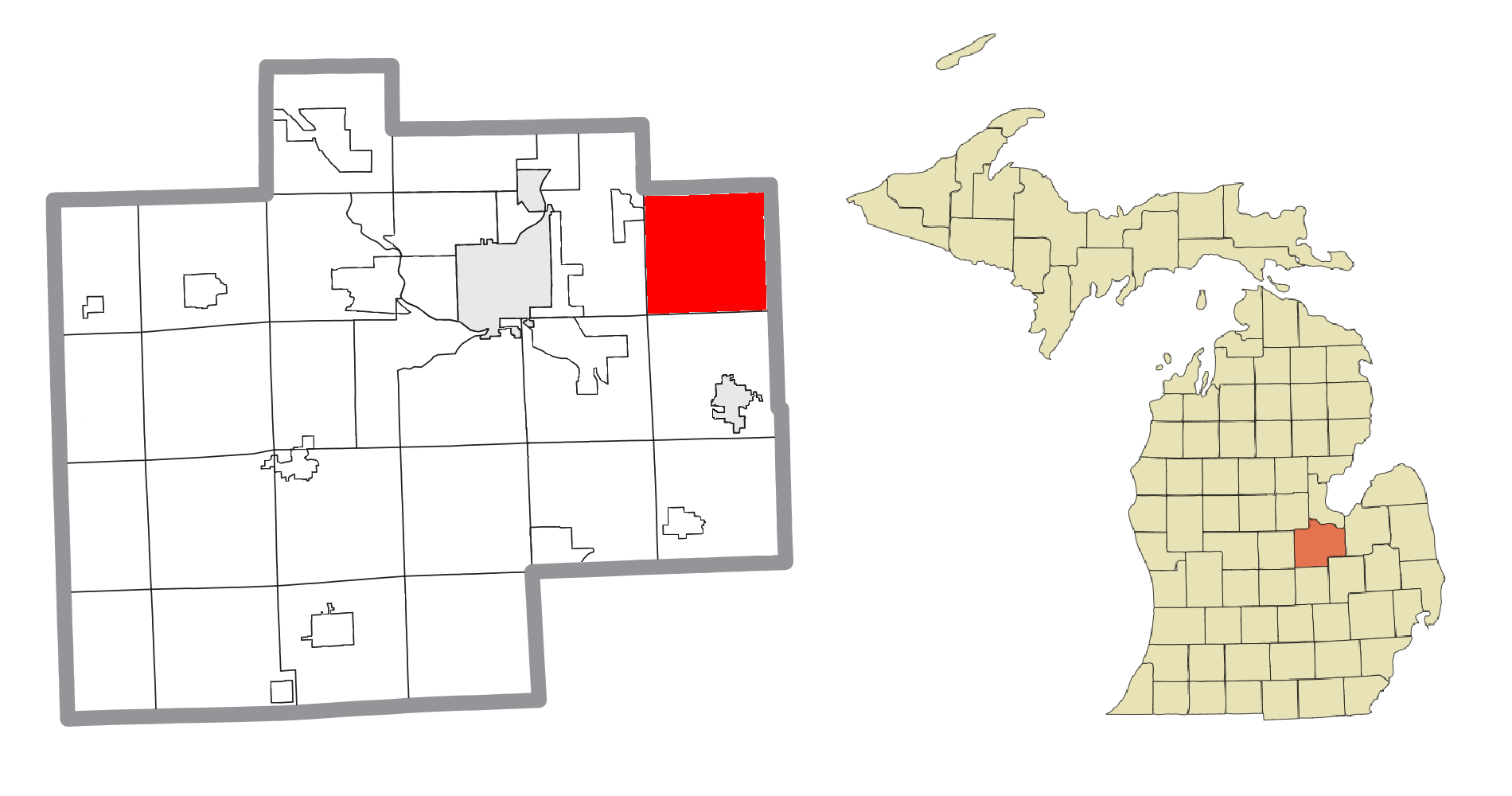
- Location within Saginaw County

- Location within the state of Michigan Blumfield Township (the United States)
- Coordinates: 43°25′57″N 83°46′12″W
- Country: United States
- State: Michigan
- County: Saginaw
- Established: 1853

Government
  - Supervisor: Wesley Reinbold

Area
  - Total: 35.6 sq mi (92.3 km^{2})
  - Land: 35.6 sq mi (92.3 km^{2})
  - Water: 0 sq mi (0.0 km^{2})
- Elevation: 610 ft (186 m)

Population (2020)
  - Total: 1,874
  - Density: 52.6/sq mi (20.3/km^{2})
- Time zone: UTC-5 (Eastern (EST))
  - Summer (DST): UTC-4 (EDT)
- ZIP code(s): 48601 (Saginaw); 48734 (Frankenmuth); 48747 (Munger); 48757 (Reese)
- Area code: 989
- FIPS code: 26-09400
- GNIS feature ID: 1625957
- Website: Official website

Blumfield Township is a civil township of Saginaw County in the U.S. state of Michigan. As of the 2020 Census, the township population was 1,874.

== History ==
Blumfield Township was founded in 1853 by Carl Post and George F. Veenfliet named after Robert Blum. It was the site of one sawmill and several farms around 1880. At that point it had been primarily settled by immigrants from Germany. Most of these immigrants were people who had favored the 1848 reforms and left in the wake of their suppression.

== Communities ==
- Arthur, or Blumfield Junction was a small community with a station on a branch of the Michigan Central Railroad. A post office operated as Blumfield Junction from May 31, 1862, to October 20, 1880. It reopened as Arthur and operated from December 1880 until October 1904. It was located on M-15 between the junctions with M-81 to the north and M-83 to the south.
- Blumfield Corners is a small unincorporated community on M-15 at Block Road a few miles northwest of Richville and about a mile east of the junction with M-83 and about a mile north of M-46 at 43°25′27″N 83°43′06″W
- Frankentrost (once also called Trostville) is a small unincorporated community at M-46 and Mueller Road a few miles west the junction with M-83 at 43°24′26″N 83°47′31″W. It was established in 1847 by a community of Lutheran immigrants from Bavaria.
- The village of Reese is over the eastern boundary in Tuscola County, though some development is in the township.

== Geography ==
According to the United States Census Bureau, the township has a total area of 35.6 square miles (92 km^{2}), all land.

== Demographics ==
As of the census of 2000, there were 2,014 people, 726 households, and 598 families residing in the township. The population density was 56.5 inhabitants per square mile (21.8/km^{2}). There were 757 housing units at an average density of 21.2 per square mile (8.2/km^{2}). The racial makeup of the township was 98.56% White, 0.25% Native American, 0.65% Asian, 0.05% from other races, and 0.50% from two or more races. Hispanic or Latino of any race were 1.59% of the population.

There were 726 households, out of which 36.8% had children under the age of 18 living with them, 75.9% were married couples living together, 4.5% had a female householder with no husband present, and 17.6% were non-families. 14.3% of all households were made up of individuals, and 6.3% had someone living alone who was 65 years of age or older. The average household size was 2.76 and the average family size was 3.08.

In the township the population was spread out, with 26.2% under the age of 18, 6.2% from 18 to 24, 28.4% from 25 to 44, 26.2% from 45 to 64, and 13.0% who were 65 years of age or older. The median age was 39 years. For every 100 females, there were 101.6 males. For every 100 females age 18 and over, there were 97.3 males.

The median income for a household in the township was $53,182, and the median income for a family was $55,750. Males had a median income of $46,875 versus $29,444 for females. The per capita income for the township was $22,514. About 2.5% of families and 3.9% of the population were below the poverty line, including 5.7% of those under age 18 and 4.3% of those age 65 or over.

== Notable people ==
- Richard Veenfliet
