= Thomas, Michigan =

Thomas, Michigan may refer to:

- Thomas, Oakland County, Michigan, a historical community in Oxford Charter Township
- Thomas, Tuscola County, Michigan, an unincorporated community in Akron Township
