= Richard Veenfliet =

Richard D. Veenfliet
- Born: August 2, 1843; Wesel, Prussia
- Died: August 20, 1922 (aged 79); Vineland, New Jersey, United States of America

Pair of Early Prints by Richard Veenfliet depicting scenes possibly in Venice.

Richard Veenfliet (August 2, 1843 – August 20, 1922) was an American commercial artist known for illustration-figure, genre, and landscape. Today, Richard Veenfliet is perhaps best known for his postcards.

== Early life, family and education ==
Richard Veenfliet was born on August 2, 1843, in Wesel, Prussia. Veenfliet was the second child of eight children. The Veenfliet family emigrated to the United States of America after his father, George F. Veenfliet, a former Prussian officer, professor of Mathematics and Physical Sciences at the University of Bonn and professor of Languages and Sciences at the High School of Aix-la-Chapelle, became embroiled in the Revolutions of 1848.

Soon after the family arrived in Detroit, and in the company of a companion, Carl Post, a friend of similar thought and character, they began to explore the country toward the Saginaw River. The Veenfliets then became one of the founding families of Blumfield Township, Michigan. Many Native Americans lived in this part of Michigan and, perhaps unique to its time, the two groups were friendly and lived peacefully together. In fact, they often had to work together. While the primeval forest of Blumfield was very beautiful, it often proved to be hazardous and full of unexpected hardships.

The Veenfliets named Blumfeld Township after Robert Blum, also a political offender, who was shot in 1848 by the King's soldiers for daring to take the part of his oppressed fellow men.

The Veenfliets, along with Rudolph Diepenbeck, were advocates for immigration. They established and staffed offices in New York City and Detroit, from which they sent promotional pamphlets abroad. They were also liberal in their religious views. The beliefs of the Veenfliets often reflected those of Robert Blum and, by extension, the period of Romanticism.

Veenfliet attended school in Blumfield, Saginaw and Detroit, where he studied architecture. In Saginaw in the summer of 1863, he took drawing lessons from a Mr. Haugh and the following year enlisted in a Michigan Infantry unit in the Civil War.

== Civil War ==
A picture of Robert Blum long graced the walls of the primitive log school house in Blumfield Township. It represented him kneeling on the ground, his Executioners ranged in front, and he in the act of tearing the folds from his eyes, and saying: "An honest brave man does not fear death, he glories in the thought of dying for his country." This would later inspire many young men in Blumfield County to join the Union Army, including Richard Veenfliet and his older brother Fred. Specifically, men from Blumfield were inspired by Robert Blum to wipe out slavery as a national institution. Richard's father, George F. Veenfliet, was one of the delegates to the 1860 Republican National Convention, which nominated Abraham Lincoln for president.

Both Richard and his brother Fred were part of the 14th Michigan Volunteer Infantry Regiment and the 29th Michigan Volunteer Infantry Regiment.

Richard Veenfliet's brother Fred died in the Battle of Nashville, December 15, 1864, when rebel General John Bell Hood surrounded and attempted to capture the city.

== Post Civil War and World War I ==
After the war, he worked as a laborer, salesman and architect. In 1884, he moved to New York City, where he took a job as a foreman of the art department with Frankmann Bailey & Blanpy.

It is highly likely that Richard Veenfliet had to register as German and report to county court during World War I, as records have confirmed his younger sister Augusta's registration. This was a time in which many Americans were angry and suspicious towards German-Americans, and during the course of the war the government registered nearly half a million "enemy alien" civilians and interned nearly 6,000. Unfortunately, many states have not released these records and thus cannot be confirmed.

Richard Veenfliet was a member of the Cincinnati Art Club and held a position at the Strobridge Lithographic Company. He also exhibited his work at the Chicago Art Institute. He died in 1922, painting at his easel one of the many watercolors for which he is well known.
