= Akron Township, Michigan =

- Township
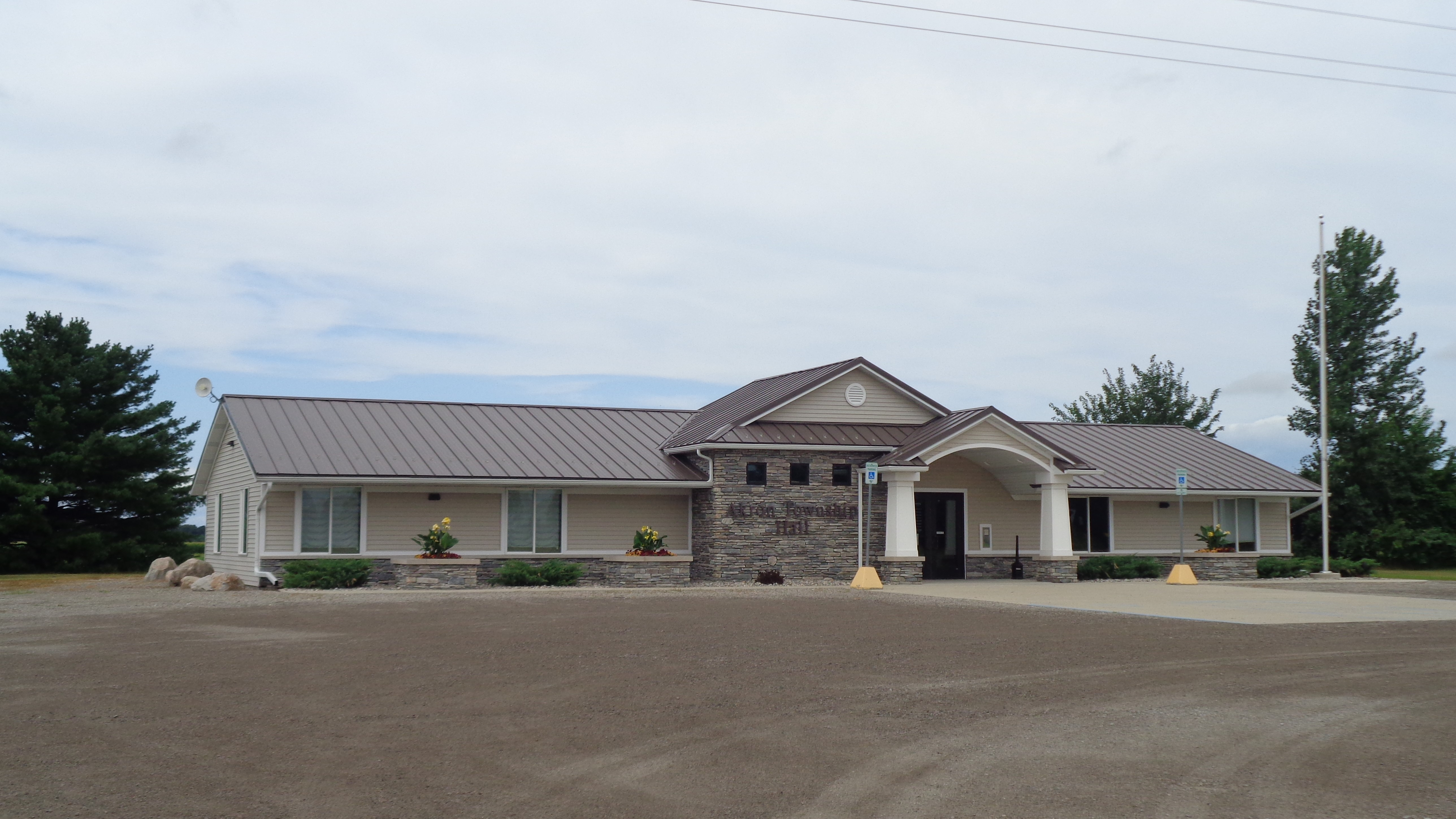
- Akron Township Hall

- Location within the state of Michigan
- Coordinates: 43°38′32″N 83°31′33″W
- Country: United States
- State: Michigan
- County: Tuscola

Area
  - Total: 56.9 sq mi (147.4 km^{2})
  - Land: 52.9 sq mi (137.0 km^{2})
  - Water: 4.0 sq mi (10.4 km^{2})
- Elevation: 594 ft (181 m)

Population (2020)
  - Total: 1,379
  - Density: 26.07/sq mi (10.07/km^{2})
- Time zone: UTC-5 (Eastern (EST))
  - Summer (DST): UTC-4 (EDT)
- ZIP code: 48701 (Akron), 48759 (Sebewaing), 48767 (Unionville)
- Area code: 989
- FIPS code: 26-00720
- GNIS feature ID: 1625807
- Website: https://www.akrontwp.com/

Akron Township is a civil township of Tuscola County in the U.S. state of Michigan. The population was 1,379 at the 2020 Census.

== Communities ==
- The village of Akron is in the southern part of the township straddling the boundary between Akron Township to the north and Fairgrove Township to the south. The Akron post office, with ZIP code 48701, also serves the southern and western portions of Akron Township.
- Bay Park is an unincorporated community on the border of the Township with Wisner Township on Saginaw Bay west of Vassar Road and Bay Park Road at 43°39′17″N 83°35′21″W. It was platted as a subdivision on June 5, 1885.
- Wisner is an unincorporated community on the boundary between Akron Township to the east and Wisner Township to the west.
- Thomas is an unincorporated community in the northern part of the township on Saginaw Bay at 43°42′02″N 83°32′53″W. Thomas was platted in three sections: Thomas Fisheries (1942), Thomas Park (1947) and Thomas (1957) subdivisions.

== Geography ==
According to the United States Census Bureau, the township has a total area of 56.9 square miles (147 km^{2}), of which 52.9 square miles (137 km^{2}) is land and 4.0 square miles (10 km^{2}) (7.05%) is water.

The civil township comprises most of survey townships 14 and 15 north of range 8 east. Section 1 of T14N and section 36 of T15N have been attached to Columbia Township, which is adjacent to the east of Akron Township. These sections surround the village of Unionville, which also incorporates smaller portions of both sections.

Survey township 15N, on the shores of Saginaw Bay, is a partial township consisting of thirteen full 1 square mile (2.6 km^{2}) sections and eleven partial sections, with the remainder lying under water.

== Demographics ==
As of the census of 2000, there were 1,589 people, 602 households, and 441 families residing in the township. The population density was 30.0 inhabitants per square mile (11.6/km^{2}). There were 767 housing units at an average density of 14.5 per square mile (5.6/km^{2}). The racial makeup of the township was 95.85% White, 0.19% African American, 0.76% Native American, 0.19% Asian, 1.76% from other races, and 1.26% from two or more races. Hispanic or Latino of any race were 4.59% of the population.

There were 602 households, out of which 32.2% had children under the age of 18 living with them, 63.6% were married couples living together, 6.6% had a female householder with no husband present, and 26.6% were non-families. 23.1% of all households were made up of individuals, and 11.3% had someone living alone who was 65 years of age or older. The average household size was 2.58 and the average family size was 3.01.

In the township the population was spread out, with 25.9% under the age of 18, 6.9% from 18 to 24, 28.6% from 25 to 44, 23.9% from 45 to 64, and 14.8% who were 65 years of age or older. The median age was 38 years. For every 100 females, there were 103.2 males. For every 100 females age 18 and over, there were 99.3 males.

The median income for a household in the township was $36,891, and the median income for a family was $43,056. Males had a median income of $32,326 versus $21,548 for females. The per capita income for the township was $16,487. About 6.2% of families and 11.7% of the population were below the poverty line, including 12.9% of those under age 18 and 14.3% of those age 65 or over.
