= Merritt Township, Michigan =

- Civil township
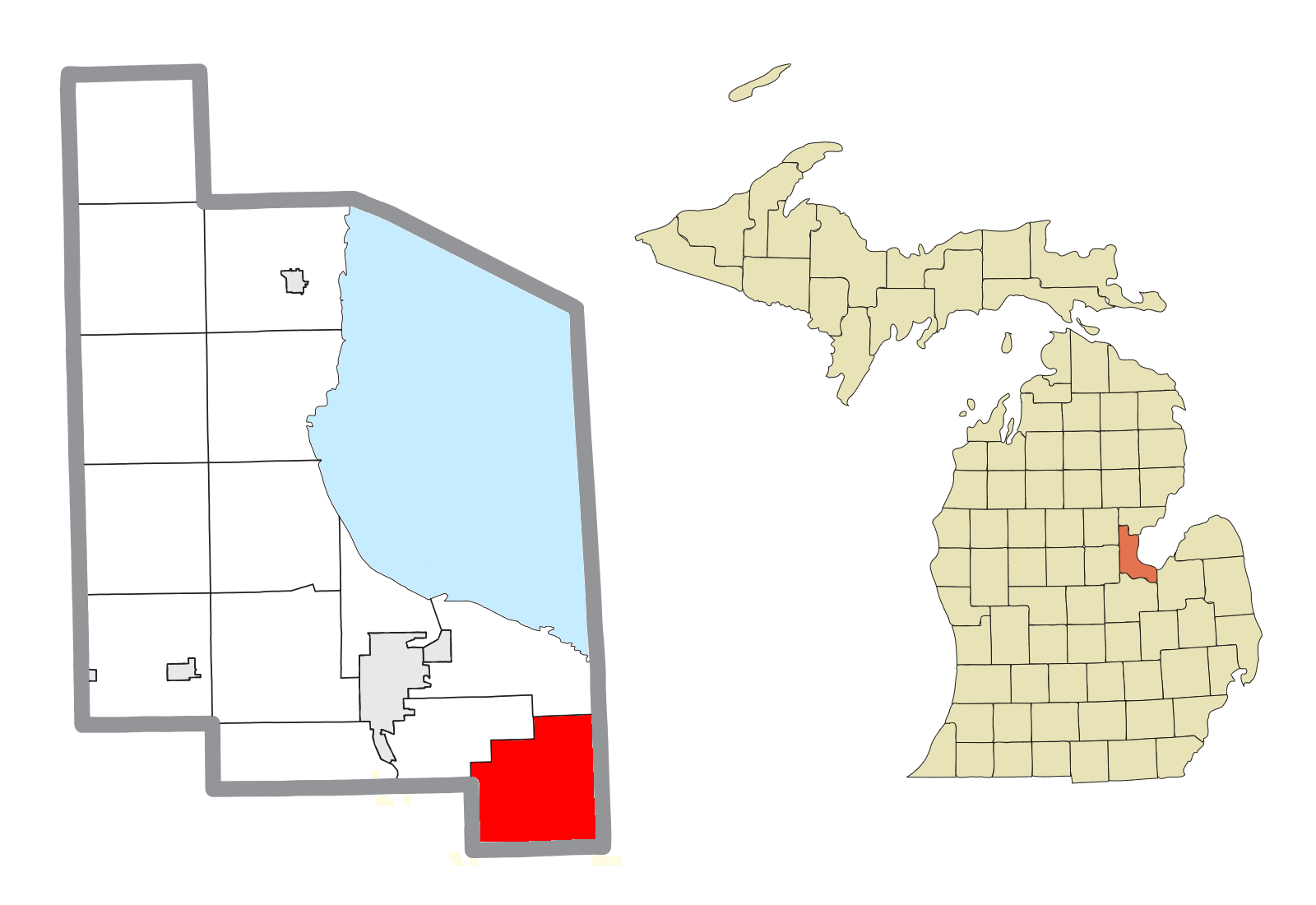
- Location within Bay County

- Location within the state of Michigan Merritt Township (the United States)
- Coordinates: 43°31′06″N 83°44′55″W
- Country: United States
- State: Michigan
- County: Bay
- Established: 1871

Area
  - Total: 31.67 sq mi (82.03 km^{2})
  - Land: 31.64 sq mi (81.96 km^{2})
  - Water: 0.031 sq mi (0.08 km^{2})
- Elevation: 587 ft (179 m)

Population (2020)
  - Total: 1,352
  - Density: 45.5/sq mi (17.6/km^{2})
- Time zone: UTC-5 (Eastern (EST))
  - Summer (DST): UTC-4 (EDT)
- ZIP code(s): 48708 (Bay City); 48747 (Munger); 48757 (Reese)
- Area code: 989
- FIPS code: 26-53220
- GNIS feature ID: 1626729
- Website: http://merritttownship.gov/

Merritt Township is a civil township of Bay County in the U.S. state of Michigan. The township's population was 1,352 as of the 2020 census. It is included in the Bay City Metropolitan Statistical Area.

== Communities ==
There are two unincorporated communities in the township:

- Arn is at the junction of the Huron and Eastern Railway, Kinney Road and Nolet Road. The community was formed around a sawmill. A post office was established here in 1877.
- Munger is located along Munger Road (M-138) from at least Finn Road to west of the Huron and Eastern Railway. (Elevation: 594 ft./181 m.)

== History ==
Merritt Township was organized on July 8, 1871, with the area being detached from Portsmouth Township. On June 6, 1876, the Munger Post Office was opened. A post office opened in Arn on February 28, 1877. On May 15, 1886, the Arn Post Office was closed. The Arn Post Office was reopened on April 20, 1894, lasting until July 30, 1904.

== Geography ==
According to the United States Census Bureau, the township has a total area of 31.7 square miles (82.0 km^{2}), of which 0.031 square miles (0.08 km^{2}), or 0.09%, is water.

== Demographics ==
Historical population
Census	Pop.	Note	%±
1900	1,562		—
1960	1,762		—
1970	1,902		7.9%
1980	1,676		−11.9%
1990	1,510		−9.9%
2000	1,510		0.0%
2010	1,441		−4.6%
2020	1,352		−6.2%

As of the census of 2010, there were 1,441 people, 554 households, and 430 families residing in the township. The population density was 45.5/sq mi (17.58/km^{2}). There were 554 housing units at an average density of 17.5 per square mile (6.8/km^{2}). The racial makeup of the township was 96.7% White, 0.1% African American, 0.6% Native American, 0.3% Asian, 1.0% from other races, and 1.5% from two or more races Hispanic or Latino of any race were 2.8% of the population.

There were 554 households, out of which 37.2% had children under the age of 18 living with them, 64.8% were married couples living together, 7.4% had a female householder with no husband present, and 22.4% were non-families. 18.9% of all households were made up of individuals, and 9.2% had someone living alone who was 65 years of age or older. The average household size was 2.60 and the average family size was 2.93.

In the township the population was spread out, with 22.4% under the age of 18, 7.6% from 18 to 24, 24.3% from 25 to 44, 30.8% from 45 to 64, and 14.9% who were 65 years of age or older. The median age was 41.7 years. For every 100 females, there were 105.3 males. For every 100 females age 18 and over, there were 102.2 males.

The median income for a household in the township was $58,438, and the median income for a family was $65,750. Males had a median income of $53,125 versus $35,750 for females. The per capita income for the township was $29,055. About 6.1% of families and 7.4% of the population were below the poverty line, including 10.1% of those under age 18 and 8.2% of those age 65 or over.
