= Fairgrove Township, Michigan =

- Township
- Location within the state of Michigan
- Coordinates: 43°31′29″N 83°31′44″W
- Country: United States
- State: Michigan
- County: Tuscola

Area
  - Total: 35.3 sq mi (91.5 km^{2})
  - Land: 35.3 sq mi (91.5 km^{2})
  - Water: 0 sq mi (0.0 km^{2})
- Elevation: 646 ft (197 m)

Population (2020)
  - Total: 1,549
  - Density: 43.8/sq mi (16.9/km^{2})
- Time zone: UTC-5 (Eastern (EST))
  - Summer (DST): UTC-4 (EDT)
- ZIP code: 48733
- Area code: 989
- FIPS code: 26-27100
- GNIS feature ID: 1626265
- Website: Township website

Fairgrove Township is a civil township of Tuscola County in the U.S. state of Michigan. The population was 1,549 at the 2020 census. The village of Fairgrove is located within the township, as well as the southern half of the village of Akron.

== Geography ==
According to the United States Census Bureau, the township has a total area of 35.3 square miles (91 km^{2}), all land.

== Demographics ==
As of the census of 2000, there were 1,749 people, 653 households, and 487 families residing in the township. The population density was 49.5 inhabitants per square mile (19.1/km^{2}). There were 711 housing units at an average density of 20.1 per square mile (7.8/km^{2}). The racial makeup of the township was 96.00% White, 0.17% African American, 0.51% Native American, 0.17% Asian, 1.66% from other races, and 1.49% from two or more races. Hispanic or Latino of any race were 4.97% of the population.

There were 653 households, out of which 31.9% had children under the age of 18 living with them, 61.3% were married couples living together, 8.1% had a female householder with no husband present, and 25.4% were non-families. 22.4% of all households were made up of individuals, and 8.0% had someone living alone who was 65 years of age or older. The average household size was 2.60 and the average family size was 3.00.

In the township the population was spread out, with 25.8% under the age of 18, 7.5% from 18 to 24, 28.1% from 25 to 44, 24.1% from 45 to 64, and 14.4% who were 65 years of age or older. The median age was 38 years. For every 100 females, there were 95.9 males. For every 100 females age 18 and over, there were 93.3 males.

The median income for a household in the township was $39,653, and the median income for a family was $43,125. Males had a median income of $32,061 versus $24,609 for females. The per capita income for the township was $20,511. About 2.8% of families and 5.8% of the population were below the poverty line, including 5.0% of those under age 18 and 3.2% of those age 65 or over.
