= Unionville, Michigan =

- Village
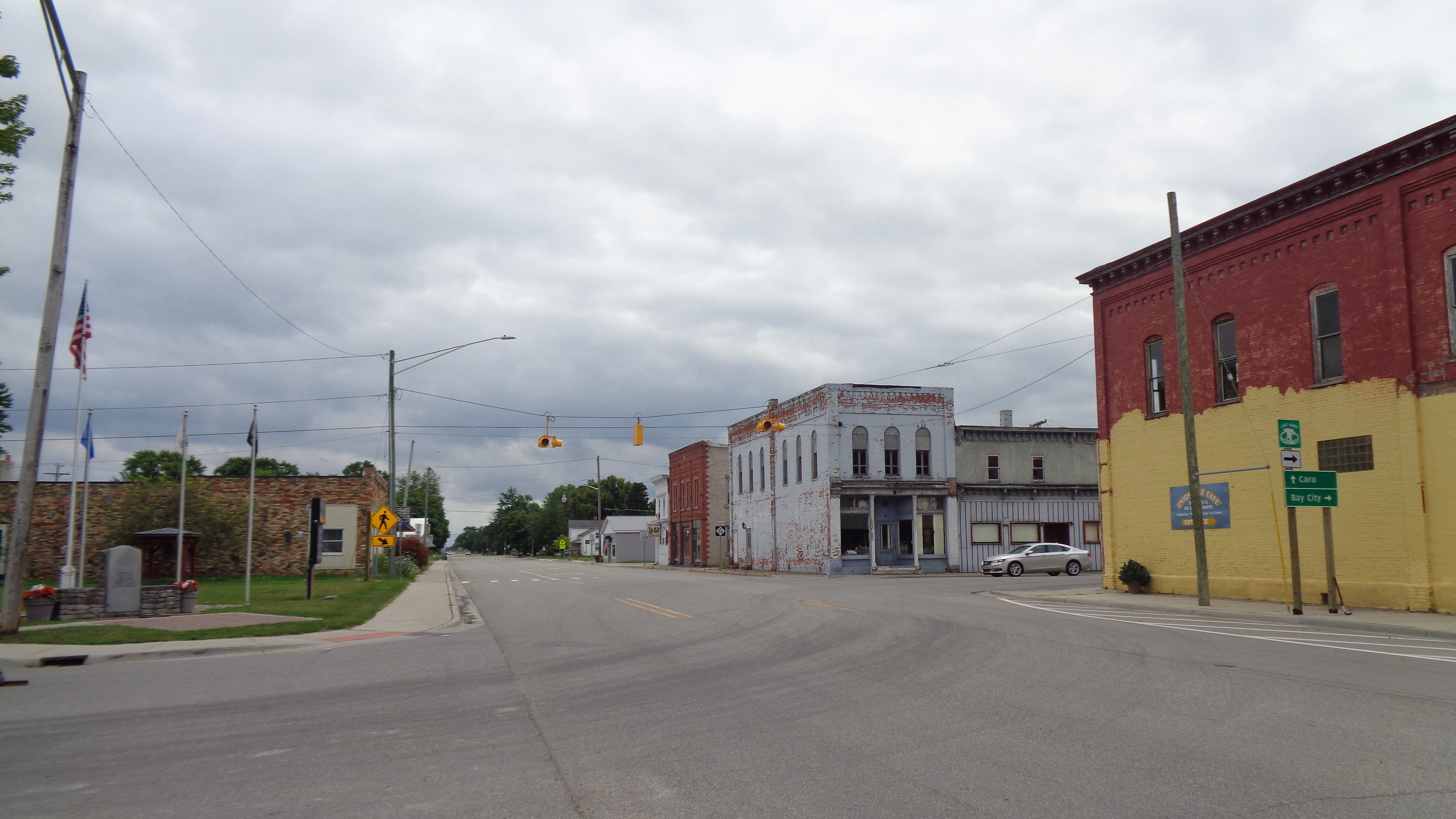
- Intersection of M-25 and terminus of M-24

- Location of Unionville, Michigan
- Coordinates: 43°39′15″N 83°28′6″W
- Country: United States
- State: Michigan
- County: Tuscola

Area
  - Total: 0.94 sq mi (2.43 km^{2})
  - Land: 0.94 sq mi (2.43 km^{2})
  - Water: 0 sq mi (0.00 km^{2})
- Elevation: 620 ft (189 m)

Population (2020)
  - Total: 481
  - Density: 512.2/sq mi (197.77/km^{2})
- Time zone: UTC-5 (Eastern (EST))
  - Summer (DST): UTC-4 (EDT)
- ZIP code: 48767
- Area code: 989
- FIPS code: 26-81420
- GNIS feature ID: 1615362
- Website: www.unionvillemi.us

Unionville is a village in Tuscola County, Michigan, United States. As of the 2020 census, Unionville had a population of 481. The village is located in the northwestern corner of Columbia Township.

== Geography ==
- According to the United States Census Bureau, the village has a total area of 0.94 square miles (2.43 km^{2}), all land.
- It is considered to be part of the Thumb of Michigan, which in turn is a subregion of the Flint/Tri-Cities.

== Demographics ==
Historical population
Census	Pop.	Note	%±
1890	414		—
1900	427		3.1%
1910	456		6.8%
1920	488		7.0%
1930	478		−2.0%
1940	500		4.6%
1950	531		6.2%
1960	629		18.5%
1970	647		2.9%
1980	578		−10.7%
1990	590		2.1%
2000	605		2.5%
2010	508		−16.0%
2020	481		−5.3%
U.S. Decennial Census

=== 2010 census ===
As of the census of 2010, there were 508 people, 218 households, and 154 families living in the village. The population density was 540.4 inhabitants per square mile (208.6/km^{2}). There were 236 housing units at an average density of 251.1 per square mile (97.0/km^{2}). The racial makeup of the village was 97.6% White, 0.2% Asian, 0.8% from other races, and 1.4% from two or more races. Hispanic or Latino of any race were 3.0% of the population.

There were 218 households, of which 26.1% had children under the age of 18 living with them, 57.8% were married couples living together, 9.2% had a female householder with no husband present, 3.7% had a male householder with no wife present, and 29.4% were non-families. 27.1% of all households were made up of individuals, and 11.1% had someone living alone who was 65 years of age or older. The average household size was 2.33 and the average family size was 2.81.

The median age in the village was 43.6 years. 20.9% of residents were under the age of 18; 6.4% were between the ages of 18 and 24; 24.6% were from 25 to 44; 31% were from 45 to 64; and 17.1% were 65 years of age or older. The gender makeup of the village was 49.2% male and 50.8% female.

=== 2000 census ===
As of the census of 2000, there were 605 people, 231 households, and 170 families living in the village. The population density was 652.2 inhabitants per square mile (251.8/km^{2}). There were 246 housing units at an average density of 265.2 per square mile (102.4/km^{2}). The racial makeup of the village was 97.02% White, 0.83% Asian, 0.33% from other races, and 1.82% from two or more races. Hispanic or Latino of any race were 2.81% of the population.

There were 231 households, out of which 37.2% had children under the age of 18 living with them, 58.9% were married couples living together, 11.7% had a female householder with no husband present, and 26.4% were non-families. 22.9% of all households were made up of individuals, and 10.0% had someone living alone who was 65 years of age or older. The average household size was 2.62 and the average family size was 3.11.

In the village, the population was spread out, with 28.1% under the age of 18, 9.3% from 18 to 24, 27.6% from 25 to 44, 20.8% from 45 to 64, and 14.2% who were 65 years of age or older. The median age was 35 years. For every 100 females, there were 93.3 males. For every 100 females age 18 and over, there were 87.5 males.

The median income for a household in the village was $37,500, and the median income for a family was $44,375. Males had a median income of $33,583 versus $21,458 for females. The per capita income for the village was $18,490. About 8.2% of families and 11.8% of the population were below the poverty line, including 26.5% of those under age 18 and 4.7% of those age 65 or over.
