= Fairgrove, Michigan =

- Village
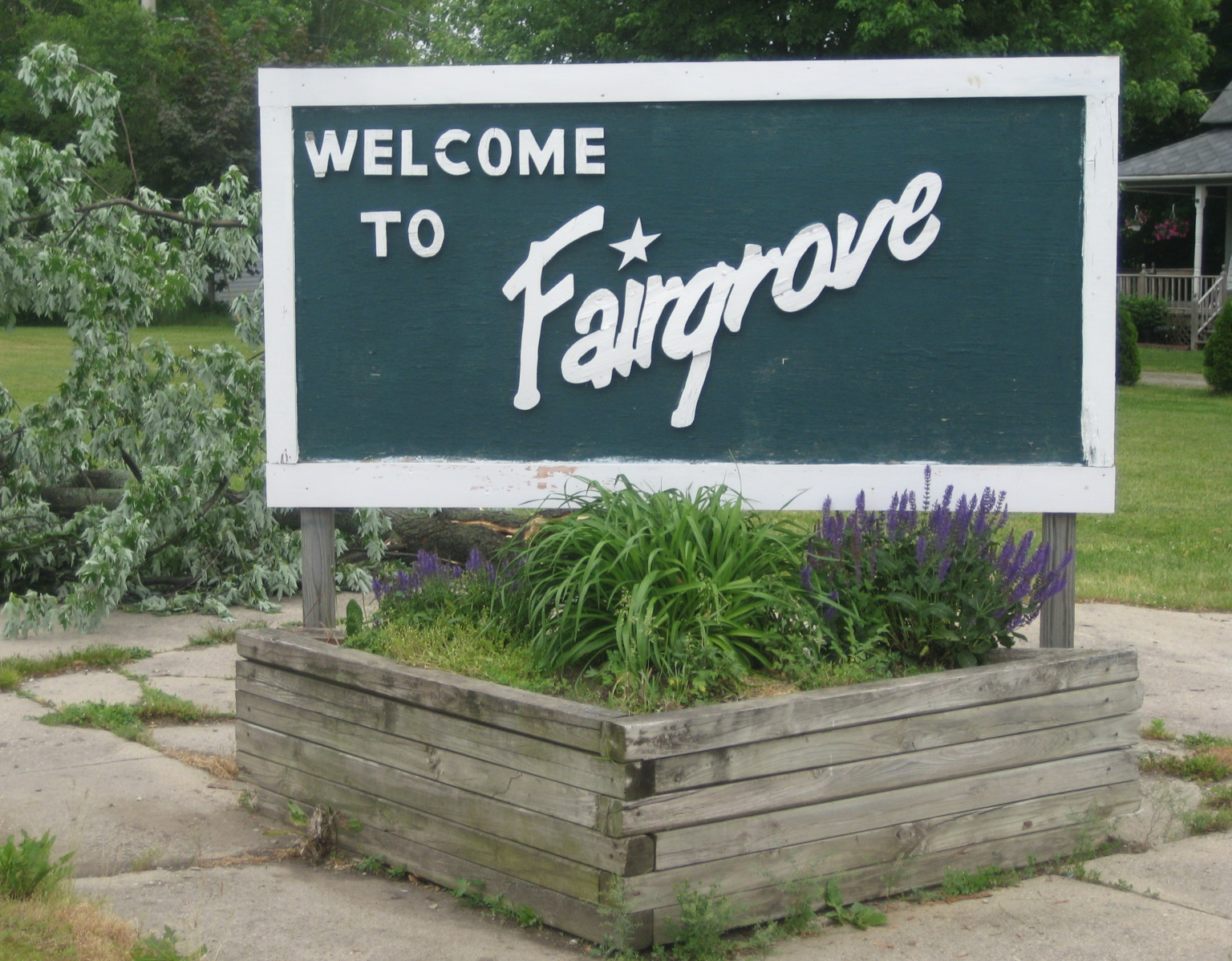
- Fairgrove Michigan sign along M-138

- Location of Fairgrove, Michigan
- Coordinates: 43°31′35″N 83°32′41″W
- Country: United States
- State: Michigan
- County: Tuscola

Area
  - Total: 1.12 sq mi (2.90 km^{2})
  - Land: 1.12 sq mi (2.90 km^{2})
  - Water: 0 sq mi (0.00 km^{2})
- Elevation: 659 ft (201 m)

Population (2020)
  - Total: 514
  - Density: 458.4/sq mi (176.97/km^{2})
- Time zone: UTC-5 (Eastern (EST))
  - Summer (DST): UTC-4 (EDT)
- ZIP code: 48733
- Area code: 989
- FIPS code: 26-27080
- GNIS feature ID: 0625751
- Website: https://villageoffairgrove.org/

Fairgrove is a village in Tuscola County in the U.S. state of Michigan. As of the 2020 census, Fairgrove had a population of 514. The village is located within Fairgrove Township.

== Early history ==
The settlement of Fairgrove dates back to June 1852 when Amzy Clay bought acreage from Patrick McGlone of neighboring Juniata Township, Michigan. The land surrounding Fairgrove was level, sloping slightly to the northwest. The soil was ideal for farming, although many drainage projects were necessary to rid the area of its large mosquito population. Forest lands enclosed the township with stands of beech, maple, elm and basswood occurring in groves, giving the town its name. No roads into or out of the township existed at the time and Mr. Clay along with his father, Henry Clay, Jacob Winchell, Erastus A. Marr, David Gorter, a Mr. Blank, Patrick McGlone and Joseph R. McGlone hacked through five and a half miles of densely crowded forest to connect the new township with neighboring communities. Settlement did not begin in earnest until the following spring when several new families moved into the township.

Before the township was given a name it was designated as township 13 North, of Range 8 East by the State of Michigan. Three years later, on December 31, 1855, at a meeting of the board of supervisors the township was officially given the name of Fair Grove. The first school district organized for the township was the Hinson District, named for then resident D.P. Hinson. The first school house was built in the spring of 1856 and was run by Caroline E. Stoddard, of Rogers.

Fairgrove first received a post office in 1881 after a railroad was built here. It was incorporated in 1901.

== Geography ==
According to the United States Census Bureau, the village has a total area of 1.12 square miles (2.90 km^{2}), all land.

== Demographics ==
Historical population
Census	Pop.	Note	%±
1910	437		—
1920	452		3.4%
1930	437		−3.3%
1940	481		10.1%
1950	570		18.5%
1960	609		6.8%
1970	629		3.3%
1980	691		9.9%
1990	592		−14.3%
2000	627		5.9%
2010	563		−10.2%
2020	514		−8.7%
U.S. Decennial Census

=== 2010 census ===
As of the census of 2010, there were 563 people, 225 households, and 154 families residing in the village. The population density was 502.7 inhabitants per square mile (194.1/km^{2}). There were 257 housing units at an average density of 229.5 per square mile (88.6/km^{2}). The racial makeup of the village was 96.4% White, 0.4% African American, 1.1% Native American, 1.2% from other races, and 0.9% from two or more races. Hispanic or Latino of any race were 3.9% of the population.

There were 225 households, of which 34.2% had children under the age of 18 living with them, 47.6% were married couples living together, 18.7% had a female householder with no husband present, 2.2% had a male householder with no wife present, and 31.6% were non-families. 28.0% of all households were made up of individuals, and 8.9% had someone living alone who was 65 years of age or older. The average household size was 2.48 and the average family size was 3.03.

The median age in the village was 37.3 years. 27.7% of residents were under the age of 18; 7% were between the ages of 18 and 24; 23.7% were from 25 to 44; 28.7% were from 45 to 64; and 12.8% were 65 years of age or older. The gender makeup of the village was 50.8% male and 49.2% female.

=== 2000 census ===
As of the census of 2000, there were 627 people, 238 households, and 169 families residing in the village. The population density was 572.1 inhabitants per square mile (220.9/km^{2}). There were 260 housing units at an average density of 237.2 per square mile (91.6/km^{2}). The racial makeup of the village was 93.46% White, 0.32% African American, 1.12% Native American, 0.32% Asian, 2.23% from other races, and 2.55% from two or more races. Hispanic or Latino of any race were 7.34% of the population.

There were 238 households, out of which 32.8% had children under the age of 18 living with them, 56.7% were married couples living together, 10.5% had a female householder with no husband present, and 28.6% were non-families. 26.1% of all households were made up of individuals, and 8.8% had someone living alone who was 65 years of age or older. The average household size was 2.58 and the average family size was 3.09.

In the village, the population was spread out, with 27.8% under the age of 18, 8.3% from 18 to 24, 28.5% from 25 to 44, 22.8% from 45 to 64, and 12.6% who were 65 years of age or older. The median age was 35 years. For every 100 females, there were 92.3 males. For every 100 females age 18 and over, there were 90.3 males.

The median income for a household in the village was $35,391, and the median income for a family was $38,929. Males had a median income of $31,484 versus $21,719 for females. The per capita income for the village was $17,741. About 4.8% of families and 7.8% of the population were below the poverty line, including 7.4% of those under age 18 and none of those age 65 or over.

=== 1880 census ===
Population, 1,609. In 1882 the number of acres assessed was 22,706; total equalized valuation of real and personal property was $476,815; number of farms in 1881, 242; acres of improved land, 8,222; bushels of wheat in 1880, 39,582; of corn, 67,643; tons of hay, 1,204.

=== 1874 Michigan state census ===
Population, 1,056; bushels of wheat raised, 5,900; bushels of corn raised, 17,747; bushels of potatoes, 10,774; tons of hay cut, 1,580.

=== 1870 census ===
Population, 928; number of farms, 128; voters, 185; pounds of wool sheared, 3,345; pounds of butter made, 43,790; bushels of wheat raised, 6,677; bushels of potatoes raised, 8,489; tons of hay cut, 1,233; bushels of corn raised, 4,726; bushels of oats raised, 7,175.

=== 1860 census ===
Population, 367; families, 91; dwellings, 91; number of occupied farms, 87; number of acres improved, 1,398; number of horses, 15; number of cows, 114; bushels of wheat-raised, 1,396; bushels of rye raised, 48; bushels of corn raised, 1,363; bushels of oats raised, 1,082; bushels of potatoes raised, 1,325; pounds of butter made, 5,940.

== Local events ==
The Michigan Bean Festival is held in Fairgrove on Labor Day weekend, although nearby Kinde was renowned as the "Bean Capital of the World". Michigan Bean Soup has been a staple for over one hundred years in the U.S. Senate dining room.

== Photo gallery ==
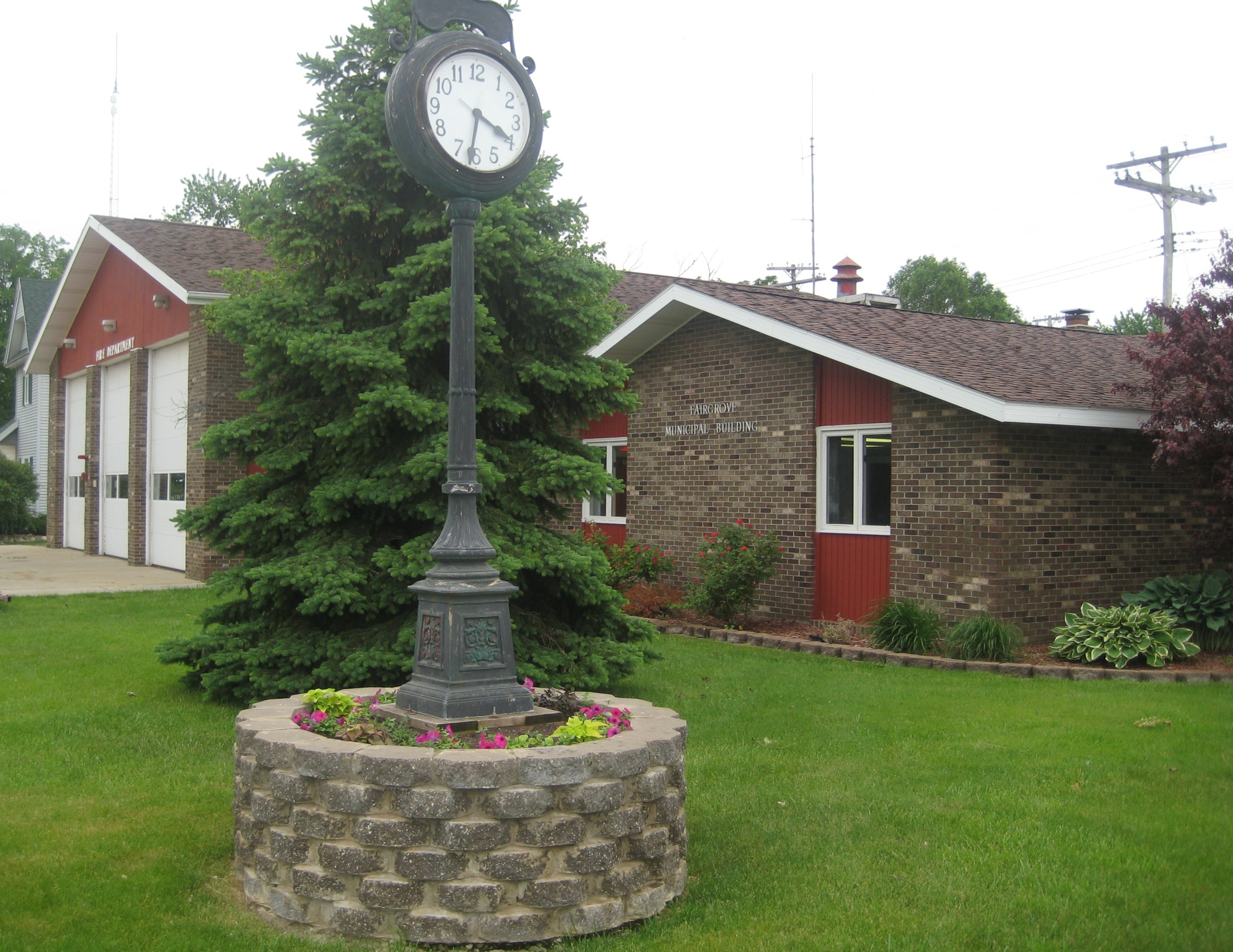
Clock in front of Municipal building

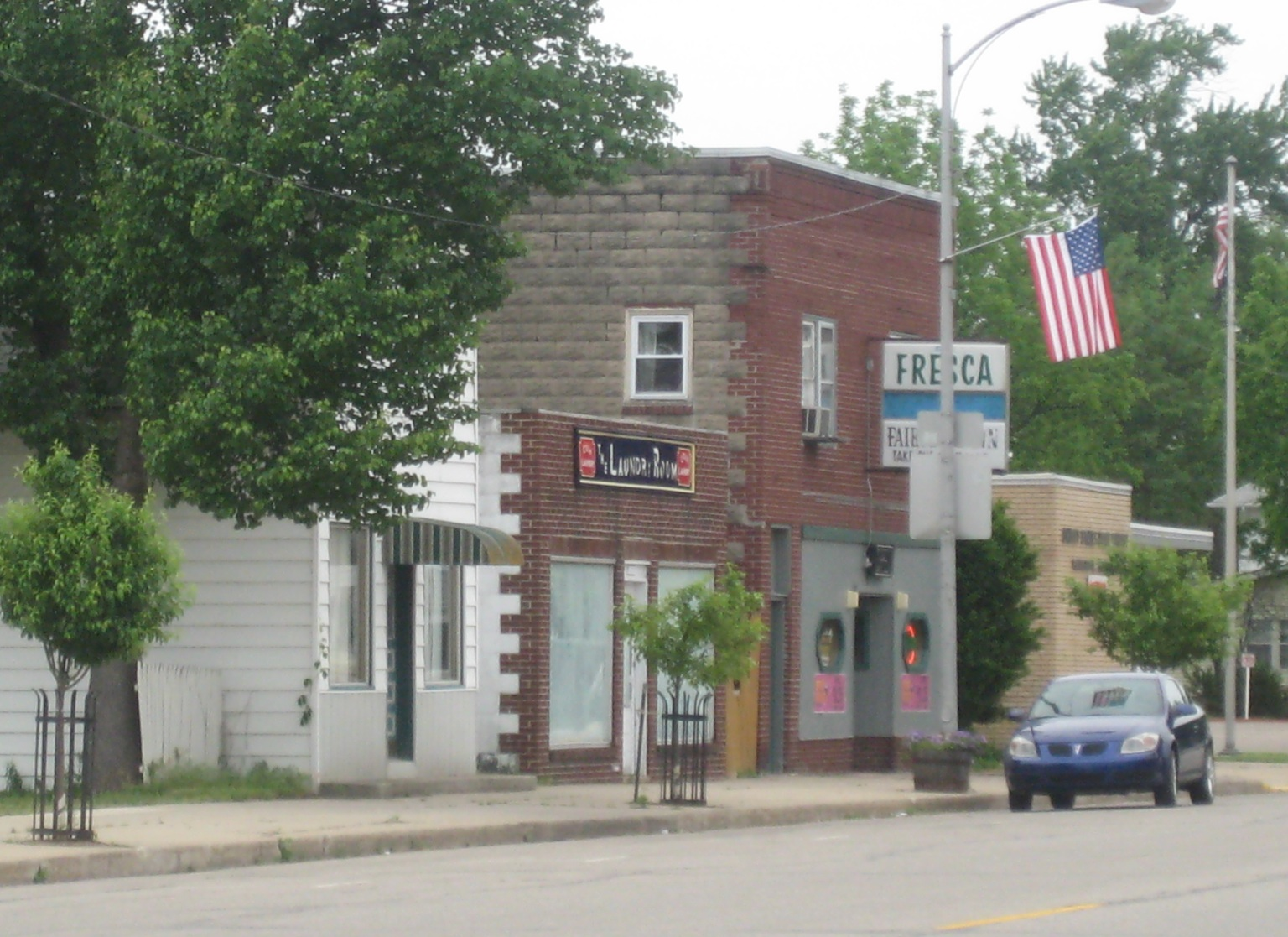
Buildings along Main Street M-138
