= Akron, Michigan =

- Village
- Village of Akron
- Location within Tuscola County

- Location within the state of Michigan Location within the United States
- Coordinates: 43°34′00″N 83°30′51″W
- Country: United States
- State: Michigan
- County: Tuscola
- Townships: Akron and Fairgrove
- Settled: 1854
- Incorporated: 1910

Government
  - Type: Village council
  - President: Roxanne Huizar
  - Clerk: Chuckie Wilson

Area
  - Total: 0.94 sq mi (2.44 km^{2})
  - Land: 0.94 sq mi (2.44 km^{2})
  - Water: 0 sq mi (0.00 km^{2})
- Elevation: 640 ft (195 m)

Population (2020)
  - Total: 349
  - Density: 371.28/sq mi (143.35/km^{2})
- Time zone: UTC-5 (Eastern (EST))
  - Summer (DST): UTC-4 (EDT)
- ZIP code(s): 48701
- Area code: 989
- FIPS code: 26-00700
- GNIS feature ID: 2397920
- Website: Official website

Akron is a village in Tuscola County of the U.S. state of Michigan. The population was 349 at the 2020 census.

The village is located on the boundary between Akron Township on the north and Fairgrove Township on the south, with the village area approximately evenly split between the two. The Akron post office, with ZIP code 48701, also serves the southern and western portions of Akron Township, as well as portions of northern Fairgrove Township, most of eastern Wisner Township, and smaller portions of western Columbia Township and Almer Township.

== History ==
Akron was settled by Charles H. Beach in 1854. It was originally known as Beach's Corners. It was renamed Akron at the time a post office was established in 1857.

== Geography ==
According to the United States Census Bureau, the village has a total area of 0.94 square miles (2.43 km^{2}), all land.

== Demographics ==
Historical population
Census	Pop.	Note	%±
1920	505		—
1930	441		−12.7%
1940	413		−6.3%
1950	431		4.4%
1960	503		16.7%
1970	525		4.4%
1980	538		2.5%
1990	421		−21.7%
2000	461		9.5%
2010	402		−12.8%
2020	349		−13.2%
U.S. Decennial Census

=== 2010 census ===
As of the census of 2010, there were 402 people, 160 households, and 105 families residing in the village. The population density was 427.7 inhabitants per square mile (165.1/km^{2}). There were 182 housing units at an average density of 193.6 per square mile (74.7/km^{2}). The racial makeup of the village was 96.3% White, 0.2% Native American, 0.5% from other races, and 3.0% from two or more races. Hispanic or Latino of any race were 6.2% of the population.

There were 160 households, of which 35.0% had children under the age of 18 living with them, 41.9% were married couples living together, 14.4% had a female householder with no husband present, 9.4% had a male householder with no wife present, and 34.4% were non-families. 28.1% of all households were made up of individuals, and 12.5% had someone living alone who was 65 years of age or older. The average household size was 2.48 and the average family size was 3.05.

The median age in the village was 34.8 years. 27.9% of residents were under the age of 18; 5.5% were between the ages of 18 and 24; 29.2% were from 25 to 44; 21.6% were from 45 to 64; and 15.7% were 65 years of age or older. The gender makeup of the village was 48.5% male and 51.5% female.

=== 2000 census ===
As of the census of 2000, there were 461 people, 173 households, and 125 families residing in the village. The population density was 483.5 inhabitants per square mile (186.7/km^{2}). There were 188 housing units at an average density of 197.2 per square mile (76.1/km^{2}). The racial makeup of the village was 97.61% White, 0.22% Native American, 0.43% from other races, and 1.74% from two or more races. Hispanic or Latino of any race were 6.07% of the population.

There were 173 households, out of which 35.3% had children under the age of 18 living with them, 52.6% were married couples living together, 13.3% had a female householder with no husband present, and 27.7% were non-families. 23.7% of all households were made up of individuals, and 10.4% had someone living alone who was 65 years of age or older. The average household size was 2.64 and the average family size was 3.06.

In the village, the population was spread out, with 29.7% under the age of 18, 6.9% from 18 to 24, 30.6% from 25 to 44, 18.2% from 45 to 64, and 14.5% who were 65 years of age or older. The median age was 35 years. For every 100 females, there were 85.1 males. For every 100 females age 18 and over, there were 82.0 males.

The median income for a household in the village was $35,208, and the median income for a family was $35,313. Males had a median income of $31,806 versus $23,295 for females. The per capita income for the village was $14,570. About 12.2% of families and 17.1% of the population were below the poverty line, including 26.2% of those under age 18 and none of those age 65 or over.
