= Denmark Township, Michigan =

- Township
- Location within the state of Michigan
- Coordinates: 43°25′44″N 83°39′51″W
- Country: United States
- State: Michigan
- County: Tuscola

Area
  - Total: 35.3 sq mi (91.3 km^{2})
  - Land: 35.3 sq mi (91.3 km^{2})
  - Water: 0 sq mi (0.0 km^{2})
- Elevation: 646 ft (197 m)

Population (2020)
  - Total: 2,741
  - Density: 77.8/sq mi (30.0/km^{2})
- Time zone: UTC-5 (Eastern (EST))
  - Summer (DST): UTC-4 (EDT)
- FIPS code: 26-21600
- GNIS feature ID: 1626176
- Website: https://denmarktownshipmi.gov/

Denmark Township is a civil township of Tuscola County in the U.S. state of Michigan. The population was 2,741 at the 2020 census.

Denmark Township was organized in 1853.

== Communities ==
- Carr's Corners was in the eastern part of the township. It was established in 1854 and had a post office from 1862 until 1900.
- Denmark Junction is a location with the township at the railroad junction north of M-46 between Quanicassee and Bradford Roads (43°24′57″N 83°39′18″W).
- The village of Reese is in the northwest corner of the township on M-81.
- Richville (formerly called Frankenhilf) is a small unincorporated community in the southwest corner of the township at 43°24′33″N 83°40′38″W. It is at the junction of M-15 and M-46. Vassar is a few miles southeast on M-15; Reese is a few miles to the north by county roads; I-75 is seven miles (11 km) west on M-46, and Saginaw is just west of I-75; and Bay City is about 15 miles (24 km) northwest on M-15. The ZIP code is 48758.

== Geography ==
According to the United States Census Bureau, the township has a total area of 35.3 square miles (91 km^{2}), all land.

== Demographics ==
As of the census of 2000, there were 3,249 people, 1,265 households, and 934 families residing in the township. The population density was 92.1 inhabitants per square mile (35.6/km^{2}). There were 1,327 housing units at an average density of 37.6 per square mile (14.5/km^{2}). The racial makeup of the township was 97.01% White, 0.03% African American, 0.18% Native American, 1.23% Asian, 0.55% from other races, and 0.98% from two or more races. Hispanic or Latino of any race were 2.43% of the population.

There were 1,265 households, out of which 33.3% had children under the age of 18 living with them, 62.2% were married couples living together, 8.4% had a female householder with no husband present, and 26.1% were non-families. 23.7% of all households were made up of individuals, and 10.7% had someone living alone who was 65 years of age or older. The average household size was 2.56 and the average family size was 3.01.

In the township the population was spread out, with 25.8% under the age of 18, 8.8% from 18 to 24, 27.0% from 25 to 44, 25.1% from 45 to 64, and 13.4% who were 65 years of age or older. The median age was 37 years. For every 100 females, there were 100.7 males. For every 100 females age 18 and over, there were 92.0 males.

The median income for a household in the township was $41,366, and the median income for a family was $50,417. Males had a median income of $38,352 versus $26,083 for females. The per capita income for the township was $19,782. About 3.4% of families and 4.8% of the population were below the poverty line, including 4.5% of those under age 18 and 6.5% of those age 65 or over.
