= Reese, Michigan =

- Village
- Location of Reese, Michigan
- Coordinates: 43°27′10″N 83°41′22″W
- Country: United States
- State: Michigan
- Counties: Saginaw, Tuscola

Area
  - Total: 1.35 sq mi (3.50 km^{2})
  - Land: 1.35 sq mi (3.50 km^{2})
  - Water: 0 sq mi (0.00 km^{2})
- Elevation: 620 ft (190 m)

Population (2020)
  - Total: 1,261
  - Density: 932.4/sq mi (360.02/km^{2})
- Time zone: UTC-5 (Eastern (EST))
  - Summer (DST): UTC-4 (EDT)
- ZIP code: 48757
- Area code: 989
- FIPS code: 26-67900
- GNIS feature ID: 2399055
- Website: https://www.villageofreese.net/

Reese is a village in Tuscola and Saginaw counties in the U.S. state of Michigan. Located almost entirely in Tuscola County's Denmark Township, the village includes only a tiny portion of Blumfield Township in Saginaw County. As of the 2020 census, Reese had a population of 1,261.

== Geography ==
According to the United States Census Bureau, the village has a total area of 1.35 square miles (3.50 km^{2}), all land.

== History ==
The area of what is the village of Reese today was first settled in 1865 when Mrs. Louisa Woodruff and her son built the first home (near the current intersection of Reese and Saginaw roads.) The Saginaw-Watrousville plank road was opened in 1871, which increased access to the community from Saginaw and the surrounding area. In 1873, the Detroit and Bay City railroads were built and Hudson B. Blackman plotted a tract of land adjacent to the original community (near the current intersection of Saginaw and Meridian streets) and named it Reese, in honor of Alvin H. Reese the railroad superintendent.

William B. Stark was born in 1831 in New York and came to Denmark, Tuscola County, in 1865. Six brothers and one sister came to live with him in the following years. They lived in tents in the dense forest of the area in what is now Camp Street. In 1873, William's brother, Joseph, came to the area and opened a hotel near the corner of Reese and Saginaw roads. He was the fourth family to move to the area, with the others being his brother, the Woodruffs, and the Rogerses.

In the fall of 1865, A.W. Gates, a stage proprietor from Saginaw, established a plank road from East Saginaw, through Reese, and into Watrousville. In 1871, Gates established a mail and stage route along the plank road. Gates kept his express and stage offices in Rogers’ hotel. The post office was also in Rogers’ hotel. The post office was named Gates in 1871 after the man responsible for its establishment. In the fall of 1871, Daniel Woodruff opened a grocery and provision store across the street from the hotel, and George Melatt and Archie Scott opened a blacksmith shop. In September 1872, Asenath M. Rogers, Roberts’ wife, surveyed and platted eleven acres and called it Gates.

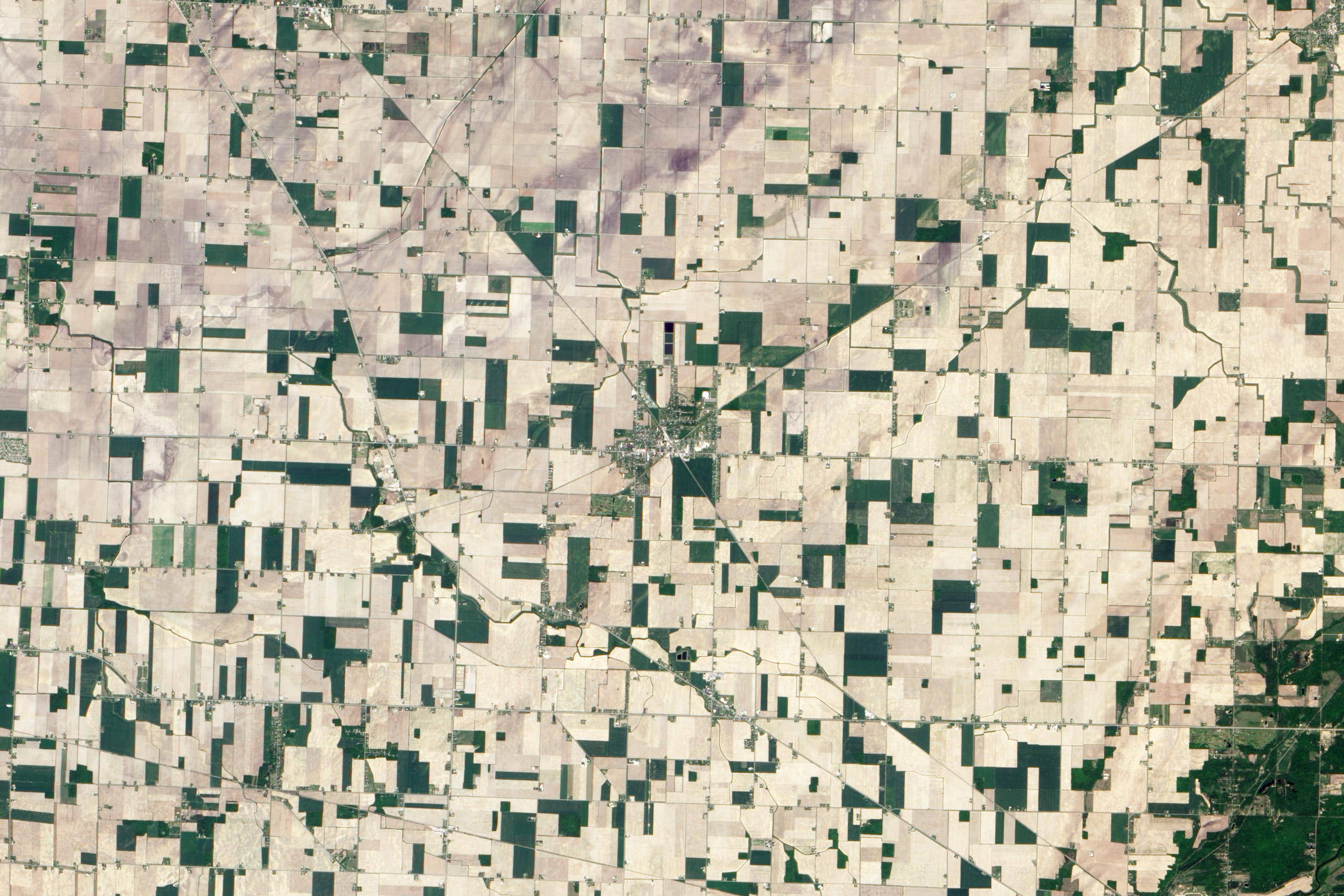
Acquired by the Advanced Land Imager (ALI) on NASA's Earth Observing-1 (EO-1) satellite, the image shows the town on May 21, 2012.

In 1873, G. W. Reese brought the Detroit & Bay City Railroad through the town. Hudson B. Blackman then platted a tract of land adjoining Gates, and called it Reese, in honor of the railroad superintendent. The station, post office and town were then renamed after him. Thomas Haniford and Michael Doyle probably worked for that same railroad, and Eustius Gall, born in Switzerland, was an engineer. Blackman also donated the right–of–way and grounds on which the depot sat.

In 1875, Aseneth Rogers surveyed and platted an addition to the village of Gates. With the railroad station at the east end of town being called Reese, the post office of Gates at the west end eventually merged, the entire village and surrounding area becoming known as Reese.

In 1905 Gatestown was a common name of the west end of the community, still in use in 1915 and as late as 1940.

The village grew rapidly and within five years had a population of more than 300. In 1877, Reese was described as the railroad and trading point for a large section of farming country. Along with transporting people to and from the area the railroad would also transport timber, limestone and produce to markets throughout Michigan. In the early 1900s, the railroad also was used by local farmers to ship hogs and cattle to Detroit. Stages were also running daily from Saginaw to Caro. The depot served both railroads, as two train order boards were present. (One on a mast for the NYC and one on the building for the PM). Reese Crossing was not an interlocking but it was protected by a target that was set by approaching train crews. The east–west route is that of the Pere Marquette, and the north–south route going by the grain elevator is the Michigan Central branch line between Denmark Jct. and Bay City. The target was set vertical for a Michigan Central movement on the Denmark Jct. Branch.

In 1946, the C&O Railway purchased the line. In 1985 the C&O combined with B&O to form CSX Transportation. In 1988, Huron and Eastern Railway purchased the rail line which is still in operation today. In 1993, Reese celebrated 120 years of rail service. Reese area farmers are one of the Huron & Eastern Railway's major shippers. Even today the farming success depends on efficient use of the rail system.

The first school meeting in the area was held in April 1866 and school was taught in a lumber shanty. There were 200 children of school age in the district. The original Reese School was built in 1880. The left side of the building was the original structure which was remodeled and increased in size in 1912. On April 25, 1913, a student set fire to the school and it burned to the ground. A new school was built in 1914 at a cost of $10,231. That structure remained, with renovations and additions, until it was torn down in 1962. it was replaced by the present middle school building which was erected from 1957 to 1966. In 1972, the gymnasium was refaced. At that time, the building housed both middle school and high school aged students. The present elementary school was built in 1957 and housed the lower grades. Total district enrollment was 1,308 students. The current Reese High School as built at a cost of $3,195,000 and opened for the 1976–77 school year housing grades 9–12. The middle school housed grades 6–8, with grades K-5 in the present elementary building. Total enrollment for the district was 1,358 students. The middle school closed at the end of the 2014–15 school year, with students moving into the high school building. RMS went up for sale in 2015 but after a year of no purchase agreements, it was demolished in 2016. There are also two parochial elementary schools that serve the district. In 1971, 44 teachers from the elementary and high school went on strike. After refusal to go back to work, the Reese Board of Education fired all 44. Reese 44 members were the first teachers in Michigan fired for demanding a fair contract by striking. This produced the phrase "Remember the Reese 44".

The area continues to be largely agricultural. Corn, soybeans, navy beans, and sugar beets are the major crops produced. There is very little dairy or other livestock.

== Demographics ==
Historical population
| Census | Pop. | Note | %± |
|---|---|---|---|
| 1900 | 416 | | — |
| 1910 | 465 | | 11.8% |
| 1920 | 459 | | −1.3% |
| 1930 | 490 | | 6.8% |
| 1940 | 569 | | 16.1% |
| 1950 | 632 | | 11.1% |
| 1960 | 711 | | 12.5% |
| 1970 | 1,050 | | 47.7% |
| 1980 | 1,645 | | 56.7% |
| 1990 | 1,414 | | −14.0% |
| 2000 | 1,375 | | −2.8% |
| 2010 | 1,454 | | 5.7% |
| 2020 | 1,261 | | −13.3% |
U.S. Decennial Census

=== 2010 census ===
As of the census of 2010, there were 1,454 people, 635 households, and 418 families residing in the village. The population density was 1,077.0 inhabitants per square mile (415.8/km^{2}). There were 690 housing units at an average density of 511.1 per square mile (197.3/km^{2}). The racial makeup of the village was 97.2% White, 0.7% African American, 0.2% Native American, 0.7% Asian, 0.8% from other races, and 0.4% from two or more races. Hispanic or Latino of any race were 4.3% of the population.

There were 635 households, of which 27.4% had children under the age of 18 living with them, 50.9% were married couples living together, 11.3% had a female householder with no husband present, 3.6% had a male householder with no wife present, and 34.2% were non-families. 30.4% of all households were made up of individuals, and 14% had someone living alone who was 65 years of age or older. The average household size was 2.29 and the average family size was 2.84.

The median age in the village was 42.8 years. 22.6% of residents were under the age of 18; 7.3% were between the ages of 18 and 24; 22.7% were from 25 to 44; 29.2% were from 45 to 64; and 18.1% were 65 years of age or older. The gender makeup of the village was 47.1% male and 52.9% female.

=== 2000 census ===
At the 2000 census, there were 1,375 people, 591 households and 397 families residing in the village. The population density was 1,195.8 inhabitants per square mile (461.7/km^{2}). There were 627 housing units at an average density of 545.3 per square mile (210.5/km^{2}). The racial makeup of the village was 98.47% White, 0.07% African American, 0.29% Native American, 0.07% Asian, 0.29% from other races, and 0.80% from two or more races. Hispanic or Latino of any race were 1.82% of the population. Reese's ancestral background is mainly German with 51%. 10% are Polish, 9% English, 9% French, 8% Irish and 4% from the United States.

There were 591 households, of which 28.3% had children under the age of 18 living with them, 54.7% were married couples living together, 9.8% had a female householder with no husband present, and 32.7% were non-families. 29.8% of all households were made up of individuals, and 12.7% had someone living alone who was 65 years of age or older. The average household size was 2.33 and the average family size was 2.86.

22.5% of the population were under the age of 18, 9.5% from 18 to 24, 25.8% from 25 to 44, 28.1% from 45 to 64, and 14.0% who were 65 years of age or older. The median age was 40 years. For every 100 females, there were 95.0 males. For every 100 females age 18 and over, there were 84.9 males.

The median household income was $40,469 and the median family income was $50,556. Males had a median income of $40,938 compared with $25,250 for females. The per capita income for the village was $22,498. About 3.2% of families and 4.6% of the population were below the poverty line, including 3.6% of those under age 18 and 8.6% of those age 65 or over.

== Education ==
Reese Public Schools operates public schools. Reese Elementary School houses kindergarten through fifth grade and Reese High School houses sixth through twelfth grades. In addition, Reese also has two parochial schoolsL: St. Elizabeth is a Catholic School that has grades kindergarten through eighth and Trinity Lutheran also has grades kindergarten through eighth. Nearby Richville, also in the Reese Public Schools district, has St. Michael's Lutheran School, housing kindergarten through eighth grade.
