= List of Michigan State Historic Sites in Tuscola County =

Location of Tuscola County in Michigan

The following is a list of Michigan State Historic Sites in Tuscola County, Michigan. Sites marked with a dagger (†) are also listed on the National Register of Historic Places in Tuscola County, Michigan.

== Current listings ==
Name	Image	Location	City	Listing date
Anson Berney Home		4243 South Seeger	Cass City	July 26, 1974
Richard C. Burtis House†		2163 South Ringle Road	Watrousville	November 15, 1973
Caro Masonic Temple		156 North State Street, between E Frank and E Lincoln streets	Caro	October 23, 2986
William H. Carson House		604 West Burnside	Caro	April 11, 1977
Dorus Healy Clark Farm		1417 Luder Road	Almer Township	December 5, 1996
Community of Frankenhilf Informational Site		3455 South Van Buren Street	Richville	June 6, 1977
Elkland Township Hall		1 building east of the Northeast corner of West and Main streets	Cass City	August 3, 1979
First Presbyterian Church Informational Designation		215 North Almer Street	Caro	August 22, 1985
First Presbyterian Church†		6505 Church Street	Cass City	2009
First United Methodist Church of Vassar		133 North Main Street	Vassar	July 26, 1974
Edwin G. Fox House (Demolished)		43 Turner Street	Mayville	July 26, 1974
Gilford United Methodist Church		35 North Bradleyville Road, N of Gilford Road	Reese	January 19, 1989
Hotel Columbia†		194 East Huron Avenue	Vassar	April 20, 1989
Indian Dave Stocker Informational Designation		Bay City-Forestville Road (M-25), east of Conger Road	Wisner Township	December 12, 1979
William Kirk Home		2106 Main Street	Fairgrove	July 26, 1974
J. C. Laing Home		4391 South Seeger	Cass City	July 26, 1974
Silas A. Lane House		301 Prospect Street	Vassar	February 11, 1972
A. B. Markham House		6795 Fulton Street	Mayville	July 26, 1974
I. J. B. McKenney House		2987 East Caro Road (M-81)	Ellington Township	January 16, 1990
McKinley School†		510 Butler Street	Vassar	October 1, 1971
Michigan's Bean Production		Roadside Park on M-46	Richville	February 12, 1959
Miller Grist Mill		136 Spring Street	Vassar	July 26, 1974
Miller Opera House		100 South Main	Vassar	July 26, 1974
Millington Bank Building†		8534 State Road	Millington	April 18, 1996
Millington School District No. 2 Commemorative Designation		Gleason Street at the corner of Millington Street	Millington	February 17, 1994
Moravian Church		2711 Cass	Unionville	January 21, 1974
Townsend North House†		325 North Main Street	Vassar	February 22, 1974
Peninsular Sugar Company		725 S Alomor Street	Caro	July 26, 1974
Port Huron & Northwestern-Pere Marquette Rail Depot Mayville		2112 Ohmer Road (M-24)	Mayville vicinity	June 10, 1987
Purdy Bank Building		4761 State Street	Gagetown	July 26, 1974
The Purdy Barn		6948 Richie Rd	Gagetown	August 12, 1977
William Randall House†		5927 Treasurer Road	Mayville vicinity	November 15, 1973
Mathias Ringle House		Northwest corner of Ringle and Deckerville roads	Fairgrove vicinity	July 26, 1974
Seventh Day Adventist Church		328 Prospect	Vassar	July 26, 1974
Smith House†		113-115 Prospect Street	Vassar	October 1, 1971
St. Agatha	St. Agatha-Gagetown	4618 South St.	Gagetown	January 21, 2015
Trinity Episcopal Church†		106 Joy Street	Caro	December 18, 1974
The Tuscola Advertiser Informational Designation		344 North State Street	Caro	July 17, 1986
Tuscola Community Church		8951 Church Street	Tuscola	July 26, 1974
Tuscola County Courthouse†		440 North State Street	Caro	November 16, 1982
Tuscola County Fairgrounds		700 South Almer Street	Caro	May 13, 1981
Old Unionville High School Building		Church Street	Unionville	July 26, 1974
Vassar Pioneer Times Building		101 South Main Street	Vassar	July 26, 1974
Vassar Theater		140 East Huron Street (M-15)	Vassar	May 17, 1988
Vassar's Logging Era Informational Designation		Intersection of West Huron and West Street	Vassar	March 23, 1965
Watrous General Store†		4607 West Caro Road	Watrousville	September 7, 1973
Watrousville United Methodist Church Informational Designation		4446 West Caro Road (M-81)	Watrousville	June 10, 1987
R. S. Weaver House		1948 Ringle	Watrousville	July 26, 1974
Wightman Building		113-115 Main	Vassar	January 23, 1997
Daniel G. Wilder House		4409 Caro Road (M-81)	Watrousville	July 26, 1974

== See also ==
- National Register of Historic Places listings in Tuscola County, Michigan

== Sources ==
- Historic Sites Online – Tuscola County. Michigan State Housing Developmental Authority. Accessed June 4, 2011.
