= National Register of Historic Places listings in Tuscola County, Michigan =

The following is a list of Registered Historic Places in Tuscola County, Michigan.
This National Park Service list is complete through NPS recent listings posted September 26, 2025.

	Name on the Register	Image	Date listed	Location	City or town	Description
1	R.C. Burtis House	R.C. Burtis House	June 26, 1975 (#75000962)	2163 S. Ringle Rd. 43°26′52″N 83°31′20″W	Vassar	
2	First Presbyterian Church	First Presbyterian Church	November 15, 2006 (#06001029)	6505 Church St. 43°36′08″N 83°10′28″W	Cass City	
3	Lovira Hart, Jr., and Esther Maria Parker Farm	Lovira Hart, Jr., and Esther Maria Parker Farm	June 16, 2004 (#04000599)	9491 Frankenmuth Rd. 43°20′07″N 83°40′34″W	Tuscola	
4	Hotel Columbia	Hotel Columbia	January 22, 1992 (#91001998)	194 E. Huron Ave. 43°22′16″N 83°34′55″W	Vassar	
5	Hotel Montague	Hotel Montague	July 9, 1991 (#91000875)	200 S. State St. 43°29′19″N 83°23′51″W	Caro	
6	McKinley School	McKinley School	March 24, 1972 (#72000655)	510 Butler St. 43°22′05″N 83°34′35″W	Vassar	
7	Millington Bank Building	Millington Bank Building	November 29, 1995 (#95001387)	8534 State Rd. 43°16′49″N 83°31′49″W	Millington	
8	William J. and Lovila (Wooley) Moore House	William J. and Lovila (Wooley) Moore House	March 27, 2024 (#100010162)	123 North Almer St. 43°29′26″N 83°23′51″W	Caro	
9	Townsend North House	Townsend North House	April 13, 1977 (#77000723)	325 N. Main St. 43°22′31″N 83°34′33″W	Vassar	
10	Randall House	Randall House	November 7, 1976 (#76001035)	5927 Treasurer Rd. 43°20′22″N 83°19′20″W	Mayville	Octagon house, built 1870
11	Smith House	Smith House	March 16, 1972 (#72000656)	113-115 Prospect St. 43°22′19″N 83°35′09″W	Vassar	
12	Trinity Episcopal Church	Trinity Episcopal Church	May 12, 1975 (#75000961)	106 Joy St. 43°29′16″N 83°23′48″W	Caro	
13	Tuscola County Courthouse	Tuscola County Courthouse	December 6, 1996 (#96001419)	440 N. State St. 43°29′27″N 83°23′35″W	Caro	
14	Watrous General Store	Watrous General Store	October 1, 1974 (#74000998)	4607 W. Caro Rd. 43°27′06″N 83°31′28″W	Watrousville	

== See also ==
- List of Michigan State Historic Sites in Tuscola County, Michigan
- List of National Historic Landmarks in Michigan
- National Register of Historic Places listings in Michigan
- Listings in neighboring counties: Bay, Genesee, Huron, Lapeer, Saginaw, Sanilac
