= Vassar Public Schools =

School district in Michigan

Address
- 220 Athletic Street Vassar, Tuscola County, Michigan, 48768; United States

District information
- Motto: Learn, achieve, and succeed to inspire future excellence
- Grades: PreKindergarten–12
- Superintendent: Steve Clark
- Schools: 2
- Budget: $19,472,000 2022-2023 expenditures
- NCES District ID: 2634710

Students and staff
- Students: 809 (2024-2025)
- Teachers: 50.8 (on an FTE basis) (2024-2025)
- Staff: 118.6 FTE (2024-2025)
- Student–teacher ratio: 15.93 (2024-2025)

Other information
- Website: www.vassar.k12.mi.us

Vassar Public Schools is a public school district in Tuscola County, in The Thumb of Michigan. It serves Vassar and parts of the townships of Arbela, Denmark, Juniata, Tuscola, and Vassar.

== History ==
The first school in Vassar was built in 1851. A new brick school was built in 1860, and the first class graduated from there in 1871. In 1886, the McKinley School was built, and the 1860 school continued to be used as the high school until it burned in 1917. It was quickly rebuilt, and was later known as Central Elementary.

The current Vassar Middle/High School opened in fall 1961. The current Central Elementary opened in fall 1995.

== Schools ==
Schools in the district share a campus at 220 Athletic Street in Vassar.

Schools in Vassar Public Schools district
School	Notes
Vassar Middle/High School	Grades 6–12; built 1961
Central Elementary	Grades K-5; built 1995
