= McKinley School =

McKinley School or McKinley Elementary School may refer to several primary-level schools in the United States:

- McKinley Elementary School (Davenport, Iowa), NRHP-listed
- McKinley Elementary School (Fargo, North Dakota)
- McKinley Elementary School (Minot, North Dakota)
- McKinley Elementary School (Muscatine, Iowa)
- McKinley Elementary School (Ottawa, Illinois)
- McKinley Elementary School (Elyria, Ohio)
- McKinley Elementary School (Poland, OH)
- McKinley Elementary School (Redlands, California)
- McKinley Elementary School (Wyandotte, Michigan), listed on the NRHP in Wayne County, Michigan
- McKinley Park School, Reno, Nevada, listed on the NRHP in Washoe County, Nevada
- McKinley Primary Center (South Bend, IN)
- McKinley School (Cincinnati, Ohio), NRHP-listed
- McKinley School (Columbus, Indiana), listed on the National Register of Historic Places (NRHP)
- McKinley School (Parkersburg, WV)
- McKinley School (Pasadena, CA) McKinley Elementary, K-8, Jr. High (1960's), Trade School (70's)
- McKinley School (Vassar, Michigan), listed on the NRHP in Tuscola County, Michigan
- McKinley School (West Milton, Ohio), listed on the NRHP in Miami County, Ohio

== See also ==
- McKinley High School (disambiguation)
