= Senator North =

Senator North may refer to:

- Lois North (1921–2025), Washington State Senate
- Townsend North (1814–1889), Michigan State Senate
- Walter H. North (1933–2014), Michigan State Senate
- William Campbell North (1859–1924), Wisconsin State Senate
- William North (1755–1836), U.S. Senator from New York in 1798
