= Millington Community Schools =

School district in Michigan, United States

Address
- 8664 Dean Drive Milllington, Tuscola County, Michigan, 48746; United States

District information
- Grades: PreKindergarten-12
- Superintendent: Steve Bouvy
- Schools: 5
- Budget: $14,623,000 2022-2023 expenditures
- NCES District ID: 2623910

Students and staff
- Students: 1,102 (2024-2025)
- Teachers: 62.72 (on an FTE basis) (2024-2025)
- Staff: 139.18 FTE (2024-2025)
- Student–teacher ratio: 17.57 (2024-2025)

Other information
- Website: www.mcsdistrict.net

Millington Community Schools is a public school district in the Thumb region of Michigan. In Tuscola County, it serves Millington, Millington Township, and parts of the townships of Arbela, Tuscola, Vassar, and Watertown. In Genesee County, it serves parts of the townships of Forest and Thetford.

== History ==
Millington's first high school class graduated in 1889. Behind the older school along Gleason Street, Millington Community School opened in August 1950, and it served as the high school for many years.

An elementary school, designed by H.E. Beyster and Associates, opened in October 1956. Another school, Glaza Elementary, opened the next year. By 1972, the district was overcrowded. After two years of split-sessions, in 1974 the district began a year-long school calendar in order to save space.

The current Millington Junior/Senior High School opened in fall 1979, ending the overcrowding crisis. The former high school became the district's junior high, and in 1986 was renamed Meachum Junior High after a long-serving superintendent.

== Schools ==
Schools in Millington Community Schools district
School	Address	Notes
Millington Junior/Senior High School	8780 Dean Drive, Millington	Grades 6–12.
Meachum Elementary	8537 Gleason Street, Millington	Grades K-5
Malc	8664 Dean Drive, Millington	Alternative school
