= Millington Jr./Sr. High School =

Millington Junior/Senior High School
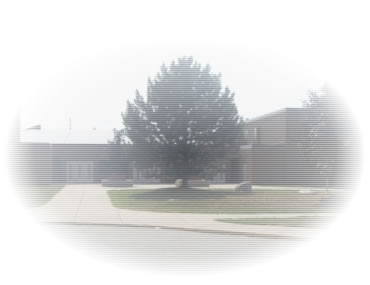
- Entrance of Millington Jr/Sr High School

Location
- 8780 Dean Drive; Millington, Michigan 48746; United States
- Coordinates: 43.274°N 83.519°W

Information
- School type: Public High School; Public Junior High School
- School district: Millington Community Schools
- NCES District ID: 2623910
- NCES School ID: 262391006075
- Principal: Stephen Bouvy
- Grades: 6-12
- Enrollment: 393 (Grades 9-12)
- Colors: Red; White
- Athletics conference: Tri-Valley West Athletic Conference
- Mascot: Cardinals
- Accreditation: North Central Association
- Website: www.mcsdistrict.net/page/millington-junior-senior-high

Millington Jr./Sr. High School is a combined public junior/senior high school located in Millington, Michigan, United States in south western Tuscola County. It is part of the Millington Community Schools system and is a member of the Tri-Valley West Athletic Conference.

== Academics ==
Millington High School is accredited by the North Central Association. Advanced Placement courses are offered in biology, statistics, U.S. history, world history, and English literature. Additional AP courses are available online through Michigan Virtual High School. College credit can be obtained through Cardinal College in association with Mott Community College.

== Athletics ==
Millington is a member of the Tri-Valley West Athletic Conference, which is a member of the Michigan High School Athletic Association.

Millington participates in the following sports:

- American football
- Baseball
- Basketball
- Cheerleading
- Cross country
- Golf
- Powerlifting
- Soccer
- Softball
- Track and field
- Volleyball
- Wrestling

== Notable alumni ==
- Danny Schell, former Major League Baseball player for Philadelphia Phillies
