= McKinley High School =

McKinley High School may refer to:

== United States ==
- President William McKinley High School, Honolulu, Hawaii
- McKinley High School (Chicago), Illinois, closed 1954
- McKinley High School (Sebring, Ohio), Sebring, Ohio
- McKinley High School (Louisiana), Baton Rouge, Louisiana
- McKinley Vocational High School, Buffalo, New York
- McKinley High School (Canton, Ohio), Canton, Ohio
- Niles McKinley High School, Niles, Ohio
- McKinley Classical Leadership Academy, St. Louis, Missouri
- McKinley Technology High School, Washington, D.C.

== Fictional schools ==
- William McKinley High School, in television shows
  - The Wonder Years (1988–1993)
  - Freaks and Geeks (1999–2001)
  - Glee (2009–2015)
- William McKinley High School; in films
  - Accepted (film) (2006)
  - Final Destination 3 (2006)
  - Starstruck (2010)
  - Bad Moms (2016)
- McKinley High School, in the Canadian television series Edgemont (2001–2005)
- McKinley High School, in This Is Us Season 2, Episode 8

== See also ==
- McKinley School (disambiguation)
