= Richard C. Burtis House =

Historic house in Michigan, United States

- R. C. Burtis House
- U.S. National Register of Historic Places
- Michigan State Historic Site
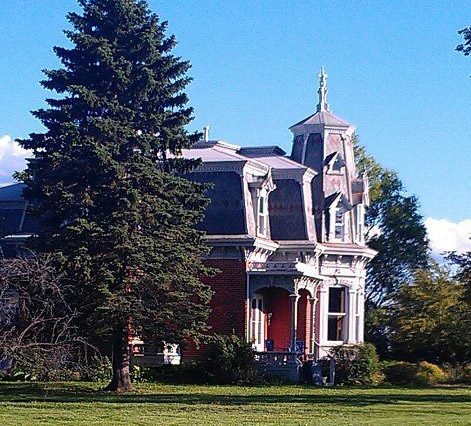
- Burtis Home, 2012

- Location within Michigan Location within the United States
- Interactive map
- Coordinates: 43°26′52″N 83°31′20″W
- Area: 4.4 acres (1.8 ha)
- Built: 1879
- Architectural style: Second Empire
- NRHP reference No.: 75000962

Significant dates
- Added to NRHP: June 26, 1975
- Designated MSHS: November 15, 1973

The Richard C. Burtis House or Wedding Cake House is a Historic Site in Tuscola County, Michigan. The two-story Second Empire building was built from 1879 to 1880 for Richard C. Burtis, a shoemaker and local landowner. Ornamentation includes brackets and a decorative frieze supporting a mansard roof with decorative slate shingle. A bay window topped by a steep octagonal tower dominates the front facade. The Burtis home appeared on Travel Channel in 2019.

== Richard C. Burtis ==
Richard C. Burtis was born in Pittstown, near Troy, New York, in April 1824. While quite young, Burtis moved with his parents to Hoosick Falls, N.Y. When Burtis was only five years old, his father died. Burtis's mother and family soon moved to Troy, New York, where they resided about six years. Then they moved to Ashtabula County, Ohio, returning to Troy, New York in 1838. Burtis accepted a position in a grocery store, where he remained three years, at which point he went to Ithaca, New York and learned the shoemakers’ trade. He remained there three-and-a-half years and worked in nearly all of the Eastern cities for the following fifteen years.

In 1855, Burtis went to Michigan on a hunting expedition, and two years later relocated to Watrousville, Tuscola County, where he engaged in shoemaking up to 1862. Burtis's brother died in 1862, and Burtis took ownership with his sister, Sara, in a general store. After seven years, Burtis took full ownership of the entire stock and conducted the store alone about thirteen years until he retired in 1882.

Burtis also became the postmaster of Watrousville for four years, from 1862 to 1866, when the Postmaster General was given orders to relieve postmasters across the country and replace them with veterans returning from the Civil War. One-hundred-seventy were replaced in Michigan. Burtis married Miss Flora A. Chubb, of Nankin, Wayne County, Michigan, in 1868.

== House History ==
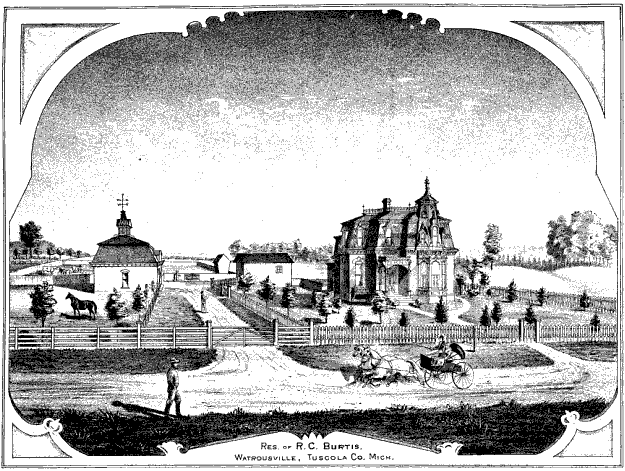
Illustration from History of Tuscola and Bay Counties (1883)

Burtis purchased 40 acres of land at this site in about 1870, and constructed a house on the site, on one of the highest point in Tuscola County. This original house was torn down in 1879 when work on the present house started. Construction was finished in 1880. Burtis and his wife remained in their home until his death on January 17, 1901, at the age of 77. The house was then sold to Byron Cole in 1901.

The house was designated a Michigan State Historic Site on November 15, 1973. It was listed on the National Register of Historic Places on June 26, 1975.

The Burtis home appeared on the series premiere episode of Travel Channel new show Ghost Brothers: Haunted Houseguest. Aired on August 16, 2019

== Description ==
The Burtis House is an excellent example of Second Empire architecture. It is a two-story solid brick structure sitting on a stone-and-concrete foundation. It measures 65 feet by 40 feet, and has a slate mansard roof supported with Italianate-style brackets and a multi-sided, turret-type gable. The sash windows have hood moldings of various types. A wooden front porch is supported by delicate columns with features intricate crest-like carvings. An iron railing that once topped the second story has been removed.

On the interior, the Burtis House has rich ornamentation, with large and high-ceilinged rooms. The front parlor has intricate, multi-colored scrollwork on the ceiling edge, and has a large fireplace of emerald marble. The dining room floor has alternate bands of light and dark woods. A winding staircase leads to the second story, which contains bedrooms and servants' quarters.

== See also ==
- National Register of Historic Places listings in Tuscola County, Michigan
- List of Michigan State Historic Sites in Tuscola County, Michigan
