= Idah McGlone Gibson =

American journalist (1860–1933)

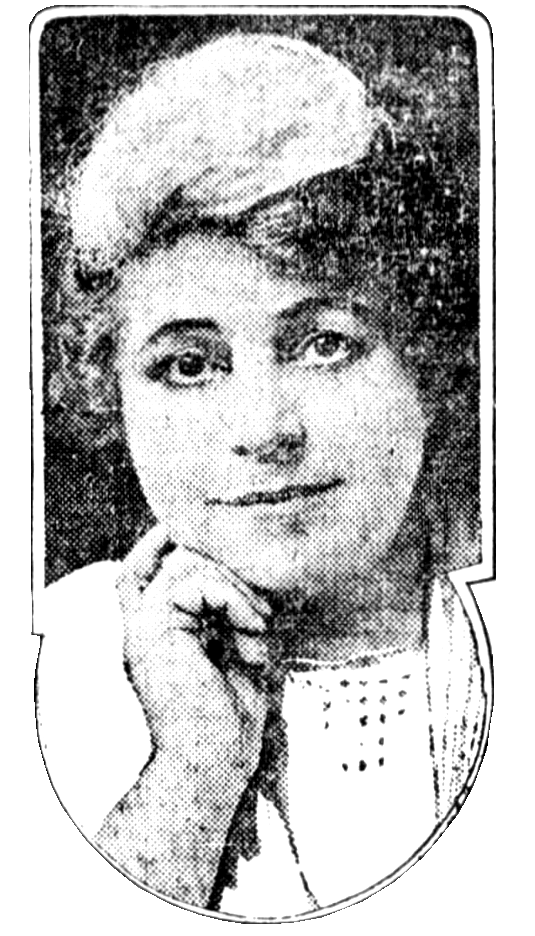
- Born: July 4, 1860; Watrousville, Michigan
- Died: December 16, 1933 (aged 73)
- Occupations: Journalist, poet, publicist, lecturer

Idah McGlone Gibson (July 4, 1860 – December 16, 1933) was an American journalist, author, poet, publicist, theater critic, public speaker. In her day, she was widely known: a prolific writer whose columns were syndicated in hundreds of newspapers, including such major publications as the New York Herald, New York World, The Philadelphia Press, Chicago Tribune, and the Los Angeles Evening Express. During a thirty-year journalism career, she wrote about famous people from all walks of life, and was considered an expert at "interviewing celebrities and bringing out the salient facts of their careers."

== Early life ==
Ida McGlone was born in Watrousville, Michigan, a newly established township in Tuscola County. Her paternal grandfather, Patrick McGlone Jr. and her maternal grandfather, Aaron Watrous, were two of its founders. Ida was the daughter of Joseph Reed McGlone, a lumberman, and his wife Sophronia (Watrous). Little is known about her childhood, and while some sources would claim that she married at 16 Michigan's state marriage records show that she married Henry H. Gibson in Flint, Michigan in 1878, when she was 18. She listed her occupation as "journalist." Her husband was also listed as a journalist; he subsequently became a lumberman—it was Ida's father who hired Henry and taught him the trade.

By the early 1880s, city directories show that the McGlone family had relocated to Toledo, Ohio, as did Henry and Ida. Little information exists about where she worked during that period, but by the mid-1890s, she had been hired as a correspondent for the Toledo Blade, where she was promoted to the newspaper's drama and theatrical editor, a position she held for seven years. By the late 1890s, she was spelling her first name Idah.

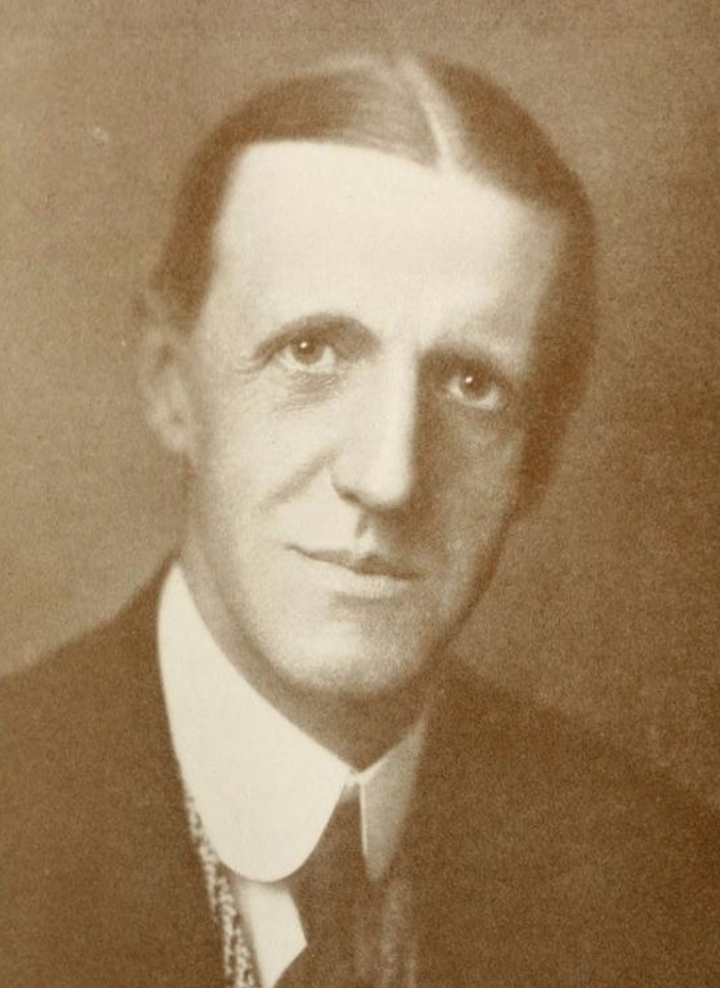
Henry H. Gibson, husband of Idah McGlone Gibson

== Journalism career in Toledo ==
Gibson became known for her theater reviews and critiques of local drama, often written under her pen name, "Mac." Her contemporaries observed that unlike some critics who were regarded with distrust, she had earned "the confidence and friendship" of most people in the theater profession. In addition to offering her insights about the theater, she also began doing a series of lectures in venues all over Ohio and neighboring states, bringing her collection of autographed photos, and telling interesting stories about all the actors and actresses she had met. When not writing for the Toledo Blade or giving educational talks, she worked as a publicist for local theater owner and impresario Frank Burt, promoting some of his acts. She also became a charter member of the Ohio Newspaper Women's Association, when it was founded in Toledo in October 1902.

A reporter asked her the secret of her success, and McGlone Gibson attributed it to her work ethic. "To succeed in anything, you must love it and be willing to give up all other things for it and work, work, work." She also disagreed with the belief that a woman's place is in the home, saying that not all women are cut out to be homemakers. And she added, "The professional or business woman can be just as modest and refined and sweet as the woman who stays at home, whatever her work may be. It all depends on how she does it." But although she said that her first priority was her career, she and her husband were happily married: according to colleagues of Henry Gibson, the two had busy careers, but they were very devoted to each other.

== Celebrity interviewer and serial novelist ==
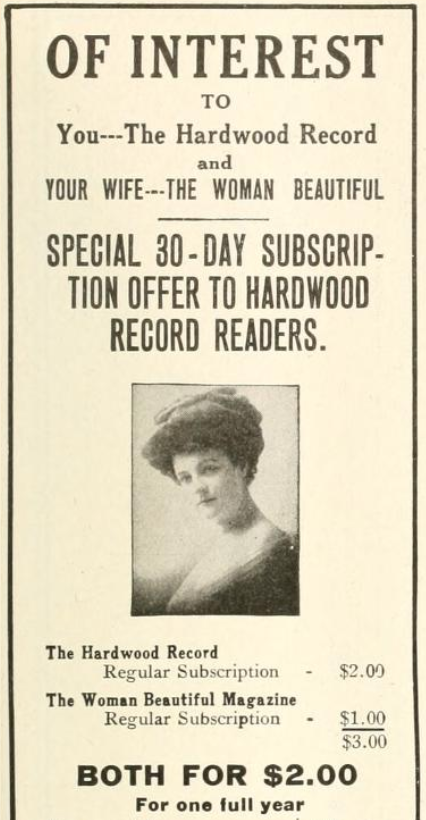
Advert for McGlone Gibson's The Woman Beautiful magazine in her husband's The Hardwood Record, April 1910

When Henry Gibson's career in the lumber trade took him to Chicago circa 1904, Idah relocated too. Henry became the founder and publisher of a new journal, The Hardwood Record; Idah contributed nature writing, both poetry and short stories. She also started a beauty magazine, The Woman Beautiful, advertised as a publication "written by women, for women." Its focus was on "the cultivation and preservation of womanly beauty;" she edited and published it from 1908-1911. Idah was subsequently hired by the Chicago Tribune, where she wrote on the Women's page. In addition to reviews of stage presentations, she wrote profiles of the stars. For example, she profiled actress Lillian Russell, whom she had known for many years. When Russell began contributing a beauty column to the Tribune's Women's page, it was Idah who helped her to write it. Among other famous people she interviewed or profiled were actress Mary Pickford, and Cora Harvey, a "woman hobo." She shared the beauty tips of famous actresses like Jane Cowl. And she covered human interest stories like the honeymoon of President Woodrow Wilson and his new bride Edith.

In addition to writing about stars of the stage, Idah published a series of syndicated interviews with baseball players, around the time of the 1912 World Series. She spoke with New York Giants manager John McGraw, Boston Red Sox manager Jake Stahl, Boston Red Sox pitcher Smoky Joe Wood, New York Giants pitcher Christy Mathewson, and several others. Then, later in October 1912, she published a series of syndicated articles about the wives of presidents and presidential candidates; they included Edith Roosevelt, wife of Theodore Roosevelt, and Nellie Taft, wife of William Howard Taft. In 1916, Idah published another series of interviews with baseball players and managers, including Wilbert Robinson and Zach Wheat.

In November 1913, a new serialized romantic novel, "Confessions of a Wife," debuted on the women's page of many newspapers. The pseudonymous author, "Margaret Hastings," was subsequently revealed to be Idah McGlone Gibson. The serial was so popular that it appeared in daily newspapers for nearly seven years, and ran to a total of 600,000 words. When "Confessions of a Wife" ended, she followed up with a war-themed serial, "Confessions of a War Wife."

== Personal life and later years ==
In late March 1914, Idah's husband Henry died unexpectedly; no children were mentioned in his obituary, nor in census documents. But after Idah's sister Carrie, widow of Edward Koch, died in 1915, Idah took in the Kochs' sixteen year old son Kenneth. He was subsequently referred to as Idah's son in newspaper articles, and he took the Gibson last name.

In November 1917, it was announced by the newspaper syndicate for which she wrote that she would be going overseas on behalf of the American Red Cross, to write about the war effort and publicize the work of the Red Cross. While reporting from France, she was able to get an interview with General John J. Pershing. Among the topics they discussed was how the Red Cross was helping in the war effort.

She continued to write syndicated columns and newspaper serials throughout the 1920s, relocating after her return from Europe to live in Hollywood, where Kenneth Gibson pursued an acting career. When women attained the vote, she became involved with politics, joining the Democratic party, and becoming a publicist for Illinois' chapter of the Woman's Democratic National Committee; she also spoke in support of Woodrow Wilson's efforts to achieve peace. Idah McGlone Gibson died on December 16, 1933, at age 73, after a long illness. Some sources have claimed, erroneously, that she originated the "newspaper serial story." (Note: While it is true that her serialized fiction, especially the 1913-1918 "Confessions of a Wife," helped to popularize the genre for a new generation of American newspaper readers, there had been other serialized stories in newspapers in the 1800s, notably, in the US, Uncle Tom's Cabin, which appeared in an abolitionist newspaper, The National Era, beginning in June 1851.) Just before her death, she sent letters to some of her friends. She said she was not afraid to die, and she asked her friends not to mourn because "I have loved and lived life to the fullest."
