= Townsend North House =

- U.S. National Register of Historic Places
- Michigan State Historic Site
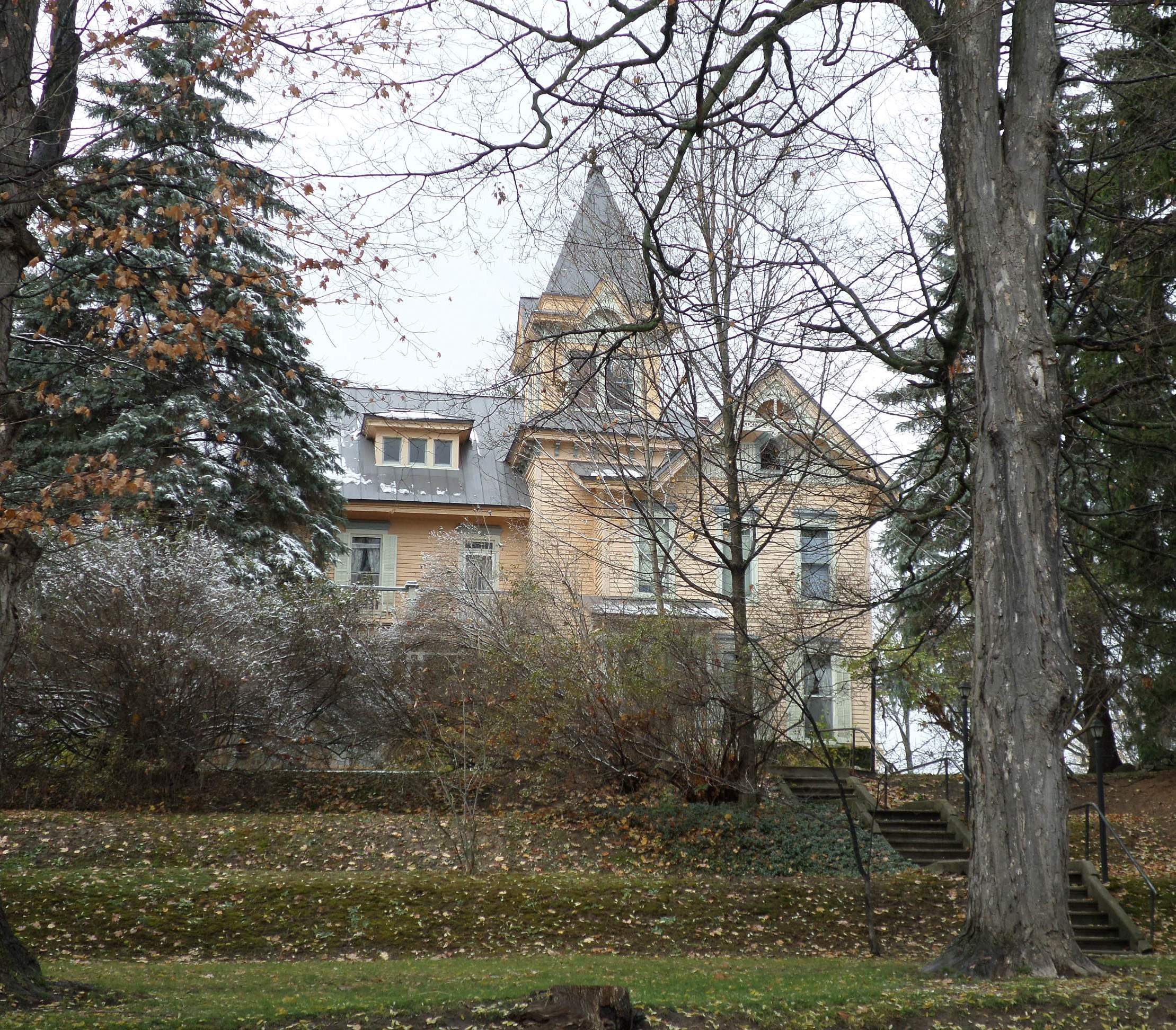

- Location within Michigan Location within the United States
- Interactive map
- Location: 325 N. Main, Vassar, Michigan
- Coordinates: 43°22′31″N 83°34′33″W
- Area: less than one acre
- Built: 1865
- Architectural style: Queen Anne, Eastlake
- NRHP reference No.: 77000723
- Added to NRHP: April 13, 1977

The Townsend North House is a private house located at 325 North Main Street in Vassar, Michigan. It was listed on the National Register of Historic Places in 1977.

== History ==
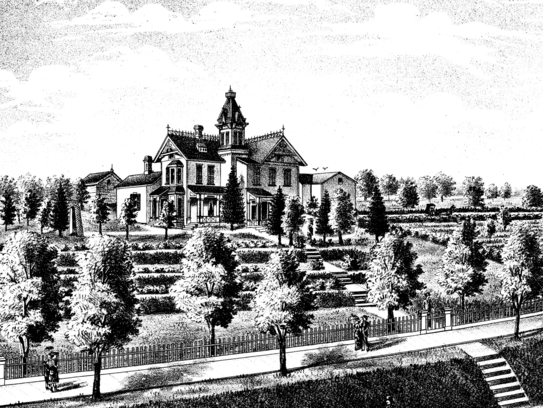
Townsend North House c. 1883

Townsend North was born in 1814 in Ulster County, New York. In 1835, his family moved to Washtenaw County, Michigan, where North and his father established a construction contracting company which, among other things, built the first dormitory on the University of Michigan's campus. North's father retired in 1839, but Townsend North continued in the contracting business until 1845, when he moved to Flint. There, he became part of a venture to construct a bridge across the Cass River at Bridgeport; his payment for his contribution was 3000 acres of land, to be located in any portion of Michigan. North chose this location in Tuscola County, and established the town of Vassar.

North lived in Vassar and contributed to the economy of the town. He established the first sawmill in 1849, selling it in 1865. He founded a woolen mill in 1867, and by 1875 opened the first bank in Vassar and the first successful general store. He also held public office, ranging from serving as the Tuscola County Register of Deeds in 1850 to serving as State Senator from 1874 to 1875.

In 1865, North constructed a house at this location, on a high bluff overlooking Vassar. In 1880, he refurbished and expanded the house into this stylish mansion. The house had the first central heating system in the town, as well as its own hot and cold water system. Townsend North died in 1889. The house is currently owned and occupied by Roger and Pat Goggans.

== Description ==
The Townsend North House is a 2-1/2-story L-shaped Eastlake structure with asymmetrical massing, clad in clapboard. The facade dominated by a narrow, ornate center tower, located in the center of the L, with a steeply sloped hip roof. To the left of the tower is a two-story, two-bay section capped by a gable roof with the eavesline to the front. To the right of the tower is another two-story, two-bay section capped by a gable roof, but with the gable end to the front. Gables are clad with vertical boards. Shutters cover the four bay windows. Two front porches haves paired support columns and heavy cornices.

On the interior, the house has hardwood woodwork of cherry, walnut, and oak. Etched glass is used throughout for decoration, with a particularly fine example on the front door. Doorframes are elaborately carved, with fine Eastlake detail. In the master bedroom, the fireplace surround displays the ornate carving, and an ornately crafted mirror surround is located above the fireplace.
