= Millington Bank Building =

- U.S. National Register of Historic Places
- Michigan State Historic Site
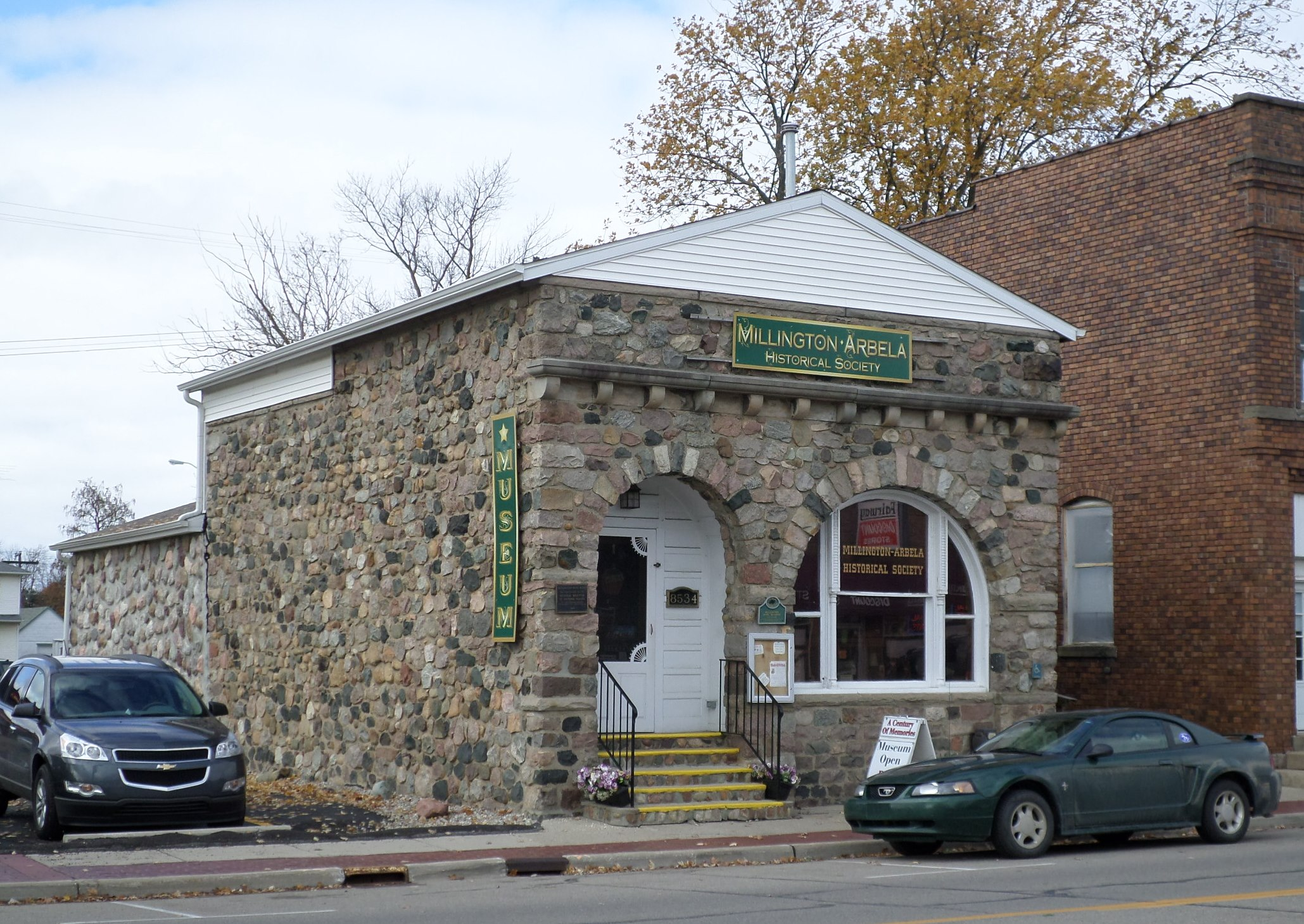

- Location within Michigan Location within the United States
- Interactive map
- Location: 8534 State St., Millington, Michigan
- Coordinates: 43°16′49″N 83°31′49″W
- Area: less than one acre
- Built: c. 1897
- Architectural style: Romanesque
- NRHP reference No.: 95001387
- Added to NRHP: November 29, 1995

The Millington Bank Building is a commercial building located at 8534 State Street in Millington, Michigan. It was listed on the National Register of Historic Places in 1995. It now houses the house the Millington-Arbela Historical Society's museum.

== History ==
Millington Township was first settled in 1850. Logging began a few years later, and the railroad line came through in 1871. This led to the platting in 1873 of the village of Millington. The village was incorporated in 1877, and by 1881 had a population of about 450 people. The first local bank in Millington was established in the early 1890s by local druggist John A. Damon, who founded the Millington Bank. By 1893 Damon had sold out to F.E. Kelsey and Co. owned by Frederick E. Kelsey and Julian D. Wilsey. In 1897, Kelsey and Wilsey purchased the site on which this building sits; the bank building was almost certainly constructed later that year or in early 1898.

At the end of 1898, Kelsey and Wilsey sold the bank property to Caro bankers William H. Carson and John M. Ealy. The firm took on more partners, and Carson died in 1904; by 1907 the firm running the Millington Bank was called Ealy, Evans & Co. Ealy, however, overextended by purchasing or establishing a string of banks in the region, and in 1927 declared bankruptcy.

A new bank, the Millington National Bank, was formed in 1927 and purchased the former Bank of Millington building in 1929. However, the Millington National Bank failed in 1933. The building housed a medical practice from 1938 to 1948, served as the public library from 1952 to 1972, and housed a photo studio and card shop from 1972 to 1995. After this, the building was refurbished to house the Millington-Arbela Historical Society's museum. The museum continues to operate in the building.

== Description ==
The Millington Bank Building is a single story commercial building constructed with split fieldstone walls and a flat roof. The building measures twenty-four feet in width by thirty feet in depth. The main facade has two similar broad, arched openings. One holds the recessed main entrance, the other opening holds a tripartite window with double-hung sash. A cornice runs across the top. The interior was and is a single room, with a brick vault against the rear wall.
