= Watrous General Store =

- U.S. National Register of Historic Places
- Michigan State Historic Site
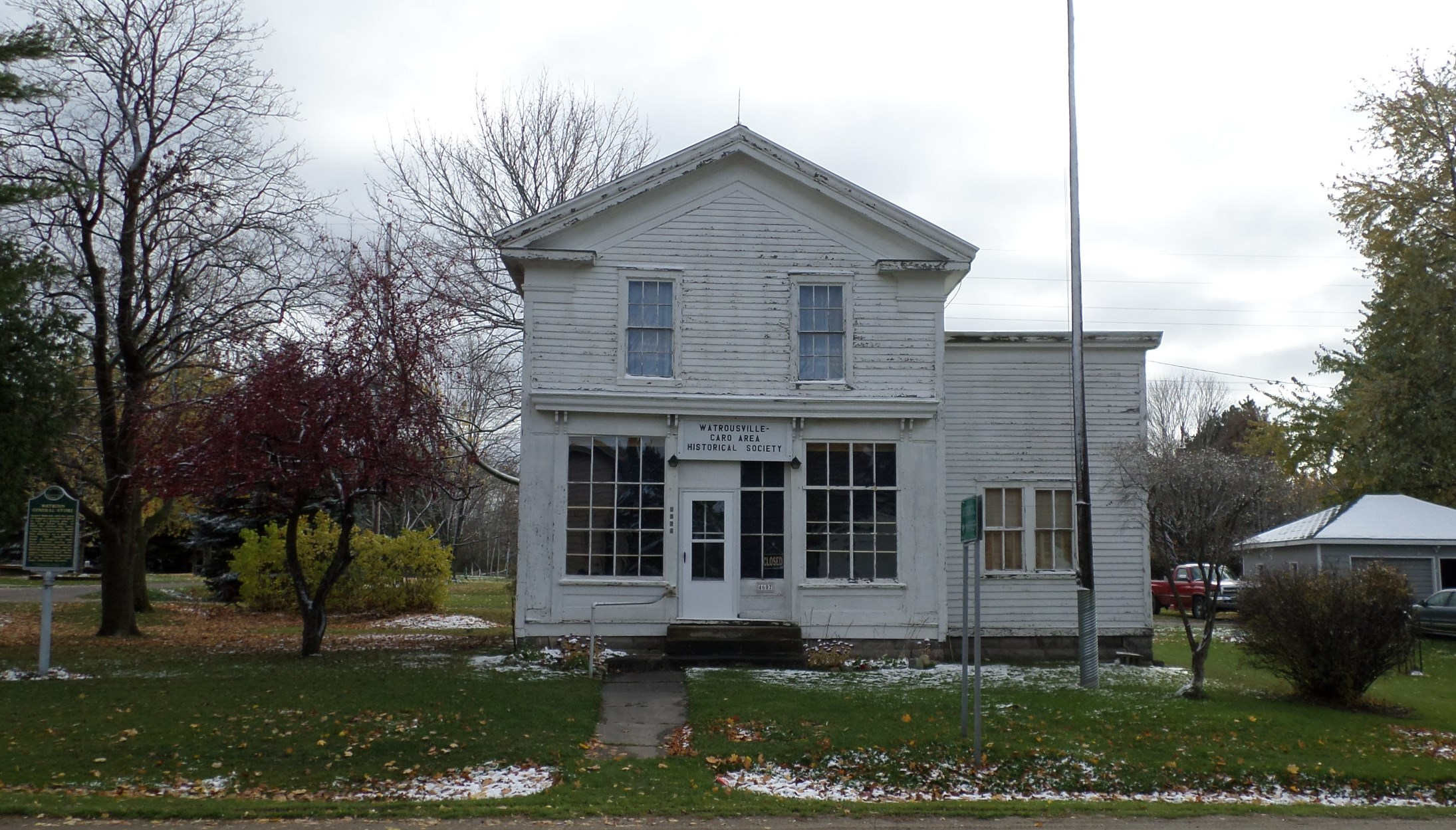

- Location within Michigan Location within the United States
- Interactive map
- Location: 4607 W. Caro Rd., Watrousville, Michigan
- Coordinates: 43°27′6″N 83°31′28″W
- Area: less than one acre
- Built: 1864
- NRHP reference No.: 74000998
- Added to NRHP: October 1, 1974

The Watrous General Store, also known as the Juniata Township Hall, is a former commercial structure located at 4607 W. Caro Road in Watrousville, Michigan. It was listed on the National Register of Historic Places in 1974. It currently houses the Watrousville Museum.

== History ==
Aaron Watrous first moved to the site of what is now Watrousville in 1852, looking to make money in the logging business. In 1853 he built a sawmill near this site, and shortly afterward built a log boarding house and frame lean-to, from which he operated a store. In 1860 Watrous purchased the land at this location, and platted the village of Watrousville. Some time between 1860 and 1864, he built the first story of the Watrous General Store. In 1864, Watrous sold the store and lot to David Philbrick for $300. Soon after, the building was increased in size to the present dimensions. The Philbrick family at first operated a general store out of the building. However, by 1875, they were operating a furniture store. In 1882, the Philbricks sold the building to the township of Juniata for use as a township hall.

In 1972, the Watrousville – Caro Area Historical Society engaged with the township on a 99-year lease of the building. The Society began refurbishing the building and it now houses the Watrousville Museum.

== Description ==
The Watrous General Store is a two-story balloon frame rectangular structure with a gable roof and a cut stone foundations. It has a one-story wing attached on one side. The structure measures forty feet long by thirty feet wide, including the wing. The exterior is plain but for a heavy wood molding under the eaves and above the front door. The unusually tall door is flanked by black metal light fixtures. The windows on the first floor of the main structure are two over four double hung sash units, the upstairs windows are six over six double hung sash units, and the windows in the wing are two over two double hung sash units.
