= Hotel Columbia =

Historic building in Vassar, Michigan, US

- U.S. National Register of Historic Places
- Michigan State Historic Site
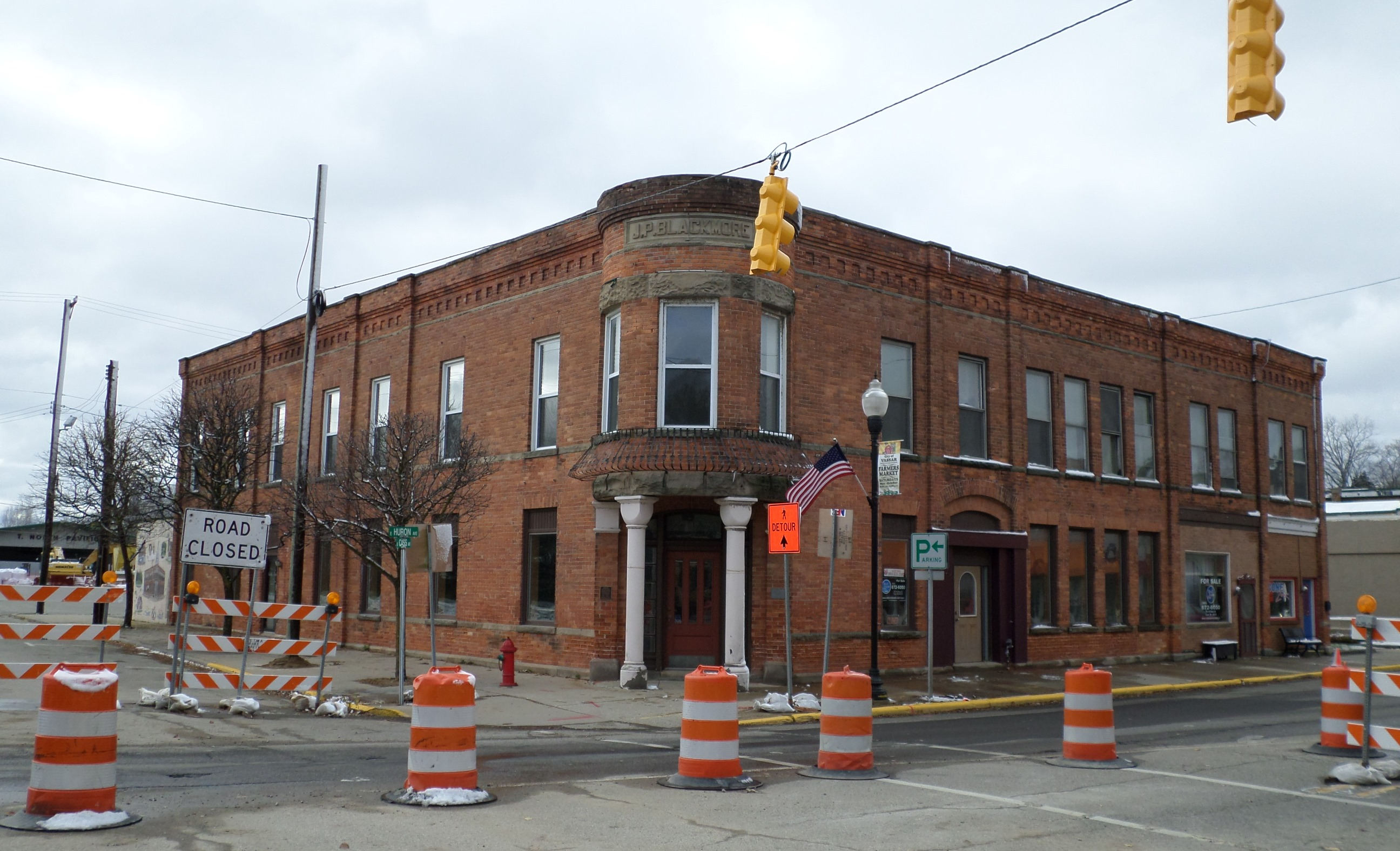

- Location within Michigan Location within the United States
- Interactive map showing the location for Hotel Columbia
- Location: 194 E. Huron Ave., Vassar, Michigan
- Coordinates: 43°22′16″N 83°34′55″W
- Area: less than one acre
- Built: 1892
- Architectural style: Romanesque
- NRHP reference No.: 91001998
- Added to NRHP: January 22, 1992

The Hotel Columbia is a former hotel building located at 194 East Huron Avenue in Vassar, Michigan. It was listed on the National Register of Historic Places in 1992. The building now sits empty.

== History ==
Vassar was founded in 1849 by Townsend North and James Edmunds. It grew steadily, primarily due to the logging business, and was incorporated as a village in 1871. However, the depletion of the timberlands in the area and the 1881 Thumb Fire signalled the end of lumbering in Vassar. The area shifted to agricultural production, particularly of sugar beets. By 1900, sugar beet production was an important component of the local economy.

During this era or transition, prominent Vassar businessman J.P. Blackmore constructed this hotel. Blackmore was born in County Tippery, Ireland, and came to Michigan in 1871 to work on the construction of heavy timber bridges for new railroad lines being built at the time. By 1874, J.P and his brother Simon had moved to Vassar and set out on various business ventures, including opening a saloon and billiards hall in 1875 and later purchasing the Central House, one of Vassar's earliest inns. In 1883, Blackmore purchased the Jewell House in Vassar, then expanded the hotel and sold it in 1888 to concentrate on farming. However, in 1892, Blackmore built this hotel, the Hotel Columbia in Vassar.

Blackmore owned and operated the Hotel Columbia until 1902, when he sold the business to his brother Simon. Simon Blackmore sold the business to John H. Schultz in 1909. The hotel and its restaurant passed through a number of owners between 1913 and 1932 and became the "Vassar Hotel" in 1929.

It operated as a hotel until 1986, when a severe flood damaged the building and forced it to close. Demolition of the building was planned, but the formation of the Cork Pine Preservation Association (now the Vassar Historical Society) prevented demolition. The group renovated the hotel, and a restaurant, "Betty Lou's," opened inside in 1996. Betty Lou's closed in the 2010s. The building was vacant for several years until 2016, when a new restaurant, the Riverside Grill, opened.

== Description ==
The Hotel Columbia is a two-story L-shaped brownish-red brick commercial building with a flat roof and concrete foundation. A single story mass is at the rear of the building, in the angle of the L; two small additions are appended onto this mass. The building is located on a corner lot, with two main facades, but giving primacy to the longer facade along Huron. Both facades have flat arch one-over-one windows with continuous rock-face sandstone sills. On the corner is a small round "turret" on the second floor, supported by two plain stone columns. Atop the turret is a sandstone block bearing the inscription "J. P. Blackmore." Below the turret is an entrance which originally led to the lobby. The entrance door is surrounded by sidelights and a transom. Both facades are partitioned by pilasters into bays.
