= William J. and Lovila (Wooley) Moore House =

- U.S. National Register of Historic Places
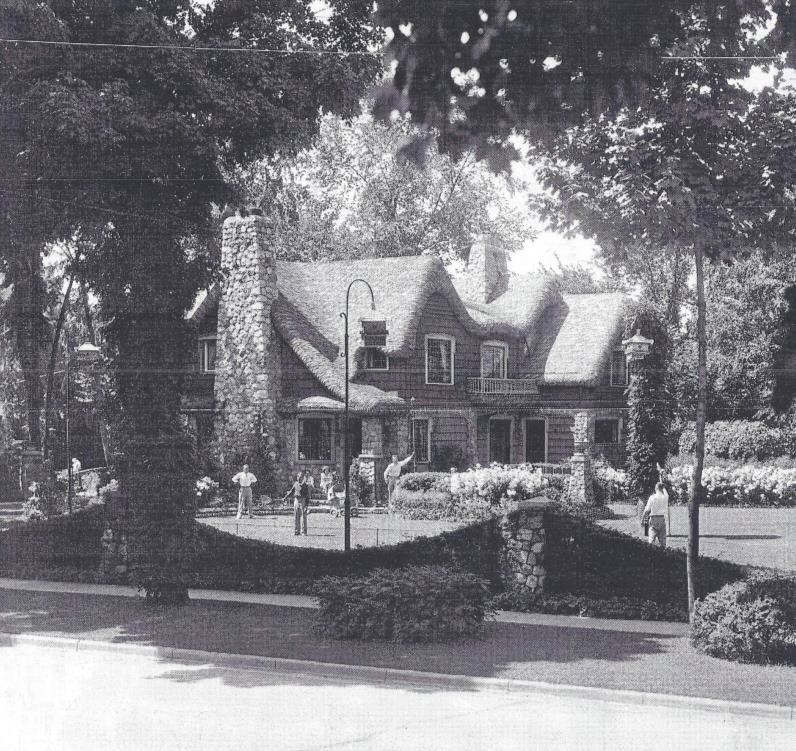
- Moore House in 1926

- Location within Michigan Location within the United States
- Interactive map
- Location: 123 North Almer St. Caro, Michigan
- Coordinates: 43°29′26″N 83°23′51″W
- Built: 1868
- Architect: William J. Moore
- Architectural style: Tudor Revival
- NRHP reference No.: 100010162
- Added to NRHP: March 27, 2024

The William J. and Lovila (Wooley) Moore House is a single family house located at 123 North Almer Street in Caro, Michigan. It was built in 1868, extensively renovated in the 1920s, and added to the National Register in 2024.

== History ==
The house at this location was originally constructed in c. 1868. In 1914, William and Lovila Moore purchased the house. Moore owned a telephone exchange company, originally located in Sandusky, Michigan, but had moved to Caro in 1896. At the time they purchased the house, it was constructed in a Queen Anne style.

In 1923, the Moores began an extensive renovation of their Almer Street house, completely changing the appearance to the current Tudor Revival style. They also added a pool, tennis courts, and other conveniences. Lovila Moore lived in the house until her death in 1937; William J. Moore lived in the house through his retirement in 1947 and until his death in 1955. After this, the couple's son Andrew Moore lived in the house. In 1967, Charles and Dorcus Vaughan bought the property from the Moores. The Vaughn family owned the property until 2017, and descendants of William J. and Lovila Moore lived in the house starting in 2021.

== Description ==
The Moore House is a two-story Tudor Revival house is of frame construction, clad with wood shingles and stone veneer. If has an irregular L-shaped plan. The house has a distinctive, complex false thatched roofline with distinctive dormers on each side.

The house sits on a one-acre lot, which also contains a carriage house renovated in the same style, a swimming pool, a lotus pond, and a pump house. The lot is extensively landscaped with stone and concrete walkways, a rock garden, a concrete fountain, and other features.
