= Smith House (Vassar, Michigan) =

- U.S. National Register of Historic Places
- Michigan State Historic Site
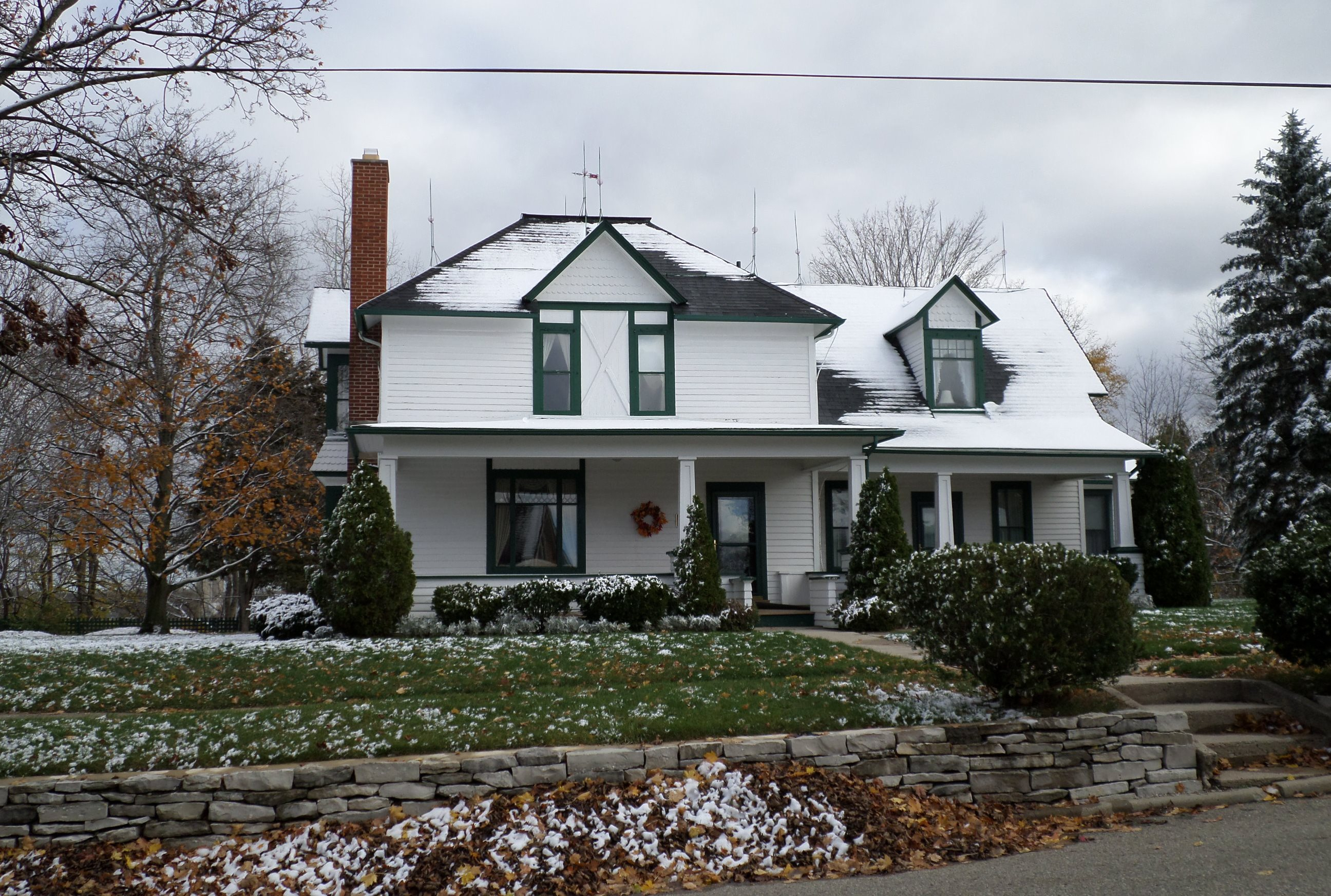

- Location within Michigan Location within the United States
- Interactive map
- Location: 113-115 Prospect St., Vassar, Michigan
- Coordinates: 43°22′19″N 83°35′9″W
- Area: 0 acres (0 ha)
- Built: 1851
- Built by: James Saunders
- NRHP reference No.: 72000656
- Added to NRHP: March 16, 1972

The Smith House is a private house located at 113-115 Prospect Street in Vassar, Michigan. It was listed on the National Register of Historic Places in 1972.

== History ==
Joshua D. Smith was born at Sackets Harbor, New York in 1821. His parents moved to Michigan in 1825. In 1850, Smith moved to a location about 2 mi (3.2 km) south of what is now Vassar. In 1851 he moved to this location and had this house constructed, the first frame house in Vassar. The house was built for Smith by James Saunders, another Vassar pioneer.

Smith remained in this house and engaged in locating land, farming, and manufacturing until his death in 1883. In 1908, the house was purchased by Howard and Clara Smith (no relation to Joshua D.), who turned the house into a two-family home. In 1914, four porches (two in the front and two in the rear) were added to the house, along with a den, cellar, a new kitchen, and two bathrooms. The Smiths passed it on to their son Howard L. Smith. Howard Smith occupied the house as of 1977. It was later passed on to Harry Smith and his wife Shirley.

== Description ==
The Smith House is a 1-1/2 story house with a tower-like structure on one side. It is constructed of fine corkpine, a native of the Vassar area. The house has a gabled roof, with a partial hip roof on the front and a gabled dormer on the wing. The exterior is painted white and trimmed in green, with plainly trimmed windows. The front porches are supported with square columns.

The interior contains a living room, downstairs bedroom, dining room, and kitchen, and bedrooms upstairs, which are all original construction. A den, cellar, a new kitchen, and two bathrooms were added in 1914. The interior is in excellent condition, and contains a beautiful staircase.
