= Randall House (Mayville, Michigan) =

Historic house in Michigan, United States

- U.S. National Register of Historic Places
- Michigan State Historic Site
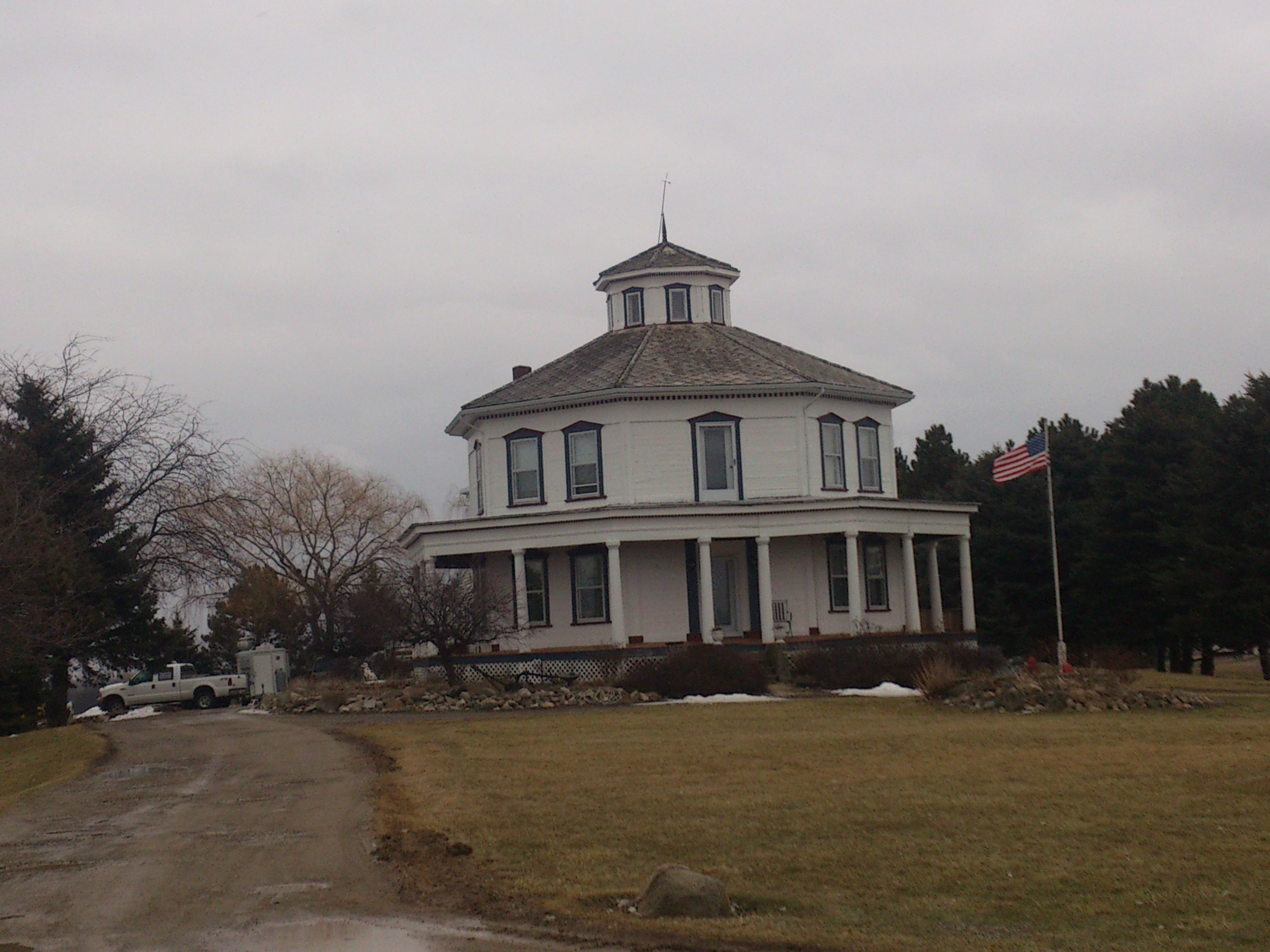
- Randall Octagon House in 2013

- Location within Michigan Location within the United States
- Interactive map showing the location of Randall House
- Location: 5927 Treasurer Rd. Mayville, Michigan
- Coordinates: 43°20′22″N 83°19′20″W
- Built: 1870
- Architect: William Randall
- Architectural style: Octagon Mode
- NRHP reference No.: 76001035
- Added to NRHP: November 7, 1976

The Randall House built in 1870 by William Randall is an historic octagon house located at 5927 Treasurer Road in Mayville, Michigan. On November 7, 1976, it was added to the National Register of Historic Places. It remains a private residence.

== History ==
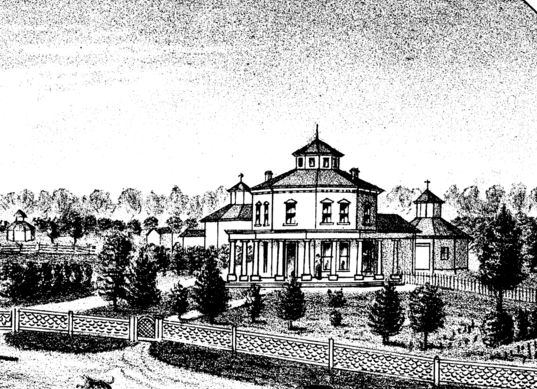
Randall House, c. 1883

William Randall was born in Canada in 1815. In 1850 he married Harriet Primrose, and the couple had four children. Randall was employed as an itinerant carpenter, and worked on projects in Chicago and St. Louis and other places. In 1865, he retired to this location in Michigan, and took up farming. In 1870, he began building this house with help from local carpenters. The Randalls moved in two years later.

William Randall died in 1882, and his land passed to his oldest son, Henry, and his wife Harriet. When Harriet died, her land and the house passed to the Randall's son Grant. He and his wife occupied the house until their deaths, after which the house was vacant.

== Description ==
The Randall House is a two-story balloon frame octagon topped with a cupola, with a one-story rectangular-shaped gable-roof wing on one side. The wing is the original house on the property, incorporated into later construction. The house measures about forty feet long by twenty-eight feet wide. A flat-roof runs around seven sides of the building. Doors are on the north and west sides, and the windows are two by two double-hung sash units. The cupola windows are single Gothic style units.

On the interior, the rooms are small, the largest about twelve by fifteen feet. The main floor contains a kitchen and attached pantry, a library since converted into a bathroom, and two parlors. In the center of the house, a circular stair leads to the second floor, where the bedrooms are located, and to the cupola above.

== See also ==
- List of Registered Historic Places in Tuscola County, Michigan
