= Arbela Township, Michigan =

- Township
- Location within the state of Michigan
- Coordinates: 43°15′40″N 83°38′52″W
- Country: United States
- State: Michigan
- County: Tuscola

Area
  - Total: 33.5 sq mi (86.7 km^{2})
  - Land: 33.4 sq mi (86.6 km^{2})
  - Water: 0.039 sq mi (0.1 km^{2})
- Elevation: 690 ft (210 m)

Population (2020)
  - Total: 2,808
  - Density: 84.0/sq mi (32.4/km^{2})
- Time zone: UTC-5 (Eastern (EST))
  - Summer (DST): UTC-4 (EDT)
- FIPS code: 26-03220
- GNIS feature ID: 1625842
- Website: https://www.arbelatownship.org/

Arbela Township is a civil township of Tuscola County in the U.S. state of Michigan. The population was 2,808 at the 2020 Census.

== Geography ==
According to the United States Census Bureau, the township has a total area of 33.5 square miles (87 km^{2}), of which 33.4 square miles (87 km^{2}) is land and 0.04 square miles (0.10 km^{2}) (0.12%) is water.

Arbela Township is located west of Millington, and is considered part of the Millington Cardinal community.

== Communities ==
- Elva was the name of a rural post office here from 1873 until 1903.

== Demographics ==
At the 2010 Census, Arbela Township had a population of 3,070, as 99.6% of the population lived in households. There were 1,138 households. The racial and ethnic composition of the population was 96.5% white, 0.7% black or African American, 0.5% Native American, 0.2% Asian, 0.6% from some other race and 1.6% reporting two or more races. 1.9% of the population was Hispanic or Latino of any race.

As of the census of 2000, there were 3,219 people, 1,134 households, and 906 families residing in the township. The population density was 96.3 inhabitants per square mile (37.2/km^{2}). There were 1,169 housing units at an average density of 35.0 per square mile (13.5/km^{2}). The racial makeup of the township was 96.99% White, 0.28% African American, 0.65% Native American, 0.12% Asian, 0.16% Pacific Islander, 0.50% from other races, and 1.30% from two or more races. Hispanic or Latino of any race were 1.83% of the population.

There were 1,134 households, out of which 36.9% had children under the age of 18 living with them, 69.3% were married couples living together, 6.7% had a female householder with no husband present, and 20.1% were non-families. 16.8% of all households were made up of individuals, and 5.7% had someone living alone who was 65 years of age or older. The average household size was 2.84 and the average family size was 3.18.

In the township the population was spread out, with 27.2% under the age of 18, 6.9% from 18 to 24, 30.3% from 25 to 44, 25.8% from 45 to 64, and 9.8% who were 65 years of age or older. The median age was 37 years. For every 100 females, there were 103.6 males. For every 100 females age 18 and over, there were 101.5 males.

The median income for a household in the township was $44,840, and the median income for a family was $51,630. Males had a median income of $38,365 versus $21,563 for females. The per capita income for the township was $17,519. About 3.2% of families and 4.6% of the population were below the poverty line, including 3.3% of those under age 18 and 3.3% of those age 65 or over.

== History ==
The Pine Grove Post Office opened on June 2, 1858, on Arbela Road, east of Lewis Road. This office was renamed to Arbela on January 16, 1871, and closed on May 31, 1905.
