= First Presbyterian Church (Cass City, Michigan) =

Historic church in Michigan, United States

- U.S. National Register of Historic Places
- Michigan State Historic Site
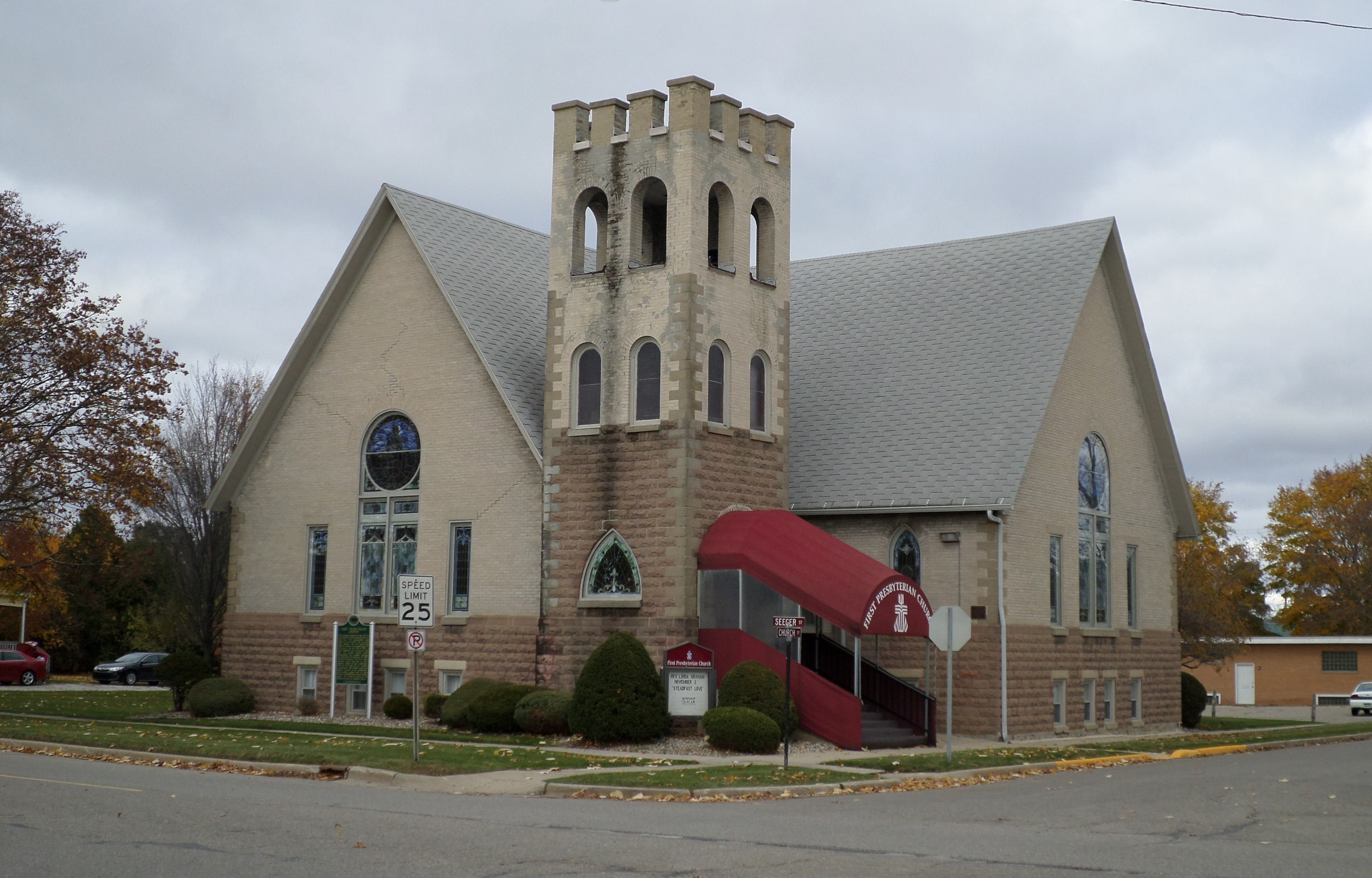
- The church in May, 2016

- Location within Michigan Location within the United States
- Interactive map
- Location: 6505 Church St. Cass City, Michigan
- Coordinates: 43°36′8″N 83°10′28″W
- Area: less than one acre
- Built: 1907
- Built by: I. K. Hall
- Architectural style: Auditorium church
- NRHP reference No.: 06001029

Significant dates
- Added to NRHP: November 15, 2006
- Designated MSHS: 2009

The First Presbyterian Church is a historic church at 6505 Church Street in Cass City, Michigan. It was built in 1907 and added to the National Register in 2006.

== History ==
Cass City's First Presbyterian Church was organized in 1877, and initially held services in a small one-room schoolhouse. However, by March 1878 enough funds had been raised to begin work on a new building, located at this site. The new building, a wooden Gothic Revival structure, was dedicated in October 1878. In 1906, the original building was enlarged and reconstructed to make the church in its present form. The 1878 building was raised slightly and a basement constructed underneath, and the frame and roof structure was retained to serve as the basis for the new church's rear section. A new front section and bell tower were constructed at the same time, and the new church was dedicated in early 1907. Around the same time, the church purchased an 1865 Henry Erben tracker organ, originally built for the First Presbyterian Church of Pontiac.

The church building continues to serve as the home of the First Presbyterian Church. Updates and restoration of the building have occurred in the 2000s.

== Description ==
The First Presbyterian Church is a T-shaped, cross-gable-roof auditorium church with a square-plan tower. Window openings are a combination of round and pointed-arch styles. The basement is largely above ground level, and is faced with brownish rock-face concrete block, while the upper portion is faced with buff-hued brick. The entrance is through the tower, at the head or a flight of stairs.

On the interior, a small narthex is in the tower, and a set of double doors lead to the auditorium. The floor of the auditorium slopes gently. The curved pews are set into three sections separated by aisles, ad facing a raised pulpit in one corner. A broad opening leads to a separate room, known as the annex. A series of stained and art glass windows installed as part of the 1906-07 reconstruction are installed in the windows.
