= Trinity Episcopal Church (Caro, Michigan) =

Historic church in Michigan, United States

- U.S. National Register of Historic Places
- Michigan State Historic Site
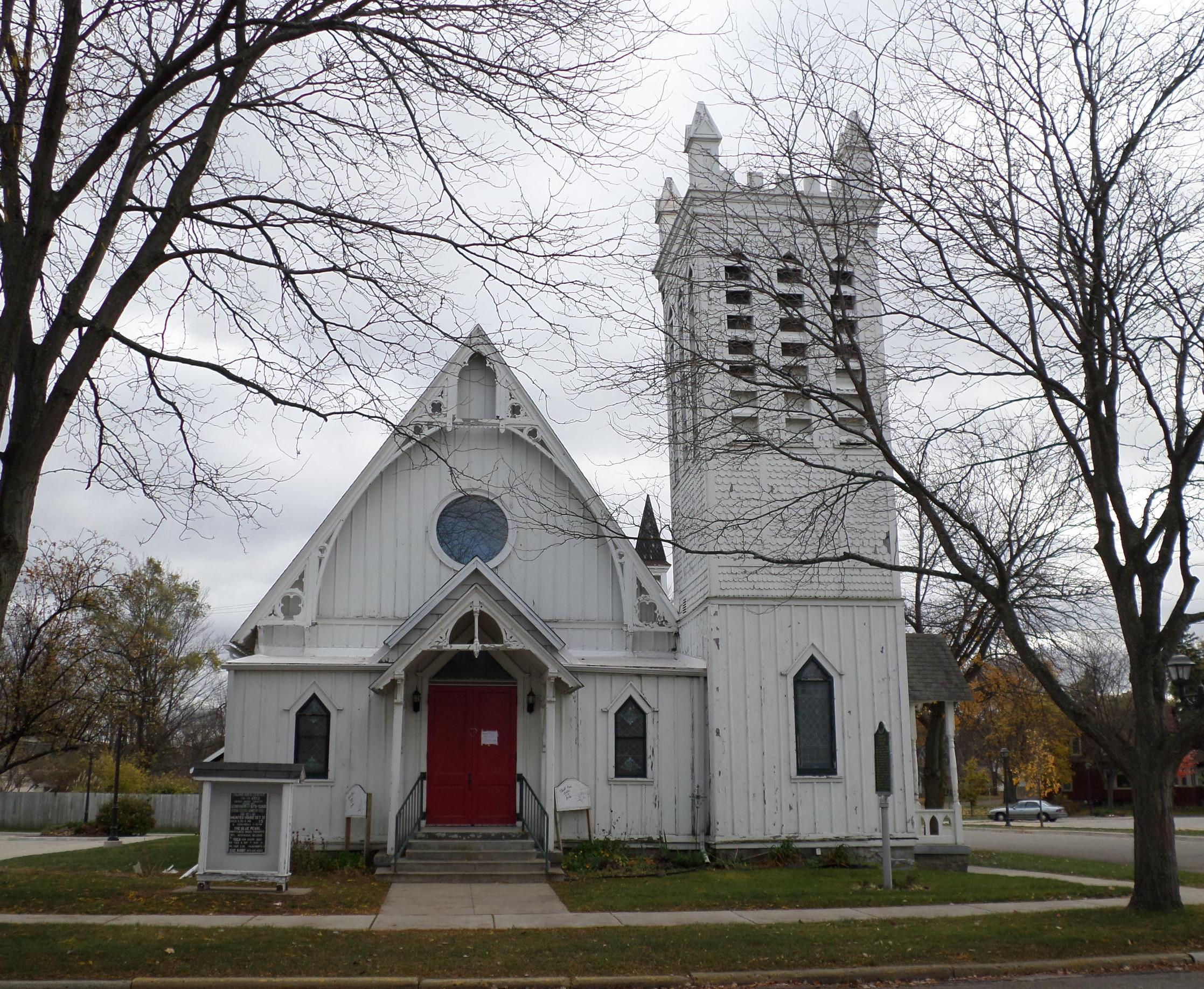
- The church in November, 2014

- Location within Michigan Location within the United States
- Interactive map showing Trinity Episcopal Church
- Location: 106 Joy St., Caro, Michigan
- Coordinates: 43°29′16″N 83°23′48″W
- Area: less than one acre
- Built: 1881
- Architectural style: Gothic Revival
- NRHP reference No.: 75000961

Significant dates
- Added to NRHP: May 12, 1975
- Designated MSHS: December 18, 1974

Trinity Episcopal Church (also known as Trinity Nazarene Church) is a historic church building at 106 Joy Street in Caro, Michigan, in Tuscola County in the Thumb region. The building was added to the National Register of Historic Places in 1975.

== History ==
The Trinity Episcopal Church congregation was organized in 1871. The congregation held services intermittently, and it was not until 1877 that they were organized and had regular services and a pastor. The congregation began planning to build this church in 1880. Construction began in 1881, and the church was completed before Christmas. The church thrived for many years, but in the 1920s the Episcopal congregation dwindled, and the church disbanded in 1929. The building was sold in 1934 to the Church of the Nazarene, which had been founded in 1916. This congregation occupied the church until 1974, when they constructed a new church.

The village of Caro planned to demolish the church. However, preservationists saved the church from demolition. The building was later acquired by the City of Caro and as of 2017 was used by the Thumb Area Center for the Arts. The building was in need of repair, and its future is uncertain.

== Description ==
Trinity Episcopal Church is a Gothic Revival frame church on a stone foundation and clad with board and batten siding. The two wings of the L-shaped building hold a sanctuary and a parish hall. A large square castellated tower is located at one corner and a smaller tower with a pointed roof is atop the parish hall. The building front has an elaborate bargeboard, and a distinctive large round window. The remaining exterior windows are slender and pointed, with leaded glass inserts.

On the interior is a vestibule with pointed windows, after which is the sanctuary. The sanctuary contains pews, doors, wainscoting, and window frames of dark wood. Wooden hammerbeam trusses support the gable roof above.
