= Townsend North =

American politician

Townsend Nathan North (September 24, 1814 — June 12, 1889) was one of the original pioneers of Tuscola County, Michigan.

North was born and grew up in Ulster County, New York, a son of Daniel North and Elizabeth Townsend. He moved to Washtenaw County, Michigan with his father in 1835, where he became a carpenter. Among other commissions, he worked on the first dormitory for the University of Michigan's new campus in Ann Arbor. In 1845, he moved with his wife and three young children to Flint, where he ran both a lumber yard and a hotel. In 1849 he founded the city of Vassar, on land he had received as part of a deal to build a bridge over the Cass River.

Through the thriving lumber industry of Michigan's forests, Townsend North quickly became wealthy and expanded his businesses to include lumber mills, hotels, rail and banking. Eventually North became involved in politics and held office until his death in 1889. He served in the Michigan State Senate in 1874 and 1875.

== Family ==
At the age of 24, on 13 December 1838 in Washtenaw County, Townsend North married Mary Ann Edmunds (22 July 1816 Royalton Center, Niagara County, New York, United States of America – 23 December 1863 Vassar, Tuscola County, Michigan). They had nine children but only the two eldest, James Edmunds North (20 November 1839 – 20 May 1874) and Mary Esther Gould North (1842–1909) had progeny. Their third and fourth children, Elizabeth Ann North (1844–1879) and William Townsend North (1847–1871) remained unmarried without issue. Their sixth child Frank North (1858–1943) married without progeny and their other children died in infancy.

About a year and one month after the death of his first wife, 50-year-old Townsend North married Lydia Celia "Celia L." Gibson (1840–1927) on 26 January 1865 in Tuscola County. Their older daughters Alma Lucile North (1867–1952) and Ula North (1871–1964) remained unmarried, while their youngest daughter Lena Townsend North (1882–1970) married and had a surviving son Erwin North Bodimer (1908–1998) who remained unmarried.
