= McKinley School (Vassar, Michigan) =

- U.S. National Register of Historic Places
- Michigan State Historic Site
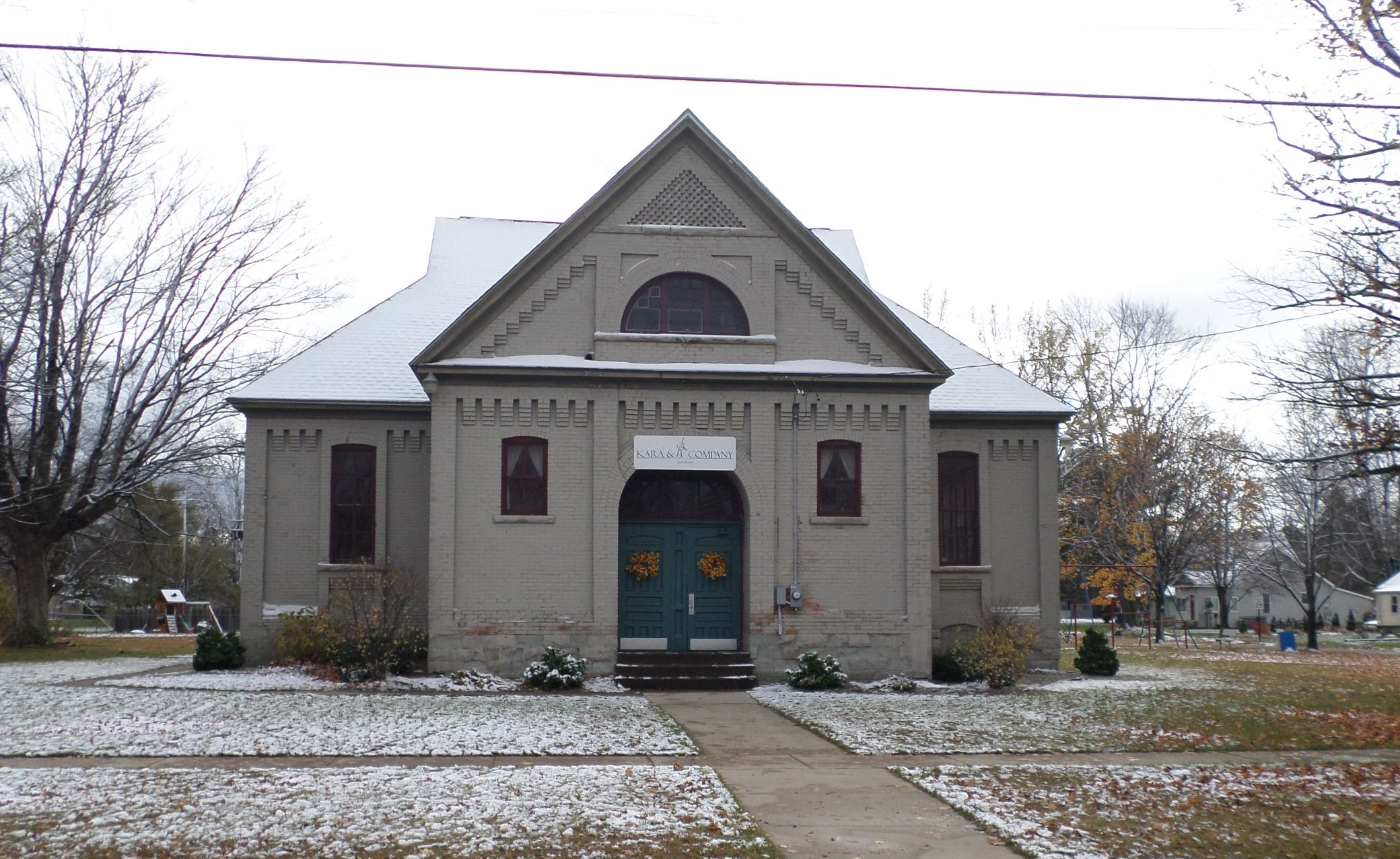

- Location within Michigan Location within the United States
- Interactive map
- Location: 510 Butler St., Vassar, Michigan
- Coordinates: 43°22′5″N 83°34′35″W
- Area: less than one acre
- Built: 1886
- NRHP reference No.: 72000655
- Added to NRHP: March 24, 1972

The McKinley School is a former school building located at 510 Butler Street in Vassar, Michigan. It was listed on the National Register of Historic Places in 1972.

== History ==
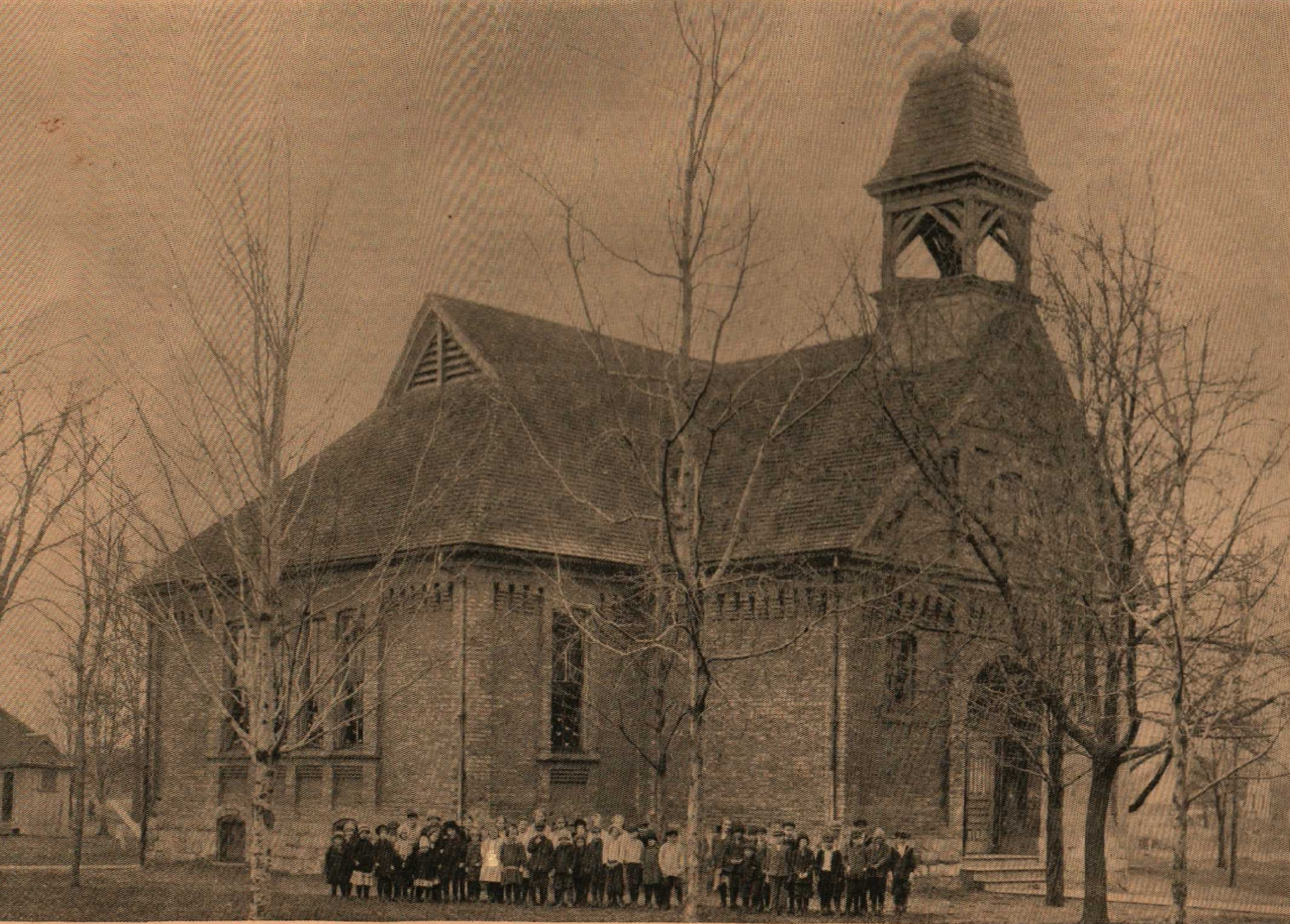
McKinley School, c. 1916

The first school in Vassar, a frame structure, was built in 1852; this was replaced in 1860 with a brick structure. As the population increased, an addition was made to that school in 1881. However, the district was still growing, and the decision was made to construct a second building to serve pupils living on the east side of the city. The McKinley School was constructed in 1886, and was originally known as the "East Primary Building." However, soon after the assassination of President William McKinley in 1901, the name was changed to the McKinley School. The building was used for classes by the school district until 1964. After that, it was used as storage by the school district until 1971, when it was sold to private owners.

The school used to be a dance school. Currently a private residence.

== Description ==
The McKinley School is a 1 1/2-story plain brick two-room schoolhouse on a stone foundation. The main entrance is through two double doors, located within an arched opening and surmounted by a fan light. The windows are in segmented arched openings. A 40 foot tall tower once held the school bell.

Inside are two rooms, both 27 feet by 33 feet. A small kitchenette is in the rear, and the building contains bathrooms and a coatroom.
