= Juniata Township, Michigan =

- Township
- Location within the state of Michigan
- Coordinates: 43°26′11″N 83°31′7″W
- Country: United States
- State: Michigan
- County: Tuscola

Area
  - Total: 35.3 sq mi (91.3 km^{2})
  - Land: 35.3 sq mi (91.3 km^{2})
  - Water: 0 sq mi (0.0 km^{2})
- Elevation: 705 ft (215 m)

Population (2020)
  - Total: 1,563
  - Density: 44.3/sq mi (17.1/km^{2})
- Time zone: UTC-5 (Eastern (EST))
  - Summer (DST): UTC-4 (EDT)
- ZIP codes: 48723 (Caro); 48733 (Fairgrove); 48768 (Vassar)
- FIPS code: 26-42140
- GNIS feature ID: 1626546
- Website: https://www.juniatatwp.org/

Juniata Township is a civil township of Tuscola County in the U.S. state of Michigan. The population was 1,563 at the 2020 census.

== Communities ==
- Karrs Corner is an unincorporated community in the Township at the junction of M-81 and S. Vassar Road 43°27′05″N 83°34′53″W).
- Watrousville is an unincorporated community in the Township at the junction of M-81 and Ringle Road at 43°27′08″N 83°31′23″W. After the first white settler, Patrick McGlone, arrived in 1851 and opened an inn, the place was known as "McGlone Corners". Aaron Watrous worked with a lumber crew on the Cass River in 1852 and built a mill here in 1853. He platted the village and became the first postmaster in December 1855. The post office closed in September 1935. Watrousville was a station on the a branch line of the Michigan Central Railroad.

== Geography ==
According to the United States Census Bureau, the township has a total area of 35.3 square miles (91 km^{2}), all land.

== Demographics ==
As of the census of 2000, there were 1,673 people, 608 households, and 468 families residing in the township. The population density was 47.4 inhabitants per square mile (18.3/km^{2}). There were 648 housing units at an average density of 18.4 per square mile (7.1/km^{2}). The racial makeup of the township was 93.84% White, 2.51% African American, 0.96% Native American, 1.08% from other races, and 1.61% from two or more races. Hispanic or Latino of any race were 2.45% of the population.

There were 608 households, out of which 37.2% had children under the age of 18 living with them, 65.1% were married couples living together, 8.1% had a female householder with no husband present, and 22.9% were non-families. 18.9% of all households were made up of individuals, and 6.7% had someone living alone who was 65 years of age or older. The average household size was 2.75 and the average family size was 3.12.

In the township the population was spread out, with 28.5% under the age of 18, 6.2% from 18 to 24, 28.9% from 25 to 44, 25.4% from 45 to 64, and 11.0% who were 65 years of age or older. The median age was 38 years. For every 100 females, there were 107.3 males. For every 100 females age 18 and over, there were 100.3 males.

The median income for a household in the township was $44,286, and the median income for a family was $50,714. Males had a median income of $36,357 versus $28,409 for females. The per capita income for the township was $18,210. About 7.0% of families and 9.9% of the population were below the poverty line, including 13.4% of those under age 18 and 4.4% of those age 65 or over.

== People ==
- Idah McGlone Gibson (1860-1933), journalist
