= Millington, Michigan =

- Village
- Location of Millington, Michigan
- Coordinates: 43°16′56″N 83°31′46″W
- Country: United States
- State: Michigan
- County: Tuscola

Area
  - Total: 1.36 sq mi (3.53 km^{2})
  - Land: 1.36 sq mi (3.53 km^{2})
  - Water: 0 sq mi (0.00 km^{2})
- Elevation: 751 ft (229 m)

Population (2020)
  - Total: 1,028
  - Density: 754.6/sq mi (291.37/km^{2})
- Time zone: UTC-5 (Eastern (EST))
  - Summer (DST): UTC-4 (EDT)
- ZIP code: 48746
- Area code: 989
- FIPS code: 26-54220
- GNIS feature ID: 0632413
- Website: www.millingtonvillage.org

Millington is a village in Tuscola County, Michigan, United States. As of the 2020 census, Millington had a population of 1,028. The village is located within Millington Township.

Millington and the surrounding area is known as a "bedroom community" of both Saginaw and Flint. Primary employment is manufacturing-related and agricultural.

== Geography ==
According to the United States Census Bureau, the village has a total area of 1.35 square miles (3.50 km^{2}), all land, and 0.35 square miles of football field.

Arbela Township, located west of Millington, is closely associated and considered part of the Millington Cardinal community.

The Murphy Lake State Game Area is located approximately four miles east-northeast of Millington.

=== Climate ===
This climatic region is typified by large seasonal temperature differences, with warm to hot (and often humid) summers and cold (sometimes severely cold) winters. According to the Köppen Climate Classification system, Millington has a humid continental climate, abbreviated "Dfb" on climate maps.

== Demographics ==
Historical population
Census	Pop.	Note	%±
1880	492		—
1890	454		−7.7%
1900	638		40.5%
1910	623		−2.4%
1920	689		10.6%
1930	678		−1.6%
1940	813		19.9%
1950	1,043		28.3%
1960	1,159		11.1%
1970	1,099		−5.2%
1980	1,237		12.6%
1990	1,114		−9.9%
2000	1,137		2.1%
2010	1,072		−5.7%
2020	1,028		−4.1%
U.S. Decennial Census

=== 2010 census ===
As of the census of 2010, there were 1,072 people, 420 households, a. The population density was 794.1 inhabitants per square mile (306.6/km^{2}). There were 464 housing units at an average density of 343.7 per square mile (132.7/km^{2}). The racial makeup of the village was 94.9% White, 1.5% African American, 0.6% Native American, 0.6% Asian, 0.9% from other races, and 1.6% from two or more races. Hispanic or Latino of any race were 2.5% of the population.

There were 420 households, of which 37.9% had children under the age of 18 living with them, 46.9% were married couples living together, 14.8% had a female householder with no husband present, 6.0% had a male householder with no wife present, and 32.4% were non-families. 27.9% of all households were made up of individuals, and 14% had someone living alone who was 65 years of age or older. The average household size was 2.55 and the average family size was 3.05.

The median age in the village was 32.8 years. 28.5% of residents were under the age of 18; 10.9% were between the ages of 18 and 24; 26.3% were from 25 to 44; 19.7% were from 45 to 64; and 14.6% were 65 years of age or older.

=== 2000 census ===
As of the census of 2000, there were 1,137 people, 446 households, and 306 families residing in the village. The population density was 1,102.7 inhabitants per square mile (425.8/km^{2}). There were 469 housing units at an average density of 454.9 per square mile (175.6/km^{2}). The racial makeup of the village was 98.86% White, 0.35% African American, 0.18% Native American, 0.09% Asian, 0.18% from other races, and 0.35% from two or more races. Hispanic or Latino of any race were 0.53% of the population.

There were 446 households, out of which 35.4% had children under the age of 18 living with them, 49.3% were married couples living together, 16.8% had a female householder with no husband present, and 31.2% were non-families. 27.4% of all households were made up of individuals, and 13.5% had someone living alone who was 65 years of age or older. The average household size was 2.51 and the average family size was 3.05.

In the village, the population was spread out, with 27.4% under the age of 18, 10.1% from 18 to 24, 28.1% from 25 to 44, 20.1% from 45 to 64, and 14.3% who were 65 years of age or older. The median age was 33 years. For every 100 females, there were 82.5 males. For every 100 females age 18 and over, there were 79.2 males.

The median income for a household in the village was $35,223, and the median income for a family was $42,353. Males had a median income of $32,381 versus $22,625 for females. The per capita income for the village was $17,195. About 6.6% of families and 10.2% of the population were below the poverty line, including 17.2% of those under age 18 and 4.3% of those age 65 or over.

== Education ==
Millington is served by a K-12 public school system, Millington Community Schools and a K-8 Lutheran (St. Paul Lutheran) parochial school.

== Notable Person ==
- Art Clokey (1921 - 2010), animated filmmaker, creator of Gumby; spent his childhoods visiting his family in Millington, later crediting the visits for inspiring the creation of Gumby.
