= Vassar, Michigan =

- City
- Nicknames: Cork Pine City, V-Town
- Location of Vassar, Michigan
- Coordinates: 43°22′19″N 83°34′53″W
- Country: United States
- State: Michigan
- County: Tuscola
- Founded: 1 March 1849

Area
  - Total: 2.20 sq mi (5.69 km^{2})
  - Land: 2.15 sq mi (5.56 km^{2})
  - Water: 0.046 sq mi (0.12 km^{2})
- Elevation: 643 ft (196 m)

Population (2020)
  - Total: 2,727
  - Density: 1,269.3/sq mi (490.07/km^{2})
- Time zone: UTC-5 (Eastern (EST))
  - Summer (DST): UTC-4 (EDT)
- ZIP codes: 48768-48769
- Area code: 989
- FIPS code: 26-81840
- GNIS feature ID: 1615523
- Website: www.cityofvassar.org

Vassar is a city in Tuscola County in the U.S. state of Michigan. Founded March 1, 1849. The population was 2,727 at the 2020 census and 2,697 in 2010 (an increase of about 1.1%). The city is located on the western edge of Vassar Township but is administratively autonomous.

== History ==
Vassar was founded by four men who were led by James M. Edmunds and Townsend North in search of an area to build a dam and start a city. The city was named after Edmunds' uncle, Matthew Vassar, who later founded Vassar College.

It was the first county seat of Tuscola County. In 1860, the seat was moved to Caro. Vassar's growth for the next thirty years was based mainly on its lumbering and a handful of related industries.

The settlement became a village in 1871. Vassar was the crossing of the Michigan Central's Bay City Branch (from Detroit) and the Port Huron & Northwestern (from 1900 Pere Marquette) line running between Saginaw and Port Huron via Marlette.

The voters of the Village of Vassar elected to become a city on September 28, 1944. On February 19, 1945, the voters approved the charter for the City of Vassar.

== Geography ==
- According to the United States Census Bureau, the city has a total area of 2.18 square miles (5.65 km^{2}), of which 2.12 square miles (5.49 km^{2}) is land and 0.06 square miles (0.16 km^{2}) is water. The Cass River flows through the city.
- It is considered to be part of the Thumb of Michigan, which in turn is a subregion of the Flint/Tri-Cities.

== Demographics ==
Historical population
| Census | Pop. | Note | %± |
|---|---|---|---|
| 1880 | 670 | | — |
| 1890 | 1,682 | | 151.0% |
| 1900 | 1,832 | | 8.9% |
| 1910 | 1,659 | | −9.4% |
| 1920 | 1,453 | | −12.4% |
| 1930 | 1,816 | | 25.0% |
| 1940 | 2,154 | | 18.6% |
| 1950 | 2,530 | | 17.5% |
| 1960 | 2,680 | | 5.9% |
| 1970 | 2,802 | | 4.6% |
| 1980 | 2,727 | | −2.7% |
| 1990 | 2,559 | | −6.2% |
| 2000 | 2,823 | | 10.3% |
| 2010 | 2,697 | | −4.5% |
| 2020 | 2,727 | | 1.1% |
U.S. Decennial Census

=== 2020 census ===
As of the 2020 census, Vassar had a population of 2,727. The median age was 35.2 years. 28.0% of residents were under the age of 18 and 16.5% of residents were 65 years of age or older. For every 100 females there were 99.9 males, and for every 100 females age 18 and over there were 93.8 males age 18 and over.

0.0% of residents lived in urban areas, while 100.0% lived in rural areas.

There were 1,076 households in Vassar, of which 29.5% had children under the age of 18 living in them. Of all households, 38.6% were married-couple households, 20.7% were households with a male householder and no spouse or partner present, and 32.3% were households with a female householder and no spouse or partner present. About 35.1% of all households were made up of individuals and 14.2% had someone living alone who was 65 years of age or older.

There were 1,166 housing units, of which 7.7% were vacant. The homeowner vacancy rate was 1.7% and the rental vacancy rate was 4.8%.

Racial composition as of the 2020 census
| Race | Number | Percent |
|---|---|---|
| White | 2,311 | 84.7% |
| Black or African American | 166 | 6.1% |
| American Indian and Alaska Native | 17 | 0.6% |
| Asian | 7 | 0.3% |
| Native Hawaiian and Other Pacific Islander | 0 | 0.0% |
| Some other race | 69 | 2.5% |
| Two or more races | 157 | 5.8% |
| Hispanic or Latino (of any race) | 170 | 6.2% |

=== 2010 census ===
As of the census of 2010, there were 2,697 people, 1,001 households, and 668 families living in the city. The population density was 1,272.2 inhabitants per square mile (491.2/km^{2}). There were 1,154 housing units at an average density of 544.3 per square mile (210.2/km^{2}). The racial makeup of the city was 87.4% White, 8.8% African American, 0.4% Native American, 0.1% Asian, 1.1% from other races, and 2.2% from two or more races. Hispanic or Latino of any race were 3.0% of the population.

There were 1,001 households, of which 35.3% had children under the age of 18 living with them, 45.4% were married couples living together, 16.2% had a female householder with no husband present, 5.2% had a male householder with no wife present, and 33.3% were non-families. 28.2% of all households were made up of individuals, and 11.2% had someone living alone who was 65 years of age or older. The average household size was 2.47 and the average family size was 2.99.

The median age in the city was 32.5 years. 31.6% of residents were under the age of 18; 9% were between the ages of 18 and 24; 23% were from 25 to 44; 24.5% were from 45 to 64; and 11.8% were 65 years of age or older. The gender makeup of the city was 49.8% male and 50.2% female.

=== 2000 census ===
As of the census of 2000, there were 2,823 people, 991 households, and 676 families living in the city. The population density was 1,266.2 inhabitants per square mile (488.9/km^{2}). There were 1,062 housing units at an average density of 476.3 per square mile (183.9/km^{2}). The racial makeup of the city was 88.42% White, 8.25% African American, 0.21% Native American, 0.21% Asian, 1.35% from other races, and 1.56% from two or more races. Hispanic or Latino of any race were 2.94% of the population.

There were 991 households, out of which 34.0% had children under the age of 18 living with them, 51.2% were married couples living together, 12.9% had a female householder with no husband present, and 31.7% were non-families. 28.8% of all households were made up of individuals, and 12.6% had someone living alone who was 65 years of age or older. The average household size was 2.55 and the average family size was 3.14.

In the city, the population was spread out, with 34.2% under the age of 18, 8.9% from 18 to 24, 26.4% from 25 to 44, 18.6% from 45 to 64, and 11.9% who were 65 years of age or older. The median age was 30 years. For every 100 females, there were 106.5 males. For every 100 females age 18 and over, there were 83.9 males.

The median income for a household in the city was $38,087, and the median income for a family was $44,924. Males had a median income of $32,045 versus $22,305 for females. The per capita income for the city was $15,029. About 6.3% of families and 9.2% of the population were below the poverty line, including 11.8% of those under age 18 and 7.0% of those age 65 or over.

== Education ==
Vassar Public Schools:

- Vassar High School
- Vassar Junior High School
- Central Elementary School
- Townsend North Elementary School

St. Luke's Lutheran School is a grade school of the Wisconsin Evangelical Lutheran Synod in Vassar.
